= 2016 King George VI and Queen Elizabeth Stakes =

66th King George VI and Queen Elizabeth Stakes
- King George VI and Queen Elizabeth Stakes
- Location: Ascot Racecourse
- Date: 23 July 2016
- Winning horse: Highland Reel (GB)
- Jockey: Ryan Moore
- Trainer: Aidan O'Brien (IRE)
- Owner: Derrick Smith & Mrs John Magnier & Michael Tabor

The 2016 King George VI and Queen Elizabeth Stakes was a horse race held at Ascot Racecourse on Saturday 23 July 2016. It was the 66th running of the King George VI and Queen Elizabeth Stakes.

The winner was Highland Reel, a four-year-old bay colt trained at Ballydoyle by Aidan O'Brien and ridden by Ryan Moore. The winner was owned by the Coolmore Stud and raced in the colours of Derrick Smith, Susan Magnier and Michael Tabor. Highland Reel's victory was the fourth in the race for his trainer and owners following Galileo (2001), Dylan Thomas (2007) and Duke of Marmalade (2008). Magnier and Tabor also owned a part-share of the 2000 winner, Montjeu. Ryan Moore had previously won the race on Conduit in 2009.

== The contenders ==
The race attracted a field of seven runners, four from England, two from Ireland and one from France. In the build-up to the race it seemed certain that the 2015 winner Postponed would start a strong favourite but the horse was withdrawn three days before the contest when he was found to be suffering from a respiratory infection. At the supplementary entry stage two days earlier, Queen Elizabeth II had entered her four-year-old Dartmouth at a cost of £75,000 but the owners of the Eclipse Stakes winner Hawkbill opted to bypass the race. Dartmouth was regarded as a strong contender, having won the John Porter Stakes, Ormonde Stakes and Hardwicke Stakes. The Irish Coolmore Stud organisation was represented by two runners from the Aidan O'Brien stable: Highland Reel was a proven international campaigner, having won the Secretariat Stakes and the Hong Kong Vase, whilst Sir Isaac Newton had won the International Stakes at the Curragh on his last start. France's representative Erupt had won the Grand Prix de Paris in 2015 and finished second in the Grand Prix de Saint-Cloud on his most recent appearance. The only three-year-old in the race was Wings of Desire who had won the Dante Stakes before finishing fourth in the 2016 Epsom Derby. The other two runners were Western Hymn (Sandown Classic Trial, Prix Eugène Adam, Gordon Richards Stakes, Brigadier Gerard Stakes) and the gelding Second Step (Jockey Club Stakes, Grosser Preis von Berlin).

Highland Reel was made the 13/8 favourite ahead of Erupt at 3/1, Wings of Desire on 4/1 and Dartmouth 9/2. The outsiders Sir Isaac Newton, Western Hymn and Second Step started at 14/1, 25/1 and 33/1 respectively.

== The race ==
Moore sent Highland Reel into the lead from the start and the favourite set a steady early pace from Erupt, Wings of Desire and Sir Isaac Newton with Dartmouth being restrained towards the rear of the field. Highland Reel went several lengths clear of the field at half way but the margin was reduced as he entered the straight ahead of Wings of Desire as Erupt stayed on and Dartmouth began to make progress on the outside. Highland Reel repelled the challenge of Wings of Desire and won by one and a quarter lengths with Dartmouth two and three quarter lengths back in third place. Sir Isaac Newton held off Erupt for fourth ahead of Western Hymn and Second Step.

== Race details ==
- Sponsor: QIPCO
- Purse: £1,150,000; First prize: £689,027
- Surface: Turf
- Going: Good to Firm
- Distance: 12 furlongs
- Number of runners: 7
- Winner's time: 2:28.97

== Full result ==
| Pos. | Marg. | Horse (bred) | Age | Jockey | Trainer (Country) | Odds |
|---|---|---|---|---|---|---|
| 1 | | Highland Reel (IRE) | 4 | Ryan Moore | Aidan O'Brien (IRE) | 13/8 fav |
| 2 | 1¼ | Wings of Desire (GB) | 3 | Frankie Dettori | John Gosden (GB) | 4/1 |
| 3 | 2¾ | Dartmouth (GB) | 4 | Olivier Peslier | Michael Stoute (GB) | 9/2 |
| 4 | ½ | Sir Isaac Newton (GB) | 4 | Seamie Heffernan | Aidan O'Brien (IRE) | 14/1 |
| 5 | nk | Erupt (IRE) | 4 | Stéphane Pasquier | Francis-Henri Graffard (FR) | 3/1 |
| 6 | 1¼ | Western Hymn (GB) | 5 | Robert Havlin | John Gosden (GB) | 25/1 |
| 7 | nk | Second Step (IRE) | 5 | Jamie Spencer | Luca Cumani (GB) | 33/1 |

- Abbreviations: nse = nose; nk = neck; shd = head; hd = head

== Winner's details ==
Further details of the winner, Highland Reel

- Sex: Colt
- Foaled: 21 February 2012
- Country: Ireland
- Sire: Galileo
- Owner: Derrick Smith & Mrs John Magnier & Michael Tabor
- Breeder: Hveger Syndicate
