= 2016 World's Best Racehorse Rankings =

The 2016 World's Best Racehorse Rankings, sponsored by Longines was the 2016 edition of the World's Best Racehorse Rankings. It was an assessment of Thoroughbred racehorses issued by the International Federation of Horseracing Authorities (IFHA) on 24 January 2017. It included horses aged three or older which competed in flat races during 2016. It was open to all horses irrespective of where they raced or were trained.

== Rankings for 2016 ==
- For a detailed guide to this table, see below.

| Rank | Rating | Horse | Age | Sex | Trained | Pos. | Race | Surface | Dist. | Cat. |
|---|---|---|---|---|---|---|---|---|---|---|
| 1 | 134 | Arrogate (USA) | 3 | C | USA | 1st | Breeders' Cup Classic | Dirt | 2,000 | I |
| 2 | 133 | California Chrome (USA) | 5 | H | USA | 1st | Awesome Again Stakes; Pacific Classic | Dirt | 1,800; 2,000 | M I |
| 3 | 132 | Winx (AUS) | 5 | M | AUS | 1st | Doncaster Handicap; Cox Plate | Turf | 1,600; 2050 | M I |
| 4 | 129 | Almanzor (FR) | 3 | C | FR | 1st | Irish Champion Stakes | Turf | 2,000 | I |
| 5 | 127 | A Shin Hikari (JPN) | 5 | H | JPN | 1st | Prix d'Ispahan | Turf | 1,800 | M |
| 5 | 127 | Maurice (JPN) | 5 | H | JPN | 1st | Hong Kong Cup | Turf | 2,000 | I |
| 7 | 126 | Frosted (USA) | 4 | C | USA | 1st | Metropolitan Mile | Dirt | 1,600 | M |
| 8 | 124 | Found (IRE) | 4 | F | IRE | 2nd 1st | Irish Champion Stakes; Prix de l'Arc de Triomphe | Turf | 2,000; 2,400 | I L |
| 8 | 124 | Hartnell (GB) | 5 | G | AUS | 1st | Turnbull Stakes | Turf | 2,000 | I |
| 8 | 124 | Postponed (IRE) | 5 | H | GB | 1st | Dubai Sheema Classic; International Stakes | Turf | 2,410; 2,100 | L I |
| 8 | 124 | Werther (NZ) | 5 | G | HK | 1st | Queen Elizabeth II Cup | Turf | 2,000 | I |
| 12 | 123 | Fascinating Rock (IRE) | 5 | H | IRE | 1st | Tattersalls Gold Cup | Turf | 2,000 | I |
| 12 | 123 | Flintshire (GB) | 6 | H | USA | 1st | Sword Dancer Handicap | Turf | 2,400 | L |
| 12 | 123 | Highland Reel (IRE) | 4 | C | IRE | 1st | Breeders' Cup Turf | Turf | 2,400 | L |
| 12 | 123 | Kitasan Black (JPN) | 4 | C | JPN | 1st | Japan Cup | Turf | 2,400 | L |
| 12 | 123 | Nyquist (USA) | 3 | C | USA | 1st | Kentucky Derby | Dirt | 2,000 | I |
| 12 | 123 | Satono Crown (JPN) | 4 | C | JPN | 1st | Hong Kong Vase | Turf | 2,400 | L |
| 18 | 122 | Beholder (USA) | 6 | M | USA | 1st | Breeders' Cup Distaff | Dirt | 1,800 | M |
| 18 | 122 | Chautauqua (AUS) | 6 | G | AUS | 3rd | Newmarket Handicap | Turf | 1,200 | S |
| 18 | 122 | Dortmund (USA) | 4 | C | USA | 2nd | San Diego Handicap | Dirt | 1,600 | M |
| 18 | 122 | Limato (IRE) | 4 | G | GB | 1st | July Cup; Prix de la Forêt | Turf | 1,200; 1,400 | S M |
| 18 | 122 | Minding (IRE) | 3 | F | IRE | 1st | Queen Elizabeth II Stakes | Turf | 1,600 | M |
| 18 | 122 | Ribchester (IRE) | 3 | C | GB | 2nd | Queen Elizabeth II Stakes | Turf | 1,600 | M |
| 18 | 122 | Satono Diamond (JPN) | 3 | C | JPN | 1st | Arima Kinen; Kikuka Sho | Turf | 2,500; 3,000 | L E |
| 18 | 122 | Songbird (USA) | 3 | F | USA | 1st | Alabama Stakes; Cotillion Stakes | Turf | 2,000; 1,700 | I M |
| 18 | 122 | Tepin (USA) | 5 | M | USA | 1st | Jenny Wiley Stakes | Turf | 1,700 | M |
| 18 | 122 | The Gurkha (IRE) | 3 | C | IRE | 1st | Sussex Stakes | Turf | 1,600 | M |
| 18 | 122 | Tourist (USA) | 5 | H | USA | 1st | Breeders' Cup Mile | Dirt | 1,600 | M |
| 29 | 121 | Duramente (JPN) | 4 | C | JPN | 1st | Nakayama Kinen | Turf | 1,800 | M |
| 29 | 121 | Galileo Gold (GB) | 3 | C | GB | 1st | St James's Palace Stakes | Turf | 1,600 | M |
| 29 | 121 | Harzand (IRE) | 3 | C | IRE | 1st | Epsom Derby | Turf | 2,400 | L |
| 29 | 121 | Makahiki (JPN) | 3 | C | JPN | 1st | Tokyo Yushun | Turf | 2,400 | L |
| 29 | 121 | Mecca's Angel (IRE) | 5 | M | GB | 1st | Nunthorpe Stakes | Turf | 1,000 | S |
| 34 | 120 | Aerovelocity (NZ) | 7 | G | HK | 1st | Hong Kong Sprint | Turf | 1,200 | S |
| 34 | 120 | Dee Majesty (JPN) | 3 | C | JPN | 1st | Satsuki Sho | Turf | 2,000 | I |
| 34 | 120 | Exaggerator (USA) | 3 | C | USA | 1st | Preakness Stakes | Dirt | 1,900 | I |
| 34 | 120 | Flying Artie (AUS) | 3 | C | AUS | 1st | Coolmore Stud Stakes | Turf | 1,200 | S |
| 34 | 120 | Gold Actor (JPN) | 5 | H | JPN | 3rd | Arima Kinen | Turf | 2,500 | L |
| 34 | 120 | Jack Hobbs (GB) | 4 | C | GB | 3rd | Champion Stakes | Turf | 2,000 | I |
| 34 | 120 | Jet Setting (IRE) | 3 | F | IRE | 1st | Irish 1,000 Guineas | Turf | 1,600 | M |
| 34 | 120 | Journey (GB) | 4 | F | GB | 1st | British Champions Fillies' and Mares' Stakes | Turf | 2,400 | L |
| 34 | 120 | Lightning Spear (GB) | 5 | H | GB | 3rd | Queen Elizabeth II Stakes | Turf | 1,600 | M |
| 34 | 120 | Mutakayyef (GB) | 5 | G | GB | 3rd | International Stakes | Turf | 2,100 | I |
| 34 | 120 | My Dream Boat (IRE) | 4 | C | GB | 1st | Prince of Wales's Stakes | Turf | 2,000 | I |
| 34 | 120 | Order of St George (IRE) | 4 | C | IRE | 1st 3rd | Ascot Gold Cup; Prix de l'Arc de Triomphe | Turf | 4,000; 2,400 | E L |
| 34 | 120 | Protectionist (IRE) | 6 | H | IRE | 1st | Grosser Preis von Berlin | Turf | 2,400 | L |
| 34 | 120 | Real Steel (JPN) | 4 | C | JPN | 1st 2nd | Dubai Turf; Tenno Sho | Turf | 1,800; 2,000 | M I |
| 34 | 120 | Tamarkuz (USA) | 6 | H | USA | 1st | Breeders' Cup Dirt Mile | Dirt | 1,600 | M |
| 34 | 120 | Vadamos (FR) | 5 | H | FR | 1st | Prix du Moulin | Turf | 1,600 | M |
| 50 | 119 | Beauty Only (IRE) | 5 | G | HK | 1st | Hong Kong Mile | Turf | 1,600 | M |
| 50 | 119 | Belardo (IRE) | 4 | C | GB | 1st | Lockinge Stakes | Turf | 1,600 | M |
| 50 | 119 | Contentment (AUS) | 6 | G | HK | 1st | Queen's Silver Jubilee Cup | Turf | 1,400 | M |
| 50 | 119 | Dariyan (FR) | 4 | C | FR | 1st | Prix Ganay | Turf | 2,100 | I |
| 50 | 119 | Designs On Rome (IRE) | 6 | G | HK | 1st | Hong Kong Gold Cup; Sha Tin Trophy | Turf | 2,000; 1,600 | I M |
| 50 | 119 | Effinex (USA) | 5 | H | USA | 1st | Oaklawn Handicap; Suburban Handicap | Dirt | 1,800; 2,000 | M I |
| 50 | 119 | Elbchaussee (PER) | 7 | H | PER | 1st | Clasico APCC del Peru | Dirt | 2,200 | L |
| 50 | 119 | Extreme Choice (AUS) | 3 | C | AUS | 1st | A J Moir Stakes | Turf | 1,000 | S |
| 50 | 119 | Forever Unbridled (USA) | 4 | F | USA | 3rd | Breeders' Cup Distaff | Dirt | 1,800 | M |
| 50 | 119 | Hawkbill (USA) | 3 | C | GB | 1st | Eclipse Stakes | Turf | 2,000 | I |
| 50 | 119 | Idaho (IRE) | 3 | C | IRE | 2nd | Irish Derby | Turf | 2,400 | L |
| 50 | 119 | Jameka (AUS) | 4 | F | AUS | 1st | Caulfield Cup | Turf | 2,400 | L |
| 50 | 119 | Legal Eagle (SAF) | 5 | G | SAF | 1st | Horse Chestnut Stakes; Premier's Champions Challenge | Turf | 1,600; 2,000 | M I |
| 50 | 119 | Logotype (JPN) | 6 | H | JPN | 1st | Yasuda Kinen | Turf | 1,600 | M |
| 50 | 119 | Lucky Bubbles (AUS) | 5 | G | HK | 1st | Premier Bowl | Turf | 1,200 | S |
| 50 | 119 | Melatonin (USA) | 5 | G | USA | 1st | Gold Cup at Santa Anita Stakes | Dirt | 2,000 | I |
| 50 | 119 | Peniaphobia (IRE) | 5 | G | HK | 1st | Sha Tin Vase | Turf | 1,200 | S |
| 50 | 119 | Secret Weapon (GB) | 6 | G | HK | 2nd | Hong Kong Cup | Turf | 2,000 | I |
| 50 | 119 | Seventh Heaven (IRE) | 3 | F | IRE | 1st | Yorkshire Oaks | Turf | 2,400 | L |
| 50 | 119 | Smart Call (SAF) | 5 | M | SAF | 1st | J & B Met | Turf | 2,000 | I |
| 50 | 119 | Stellar Wind (USA) | 4 | F | USA | 1st | Clement L. Hirsch Stakes | Dirt | 1,700 | M |
| 50 | 119 | Time Test (GB) | 4 | C | GB | 1st | Brigadier Gerard Stakes | Turf | 2,000 | I |
| 50 | 119 | US Army Ranger (IRE) | 3 | C | IRE | 2nd | Epsom Derby | Turf | 2,400 | L |
| 50 | 119 | Zelzal (FR) | 3 | C | FR | 1st | Prix Jean Prat | Turf | 1,600 | M |
| 74 | 118 | Alice Springs (IRE) | 3 | F | Ire | 1st | Matron Stakes | Turf | 1,600 | M |
| 74 | 118 | A P Indian (USA) | 6 | G | USA | 1st | Forego Stakes | Dirt | 1,400 | M |

== Guide ==
A complete guide to the main table above.

Rank
A horse's position in the list, with the most highly rated at number 1. Each horse is ranked once according to its highest rating. Any lesser ratings for the same horse are not ranked.

Rating
A rating represents a weight value in pounds, with higher values given to horses which showed greater ability. It is judged that these weights would equalise the abilities of the horses if carried in a theoretical handicap race. The minimum rating required for inclusion is 115.

Horse
Each horse's name is followed by a suffix (from the IFHA's International Code of Suffixes) which indicates the country foaled.

Age
The age of the horse at the time it achieved its rating. The racing ages of all horses foaled in a particular part of the world increase simultaneously, regardless of the actual date of foaling.
Dates of age increase by location foaled
| Northern Hemisphere | 1 January |
| South America | 1 July |
| Australia, New Zealand and South Africa | 1 August |

Sex
| C | Colt | Ungelded male horse up to four-years-old |
| F | Filly | Female horse up to four-years-old |
| H | Horse | Ungelded male horse over four-years-old |
| M | Mare | Female horse over four-years-old |
| G | Gelding | Gelded male horse of any age |

Trained
The country where the horse was trained at the time of the rating, abbreviated using the International Code of Suffixes.

Position
The horse's finishing position in the race shown. The actual finishing order can sometimes be amended following an inquiry or a disqualification.
| = | Dead-heat |
| ↑ | Promoted from original finishing position |
| ↓ | Relegated from original finishing position |

Race
The race (or one of the races) for which the horse achieved its rating. A defeated horse can be rated above its higher-placed opponents if it carried more weight.

Surface
The surface of the track on which the race was run, eg. turf or dirt. Synthetic surfaces are described as "artificial".

Distance
The distance of the race in metres. In some countries (eg. Canada, Great Britain, Ireland and the United States), the length of a race is usually expressed in miles and furlongs. These units have been converted to metres to allow for universal comparison.
Common conversions
| 5 furlongs | = 1,006 m | 1 mile and 1½ furlongs | = 1,911 m |
| 6 furlongs | = 1,207 m | 1 mile and 2 furlongs | = 2,012 m |
| 6½ furlongs | = 1,308 m | 1 mile and 2½ furlongs | = 2,112 m |
| 7 furlongs | = 1,408 m | 1 mile and 3 furlongs | = 2,213 m |
| 7½ furlongs | = 1,509 m | 1 mile and 4 furlongs | = 2,414 m |
| 1 mile | = 1,609 m | 1 mile and 6 furlongs | = 2,816 m |
| 1 mile and ½ furlong | = 1,710 m | 2 miles | = 3,219 m |
| 1 mile and 1 furlong | = 1,811 m | 2 miles and 4 furlongs | = 4,023 m |

Category
| | | Metres | Furlongs |
| S | Sprint | 1,000–1,300; 1,000–1,599 (CAN / USA) | 5–6.5; 5–7.99 (CAN / USA) |
| M | Mile | 1,301–1,899; 1,600–1,899 (CAN / USA) | 6.51–9.49; 8–9.49 (CAN / USA) |
| I | Intermediate | 1,900–2,100 | 9.5–10.5 |
| L | Long | 2,101–2,700 | 10.51–13.5 |
| E | Extended | 2,701+ | 13.51+ |

International Code of Suffixes
The following countries have been represented in the WTR as foaling or training locations since the first edition in 2004.
| ARG | Argentina | ITY | Italy |
| AUS | Australia | JPN | Japan |
| BRZ | Brazil | KSA | Saudi Arabia |
| CAN | Canada | NZ | New Zealand |
| CHI | Chile | SAF | South Africa |
| CZE | Czech Republic | SIN | Singapore |
| FR | France | SPA | Spain |
| GB | Great Britain | TUR | Turkey |
| GER | Germany | UAE | United Arab Emirates |
| HK | Hong Kong | USA | United States |
| HUN | Hungary | VEN | Venezuela |
| IRE | Ireland | ZIM | Zimbabwe |

Shading
The shaded areas represent lesser ratings recorded by horses which were more highly rated in a different category. The IFHA publishes this information when the lower rating is the overall top performance in a particular category.
