= 2017 King George VI and Queen Elizabeth Stakes =

- Location: Ascot Racecourse
- Date: July 29, 2017
- Winning horse: Enable

The 2017 King George VI and Queen Elizabeth Stakes was a horse race held at Ascot Racecourse on Saturday 29 July 2017. It was the 67th running of the King George VI and Queen Elizabeth Stakes.

The winner was Enable, a three-year-old bay filly trained at Newmarket by John Gosden, ridden by Frankie Dettori and owned by Khalid Abullah. Enable's victory was the fifth in the race for Dettori and the third for Gosden. Khalid Abullah won the race for the second time, 31 years after Dancing Brave's success in 1986. Enable was the fourth three-year-old filly to win the race following Dahlia, Pawneese and Taghrooda.

== The contenders ==
The race attracted a field of ten runners, seven from England, two from Ireland and one from Argentina. There were no challengers from continental Europe.

In the build-up to the race it seemed likely that the 2016 winner Highland Reel, trained in Ireland by Aidan O'Brien, would start favourite but the complexion of the race changed when John Gosden announced that the leading three-year-old filly Enable, the winner of the Epsom Oaks and Irish Oaks would contest the race. The other Irish contender was Highland Reel's stablemate Idaho who had won the Hardwicke Stakes at Royal Ascot in June. The other international challenger was Sixties Song, winner of the Gran Premio Carlos Pellegrini and Gran Premio Latinoamericano in South America. John Gosden also entered Jack Hobbs the winner of the Irish Derby and the Sheema Classic as well as the Huxley Stakes winner Maverick Wave, who appeared to be the designated pacemaker. The other four runners were Ulysses (winner of the Eclipse Stakes), Benbatl (Hampton Court Stakes), My Dream Boat (Princess of Wales's Stakes) and Desert Encounter (Buckhounds Stakes).

Enable was made the 5/4 favourite ahead of Highland Reel at 9/2, Jack Hobbs on 11/2, Idaho on 8/1 and Ulysses on 9/1.

== The race ==
Maverick Wave went to the front as expected and set a strong pace on the inside whilst most of the field raced further out from the rail. Enable, Jack Hobbs and Highland Reel tracked the leader with Idaho and Benbatl close behind. Shortly after entering the straight, Enable went to the front and accelerated several lengths clear of her rivals. Jack Hobbs dropped away but Idaho stayed on well and Ulysses made progress on the outside to emerge as the filly's closest pursuer. Enable never looked in any danger of defeat and came home four and a half lengths clear of Ulysses with Idaho in third place. Highland Reel took fourth ahead of Benbatl, Desert Encounter, and My Dream Boat. Jack Hobbs and Sixties Song finished tailed-off in ninth and tenth.

== Race details ==
- Sponsor: QIPCO
- Purse: £1,150,000; First prize: £652,165
- Surface: Turf
- Going: Good to Soft
- Distance: 12 furlongs
- Number of runners: 10
- Winner's time: 2:36.22

== Full result ==
Pos.	Marg.	Horse (bred)	Age	Jockey	Trainer (Country)	Odds
1		Enable (GB)	3	Frankie Dettori	John Gosden (GB)	5/4 fav
2	4½	Ulysses (IRE)	4	Jim Crowley	Michael Stoute (GB)	9/1
3	¾	Idaho (IRE)	4	Seamie Heffernan	Aidan O'Brien (IRE)	8/1
4	4	Highland Reel (IRE)	5	Ryan Moore	Aidan O'Brien (IRE)	9/2
5	2¼	Benbatl (GB)	3	Oisin Murphy	Saeed bin Suroor (UAE)	14/1
6	6	Desert Encounter (IRE)	5	Sean Levey	David Simcock (GB)	33/1
7	shd	My Dream Boat (IRE)	5	Adam Kirby	Clive Cox (GB)	16/1
8	2	Maverick Wave (IRE)	6	Graham Lee	John Gosden (GB)	100/1
9	11	Jack Hobbs (GB)	5	William Buick	John Gosden (GB)	11/2
10	4½	Sixties Song (ARG)	4	Gerald Mosse	Alfredo F. Gaitán Dassié (ARG)	33/1

- Abbreviations: nse = nose; nk = neck; shd = head; hd = head

== Winner's details ==
Further details of the winner, Enable

- Sex: Filly
- Foaled: 12 February 2014
- Country: United Kingdom
- Sire: Nathaniel
- Owner: Khalid Abullah
- Breeder: Juddmonte Farms
