= Idaho (horse) =

Irish-bred Thoroughbred racehorse

- Racing silks of Michael Tabor
- Sire: Galileo
- Grandsire: Sadler's Wells
- Dam: Hveger
- Damsire: Danehill
- Sex: Stallion
- Foaled: 14 March 2013
- Country: Ireland
- Colour: Bay
- Breeder: Hveger Syndicate
- Owner: Susan Magnier, Michael Tabor & Derrick Smith
- Trainer: Aidan O'Brien
- Record: 23: 4-2-5
- Earnings: £1,196,473

Major wins
- Great Voltigeur Stakes (2016); Hardwicke Stakes (2017); Ormonde Stakes (2018)

Idaho (foaled 14 March 2013) is an Irish Thoroughbred racehorse. In four years on the track he raced in seven countries, namely Ireland, France, England, Canada, the United States, Japan and the United Arab Emirates. In 2016 he finished third in The Derby and second in the Irish Derby before winning the Great Voltigeur Stakes. He was the odds-on favourite for the St Leger Stakes but stumbled and unseated his rider. In the following year he ran poorly in the Coronation Cup but then won the Hardwicke Stakes at Royal Ascot and finished third in the King George VI and Queen Elizabeth Stakes. The highlight of his final season was a win in the Ormonde Stakes.

== Background ==
Idaho is a bay horse with a white blaze and two white socks bred in Ireland by the Hveger Syndicate. He was sired by Galileo, who won the Derby, Irish Derby and King George VI and Queen Elizabeth Stakes in 2001. Galileo is now one of the world's leading stallions and has been champion sire of Great Britain and Ireland five times. His other progeny include Cape Blanco, Frankel, Golden Lilac, Nathaniel, New Approach, Rip Van Winkle and Ruler of the World. Highland Reel's dam Hveger was an Australian mare who finished third in the Australasian Oaks in 2005. As a daughter of the AJC Oaks winner Circles of Gold she was a full-sister to Elvstroem and a close relative of Starspangledbanner. Hveger had previously produced Idaho's full brother Highland Reel.

As a yearling in October 2014 Idaho was offered for sale at Tattersalls and was bought for 750,000 guineas by Michael Magnier on behalf of his father, John Magnier's Coolmore Stud. Idaho entered training with Aidan O'Brien at Ballydoyle. Like many Coolmore horses, the exact details of Idaho's ownership have changed from race to race: he has raced in the colours of Michael Tabor, Susan Magnier and the partnership of Tabor, Magnier and Derrick Smith.

== Racing career ==
=== 2015: two-year-old season ===
Idaho made his racecourse debut in a maiden race over one mile on good-to-firm ground at the Curragh Racecourse on 13 October in which he was ridden by Joseph O'Brien and started at odds of 4/1 in an eleven-runner field. The colt took the lead approaching the final furlong and drew away to win "easily" by three and a half lengths. The colt was then moved up sharply in class for the Group One Critérium de Saint-Cloud over 2000 metres on 1 November. Ridden by Ryan Moore he started the 6/4 favourite but finished fourth of the ten runners, almost six lengths behind the winner Robin of Navan.

=== 2016: three-year-old season ===
Idaho began his second season in the Ballysax Stakes over ten furlongs on heavy ground at Leopardstown Racecourse on 10 April in which he was ridden by Colm O'Donoghue. After becoming upset is the starting stalls he was towards the rear of the field in the early stages before moving up to take the lead in the last quarter mile. He was overtaken 100 yards from the finish and was beaten one and a quarter lengths into second by the Dermot Weld-trained Harzand. On 10 May Idaho was ridden by Seamie Heffernan when he started 15/8 favourite Derrinstown Stud Derby Trial over the same course and distance. He stayed on in the straight but never looked likely to win, finishing third behind Moonlight Magic and Shogun.

On 4 June, Idaho was one of sixteen colts to contest the 237th running of The Derby and started at odds of 14/1. Ridden by Heffernan, he took the lead in the straight but was overtaken approaching the final furlong and finished third behind Harzand and US Army Ranger. Three weeks later Idaho faced Harzand again in the Irish Derby at the Curragh and started the 11/4 second favourite. Ridden by Moore he moved into second place behind Harzand in the straight but after a sustained struggle he was beaten half a length into second place. On 18 August at York Racecourse Idaho started odds-on favourite for the Group Two Great Voltigeur Stakes with his main rival appearing to be the King Edward VII Stakes winner Across The Stars. Ridden by Heffernan, he was restrained at the rear of the six runner field before making a forward move in the straight. He took the lead a furlong out and won by one and three quarter lengths from his stablemate Housesofparliament. After the race Heffernan said "He's improving from run to run and won well today. The way Aidan trains them, they keep improving and there is a high chance he will improve again for a step up in trip".

On 10 September Idaho, partnered by Heffernan started the odds-on favourite for the St Leger Stakes over fourteen and a half furlongs at Doncaster Racecourse. After racing towards the rear of the field he began to make began to make progress approaching the straight but then stumbled badly and unseated Heffernan three furlongs from the finish. On his final appearance of the year he stated 7/5 favourite for the Canadian International Stakes at Woodbine Racetrack on 16 October but failed to recover from a poor start and came home fifth behind the French four-year-old Erupt.

In the 2016 edition of the World's Best Racehorse Rankings Idaho was given a rating of 119, making him the 50th best racehorse in the world.

=== 2017: four-year-old season ===
On his first run of 2017 Idaho finished sixth to his older brother and stablemate Highland Reel in the Coronation Cup at Epsom on 2 June. Three weeks later he was partnered by Heffernan when he went off the 9/2 second favourite for the Group 2 Hardwicke Stakes at Royal Ascot. The Queen's horse Dartmouth headed the betting while the other fancied runners included Wings of Desire, Dal Harraild, Prize Money (Dubai City of Gold) and Western Hymn (Ormonde Stakes). Idaho tracked the leading group before taking the lead inside the final furlong and held off the late challenge of Barsanti to win by half a length. O'Brien commented "Epsom was his first run of the year and he arrived at the track only an hour before the race [after travel problems] and he was very upset and he never got time to cool down... we are delighted; he is by Galileo and they never know when to stop improving and trying. Seamie gave him a peach of a ride. We were very happy coming into the race; Ben who rides him at home was over the moon with him, he felt he'd really come forward." In the King George VI and Queen Elizabeth Stakes over the same course and distance on 29 July Idaho stayed on well to finish third to Enable and Ulysses.

In the second half of 2017 Idaho embarked on an International campaign and ran well in several races without winning again. He finished sixth in the Sword Dancer Stakes at Saratoga Race Course in August, eighth to Enable in the Prix de l'Arc de Triomphe at Chantilly Racecourse on 1 October, fourth to Bullards Alley in the Canadian International Stakes at two weeks later and fifth to Cheval Grand in the Japan Cup at Tokyo Racecourse on 26 November.

In the 2017 World's Best Racehorse Rankings Poet's Word was given a rating of 119, making him the 59th best racehorse in the world.

=== 2018: five-year-old season ===
Idaho's fourth season began at Meydan Racecourse in Dubai on 31 March when he came home eighth of the ten runners behind Hawkbill in the Sheema Classic. On his return to Europe the horse was partnered by Moore when he started 8/11 favourite when he was dropped in class for the Group 3 Ormonde Stakes over thirteen and a half furlongs at Chester Racecourse on 10 May with the best of his five opponents appearing to be Duretto (St Simon Stakes) and Danehill Kodiac (Cumberland Lodge Stakes). Idaho took the lead approaching the final furlong and drew away in the closing stages to win by three and a half lengths. O'Brien commented "Everybody was very happy with him coming here and it was nice to see him do that... Ryan has said he'd stay further, though, so that opens up even more options. He said he'd have no problem going further, so I suppose he could develop into a Cup horse. He's travelled the world and is very professional now".

Idaho's subsequent result were disappointing. He ran fourth to Cracksman in the Coronation Cup and a distant last of the five runners behind Crystal Ocean when attempting to repeat his 2017 success in the Hardwicke Stakes. He was then stepped up to extended distances and finished third to Stradivarius in both the Goodwood Cup on 31 July and the Lonsdale Cup at York on 24 August. On his final appearance Idaho contested the Irish St. Leger at the Curragh on 16 September. He threw off Heffernan exiting the parade ring and made little impact in the race, coming home fifth of the six runners.

== Stud record ==
At the end of the 2018 season Idaho was retired and began his stud career at the Beeches Stud in County Waterford where he was marketed as a National Hunt stallion.

== Pedigree ==
Pedigree of Idaho (IRE), bay colt, 2013
Sire Galileo (IRE) 1998	Sadler's Wells (USA); 1981	Northern Dancer	Nearctic
Sire Galileo (IRE) 1998	Sadler's Wells (USA); 1981	Northern Dancer	Natalma
Sire Galileo (IRE) 1998	Sadler's Wells (USA); 1981	Fairy Bridge	Bold Reason
Sire Galileo (IRE) 1998	Sadler's Wells (USA); 1981	Fairy Bridge	Special
Sire Galileo (IRE) 1998	Urban Sea (USA); 1989	Miswaki	Mr. Prospector
Sire Galileo (IRE) 1998	Urban Sea (USA); 1989	Miswaki	Hopespringeternal
Sire Galileo (IRE) 1998	Urban Sea (USA); 1989	Allegretta	Lombard
Sire Galileo (IRE) 1998	Urban Sea (USA); 1989	Allegretta	Anatevka
Dam Hveger (AUS) 2001	Danehill (USA); 1986	Danzig	Northern Dancer
Dam Hveger (AUS) 2001	Danehill (USA); 1986	Danzig	Pas de Nom
Dam Hveger (AUS) 2001	Danehill (USA); 1986	Razyana	His Majesty
Dam Hveger (AUS) 2001	Danehill (USA); 1986	Razyana	Spring Adieu
Dam Hveger (AUS) 2001	Circles of Gold (AUS); 1991	Marscay	Biscay
Dam Hveger (AUS) 2001	Circles of Gold (AUS); 1991	Marscay	Heart of Market
Dam Hveger (AUS) 2001	Circles of Gold (AUS); 1991	Olympic Aim	Zamazaan
Dam Hveger (AUS) 2001	Circles of Gold (AUS); 1991	Olympic Aim	Gold Vink (Family: 22-b)
