= Highland Reel =

Irish-bred Thoroughbred racehorse

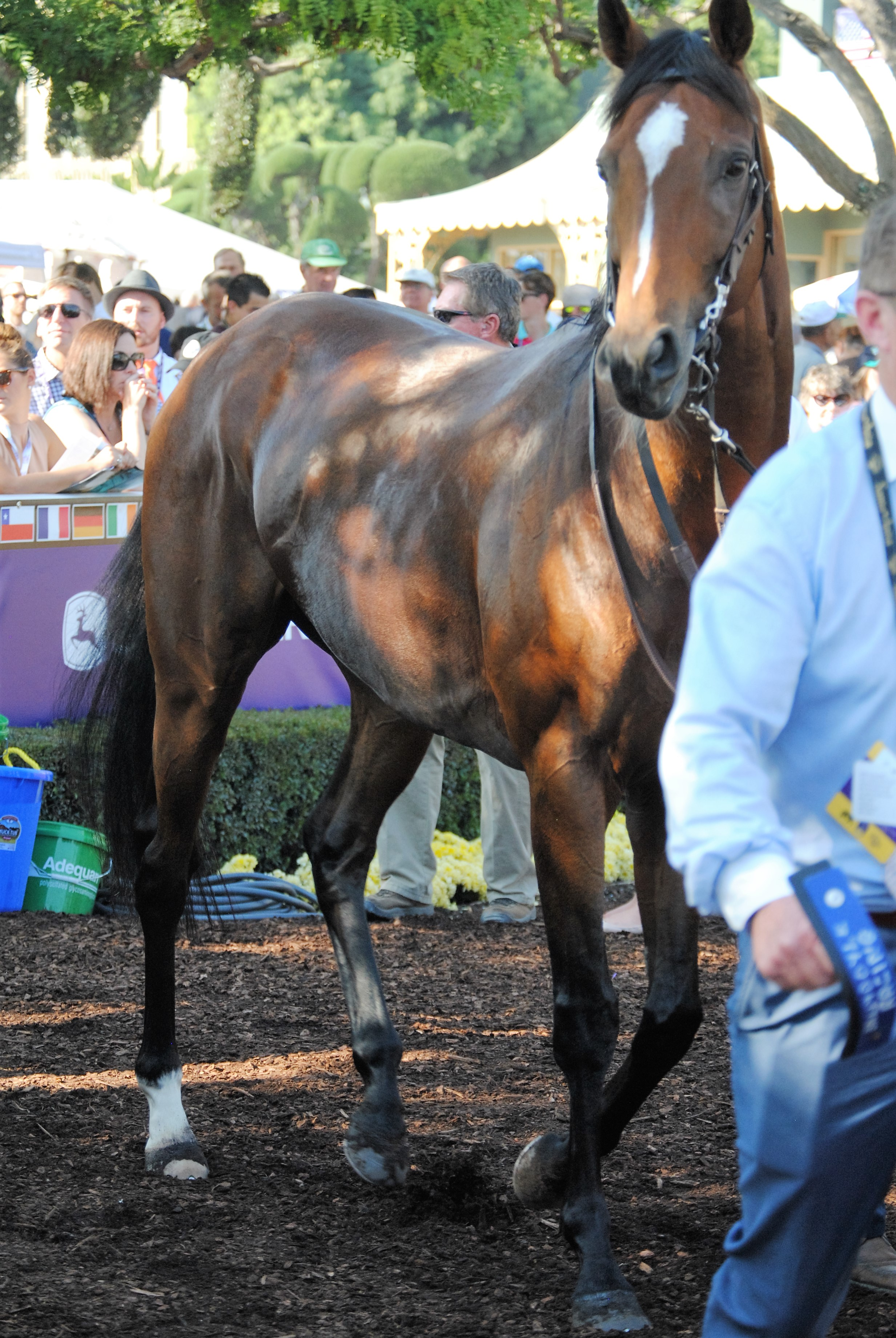
- Highland Reel prior to the 2016 Breeders' Cup Turf
- Sire: Galileo
- Grandsire: Sadler's Wells
- Dam: Hveger
- Damsire: Danehill
- Sex: Stallion
- Foaled: 21 February 2012
- Country: Ireland
- Colour: Bay
- Breeder: Hveger Syndicate
- Owner: Derrick Smith & Susan Magnier & Michael Tabor
- Trainer: Aidan O'Brien
- Record: 27: 10-6-3
- Earnings: £7,513,355

Major wins
- Vintage Stakes (2014); Gordon Stakes (2015); Secretariat Stakes (2015); Hong Kong Vase (2015, 2017); K.George VI & Q. Elizabeth Stakes (2016); Breeders' Cup Turf (2016); Coronation Cup (2017); Prince of Wales's Stakes (2017)

Highland Reel (foaled 21 February 2012) is an Irish Thoroughbred racehorse. In a career running from June 2014 to December 2017 he raced in Ireland, Britain, France, the United States, Australia, Hong Kong and Dubai, and recorded seven victories at Group 1 or Grade 1 level in the Secretariat Stakes, Hong Kong Vase (twice), King George VI & Queen Elizabeth Stakes, Breeders' Cup Turf, Coronation Cup and Prince of Wales's Stakes. He was also placed in the Prix du Jockey Club, Cox Plate, International Stakes, Prix de l'Arc de Triomphe and Champion Stakes. He holds the record for the greatest amount of prize money earned by a racehorse trained in Europe.

== Background ==
Highland Reel is a bay horse with a white blaze and a white sock on his right hind leg bred in Ireland by the Hveger Syndicate. He was sired by Galileo, who won the Derby, Irish Derby and King George VI and Queen Elizabeth Stakes in 2001. Galileo is now one of the world's leading stallions and has been champion sire of Great Britain and Ireland five times. His other progeny include Cape Blanco, Frankel, Golden Lilac, Nathaniel, New Approach, Rip Van Winkle and Ruler of the World. Highland Reel's dam Hveger was an Australian mare who finished third in the Australasian Oaks in 2005. As a daughter of the AJC Oaks winner Circles of Gold she was a full-sister to Elvstroem and a close relative of Starspangledbanner.

As a yearling in October 2013 Highland Reel was offered for sale at Tattersalls and was bought for 460,000 guineas by the bloodstock agent John Warren on behalf of John Magnier's Coolmore Stud. Highland Reel entered training with Aidan O'Brien at Ballydoyle. Like many Coolmore horses, the exact details of Highland Reel's ownership have changed from race to race: he has raced in the colours of Michael Tabor, Derrick Smith and the partnership of Tabor, Smith and Susan Magnier.

== Racing career ==
=== 2014: two-year-old season ===
On his first racecourse appearance, Highland Reel contested a seven furlong maiden race at Leopardstown Racecourse on 12 June and finished strongly to take second place, beaten three quarters of a length by the Dermot Weld-trained Tombelaine. Nineteen days later the colt started 8/15 favourite in a one-mile maiden at Gowran Park. Ridden by his trainer's son Joseph O'Brien he took the lead two furlongs out and drew away from his opponents to win "easily" by twelve lengths from Taqaseem. On 30 July Highland Reel was stepped up in class when he was sent to England for the Group Three Vintage Stakes over seven furlongs at Goodwood Racecourse. With Joseph O'Brien again in the saddle he started the 10/11 favourite with the best of his seven opponents appearing to be Ahlan Emarati (placed in the Norfolk Stakes and Railway Stakes). After racing in mid-division he took the lead inside the final furlong and won by 2 1/4 lengths from Tupi.

=== 2015: three-year-old season ===
Highland Reel began his second season with two races in France, both of them at Group One level. On 10 May, despite an absence of 9 1/2 months he started favourite for the Poule d'Essai des Poulains over 1600 metres at Longchamp Racecourse but finished sixth of the eighteen runners behind Make Believe. Three weeks later he contested the Prix du Jockey Club over 2000 metres at Chantilly Racecourse and finished second, beaten 1 1/2 lengths by New Bay. Four weeks later Highland Reel started the 11/4 second favourite behind Jack Hobbs in the Irish Derby at the Curragh. He sweated up before the race and finished fifth of the eight runners. After three consecutive Group One races, Highland Reel was dropped in class for the Group Three Gordon Stakes at Goodwood on 29 July in which he was ridden by Joseph O'Brien and started the 7/4 favourite. The best-fancied of his eight rivals were Medrano (Glasgow Stakes), Scottish (runner-up in the King George V Stakes) and Disegno (third to Golden Horn in the Feilden Stakes). After being hampered in the early stages, Highland Reel settled in fourth place before moving forward in the straight, taking the lead inside the final furlong and winning by 1 1/2 lengths from Scottish.

In August Highland Reel was sent to the United States for the Grade I Secretariat Stakes at Arlington Park in which he was ridden by Seamie Heffernan. He started second favourite behind the Belmont Derby winner Force The Pass whilst the other runners included Green Dispatch (Prix de Guiche) from France and Goldstream (Derby Italiano) from Italy. In a race run in heavy rain, Highland Reel went to the front from the start, set a steady pace, accelerated on the final turn and drew away to win by five and a quarter lengths from Closing Bell. After race Heffernan said that the colt "won easy", while Aidan O'Brien's assistant T J Comeford commented "There was so little pace in the race, if we couldn't make the lead and then make all, we didn't deserve to win". On his return to Europe he started the 16/1 outsider in an exceptionally strong seven-runner field for the Irish Champion Stakes and finished fifth behind Golden Horn, Found, Free Eagle and Pleascach.

Highland Reel's travels continued in October when he was shipped to Australia to contest the Cox Plate over 2000 metres at Moonee Valley Racecourse, a race which his stable had won with Adelaide in 2014. Ridden by Moore, he raced close behind the leaders but was unable to make any significant progress in the closing stages and finished third of the fourteen runners behind Winx. On his final appearance of the season the colt ran in the Hong Kong Vase at Sha Tin Racecourse and started the 5/1 second favourite behind Flintshire. The other runners included Cirrus des Aigles, Dominant (winner of the race in 2013), Cannock Chase (Canadian International Stakes), Dariyan (Prix Eugène Adam) Preferment (Turnbull Stakes) and Ming Dynasty (Prix du Conseil de Paris). After taking an early lead he was settled in third place by Ryan Moore before producing a strong late run in the straight. He overtook Flintshire inside the last 200 metres and won by 1 1/2 lengths with Dariyan taking third ahead of Ming Dynasty. After the race Moore commented "He really wanted it. Flintshire is a very high-class horse and he takes a lot of beating in races like this. He has had plenty of exposure around the world and a lot of experience."

=== 2016: four-year-old season ===
Highland Reel began his third season with a journey to the United Arab Emirates for the Dubai Sheema Classic on 26 March and finished fourth behind Postponed, Duramente and Last Impact. He was back in Hong Kong in April for the Queen Elizabeth II Cup but met trouble in running and finished eighth behind Werther. At Royal Ascot in June he ran in Europe for the first time in nine months when he was ridden by Heffernan in the Group Two Hardwicke Stakes. In a closely contested finish he was beaten a head into second place by the Queen's colt Dartmouth after Heffernan dropped his whip a quarter of a mile from the finish.

On 23 July, over the same course and distance, Highland Reel faced a rematch with Dartmouth in Britain's most prestigious weight-for-age race, the King George VI and Queen Elizabeth Stakes. The other five runners were Erupt (Grand Prix de Paris), Wings of Desire (Dante Stakes, fourth in the 2016 Epsom Derby), Sir Isaac Newton (International Stakes, Wolferton Handicap), Western Hymn (Brigadier Gerard Stakes, Prix Eugène Adam, Gordon Richards Stakes) and Second Step (Jockey Club Stakes, Grosser Preis von Berlin). Starting the 13/8 favourite he led from the start and set a steady pace from Erupt, Wings of Desire and Sir Isaac Newton. In the straight he held off a sustained challenge from Wings of Desire to win by 1 1/4 lengths with Dartmouth 2 3/4 lengths back in third place. Highland Reel was then dropped in distance for the International Stakes over 10 1/2 furlongs at York Racecourse and started the 6/1 joint second favourite behind Postponed. Ridden by Heffernan, he was among the leaders from the start and stayed on well in the straight to finish second behind the favourite with The Grey Gatsby, Hawkbill and Wings of Desire unplaced.

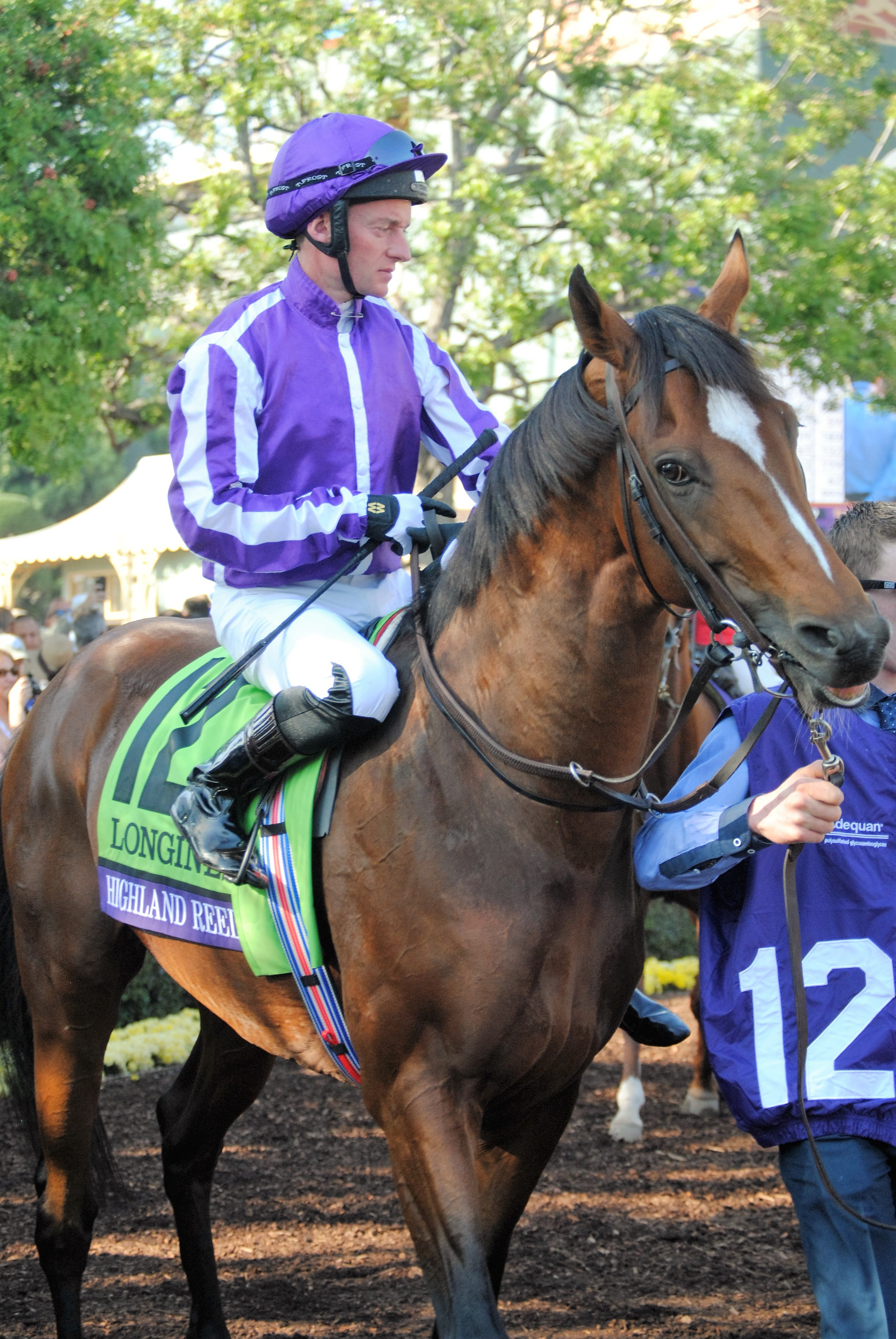
Highland Reel with Seamie Heffernan before winning the Breeders' Cup Turf

Highland Reel reappeared in a strong renewal of the Irish Champion Stakes on 10 September when he was ridden by Colm O'Donoghue. He briefly took the lead in the straight but was outpaced in the closing stages and finished seventh behind the French colt Almanzor. On 2 October the colt was ridden by Heffernan and started a 24/1 for the 2016 Prix de l'Arc de Triomphe which was run at Chantilly as Longchamp was closed for redevelopment. After tracking the leaders he stayed on strongly in the straight to finish second, a length and three quarters behind his stablemate Found.

On 5 November at Santa Anita Park Highland Reel, ridden by Heffernan, started third favourite behind Flintshire and Found for the $4 million Breeders' Cup Turf. The other nine runners included Ectot, Ashleyluvssugar (Del Mar Handicap), Da Big Hoss (American St. Leger Stakes), Mondialiste (Arlington Million), Ulysses (an improving three-year-old from Europe) and the veteran Twilight Eclipse (Man o' War Stakes). Breaking quickly from an outside draw, Highland Reel took the lead soon after the start and set a steady pace before kicking seven lengths clear of his opponents at half way. He maintained a clear advantage into the straight and stayed on to win by 1 3/4 lengths from Flintshire, with Found staying on to take third place. After the race Aidan O'Brien said "We knew that he gets a mile-and-a-half well, that he handles fast ground and doesn’t mind dictating, so it was straightforward really, but Seamus executed it brilliantly. He controlled the race perfectly. He kicked at the right time, and really the race was over from a long way out... he's an incredibly versatile horse that loves travelling".

As in the previous year, Highland Reel ended his season with a run in the Hong Kong Vase and started the 1/2 favourite to repeat his 2015 success. Ridden by Moore, he went to the front from the start, regained the advantage after being headed by the British-trained Big Orange, and galloped three lengths clear of his rivals in the straight. He looked certain to win but was overtaken in the final strides and beaten half a length by the Japanese challenger Satono Crown with a gap of almost seven lengths back to One Foot In Heaven in third place.

=== 2017: five-year-old season ===
As in the previous year, Highland Reel began his 2017 campaign with a run in the Dubai Sheema Classic in March. Starting the 5/2 second favourite he took the early lead but faded badly after being headed in the straight and finished last of the seven runners behind Jack Hobbs. On his first start after his return to Europe Highland Reel started the 9/4 favourite in the Coronation Cup at Epsom Racecourse on 2 June. A technical fault on the plane scheduled to deliver the horse to Epsom meant that he arrived at the course much later than expected. His nine rivals included Journey, Hawkbill, US Army Ranger, Idaho and the improving handicapper Frontiersman. Ridden by Moore, he set the pace as usual, saw off a sustained challenge from Hawkbill and stayed on well to win by 1 3/4 lengths from Frontiersman. After the race O'Brien said "I'm delighted with him, he's obviously gone through a lot today, and just before the race, but Ryan gave him a great ride. He hadn't run since Dubai, but he was brilliant... He's an amazing horse this, he's tough, he has tactical speed and he stays."

On his next appearance Highland Reel was dropped back to ten furlongs for a rematch with Jack Hobbs in the Prince of Wales's Stakes at Royal Ascot. The other six runners included Ulysses, Decorated Knight (Tattersalls Gold Cup), Mekhtaal (Prix d'Ispahan) and Queen's Trust (Breeders' Cup Filly and Mare Turf). After racing in second behind the pacemaker Scottish he took the lead in the straight but was immediately challenged by Ulysses and Decorated Knight. He lost the lead inside the final furlong but rallied to regain the advantage and pulled ahead to win by 1 1/4 lengths from Decorated Knight.

In Breeders' Cup Turf, Highland Reel finished in third, behind the Godolphin owned Talismanic. In his final race, Highland Reel won his second Hong Kong Vase by defeating Talismanic.

== Assessment ==
In the 2015 World's Best Racehorse Rankings Highland Reel was rated the eleventh-best three-year-old colt and the twenty-seventh best racehorse in the world.

In the 2016 edition of the World's Best Racehorse Rankings Highland Reel was given a rating of 123, making him the 12th best racehorse in the world.

In the 2017 World's Best Racehorse Rankings, Highland Reel was rated the twelfth-best horse in the world, and the joint-best horse in Ireland.

== Pedigree ==
Pedigree of Highland Reel (IRE), bay colt, 2012
Sire Galileo (IRE) 1998	Sadler's Wells (USA); 1981	Northern Dancer	Nearctic
Sire Galileo (IRE) 1998	Sadler's Wells (USA); 1981	Northern Dancer	Natalma
Sire Galileo (IRE) 1998	Sadler's Wells (USA); 1981	Fairy Bridge	Bold Reason
Sire Galileo (IRE) 1998	Sadler's Wells (USA); 1981	Fairy Bridge	Special
Sire Galileo (IRE) 1998	Urban Sea (USA); 1989	Miswaki	Mr. Prospector
Sire Galileo (IRE) 1998	Urban Sea (USA); 1989	Miswaki	Hopespringeternal
Sire Galileo (IRE) 1998	Urban Sea (USA); 1989	Allegretta	Lombard
Sire Galileo (IRE) 1998	Urban Sea (USA); 1989	Allegretta	Anatevka
Dam Hveger (AUS) 2001	Danehill (USA); 1986	Danzig	Northern Dancer
Dam Hveger (AUS) 2001	Danehill (USA); 1986	Danzig	Pas de Nom
Dam Hveger (AUS) 2001	Danehill (USA); 1986	Razyana	His Majesty
Dam Hveger (AUS) 2001	Danehill (USA); 1986	Razyana	Spring Adieu
Dam Hveger (AUS) 2001	Circles of Gold (AUS); 1991	Marscay	Biscay
Dam Hveger (AUS) 2001	Circles of Gold (AUS); 1991	Marscay	Heart of Market
Dam Hveger (AUS) 2001	Circles of Gold (AUS); 1991	Olympic Aim	Zamazaan
Dam Hveger (AUS) 2001	Circles of Gold (AUS); 1991	Olympic Aim	Gold Vink (Family: 22-b)
