= 2016 Epsom Derby =

- Epsom Derby
- Location: Epsom Downs Racecourse
- Date: 4 June 2016
- Winning horse: Harzand
- Starting price: 13/2
- Jockey: Pat Smullen
- Trainer: Dermot Weld
- Owner: Aga Khan IV
- Conditions: Good to soft

Epsom Derby 2016
1-2-3
Harzand	Us Army Ranger	Idaho

Also Ran
4-5-6
Wings of Desire	Humphrey Bogart	Red Verdon
7-8-9
Algometer	Cloth Of Stars	Massaat
10-11-12
Across The Stars	Deauville	Ulysses
13-14-15
Biodynamic	Port Douglas	Shogun
16
Moonlight Magic	16 Ran	2m 40.09s

The 2016 Epsom Derby was the 237th annual running of the Derby horse race and took place at Epsom Downs Racecourse on 4 June 2016. The race was won by the Aga Khan's Harzand, ridden by Pat Smullen and trained in Ireland by Dermot Weld. Harzand's victory was the first in the race for his jockey and trainer, and the fifth for his owner, who had prior wins with Shergar, Shahrastani, Kahyasi and Sinndar.

== Race synopsis ==
=== Entries and race build-up ===
The initial entry for the 2016 Epsom Derby, announced in December 2014, consisted of 475 yearlings. Amongst the entries was a brother to the unbeaten Frankel, and a son of Midday. The number of entries was an increase of 66 on the initial entry for the 2015 race, and included 53 horses from the Godolphin Racing organisation and 77 from the Coolmore Stud. The number of potential runners was reduced to 136 at the first scratching date in March 2016 with Foundation (trained by John Gosden) and Midterm, the son of Midday, (Michael Stoute) heading the betting market at odds of 12 to 1. Aidan O'Brien trained 36 of the runners left in the race. A further 9 horses were added at the second entry stage in April 2016 at a cost of £8,000 per entry. The second entries included Carntop, bred and owned by Charles, Prince of Wales and Camilla, Duchess of Cornwall.

The field began to take its final shape on 20 May when twenty-two horses were left entered at the final forfeit stage. Amongst those remaining in the race were trial winners US Army Ranger (Chester Vase), Harzand (Ballysax Stakes) and Moonlight Magic (Derrinstown Stud Derby Trial) along with the Classic winner The Gurkha (Poule d'Essai des Poulains) and Awtaad, who won the Irish 2,000 Guineas just after the confirmations were announced. Thirteen of the remaining entries were trained in Ireland, including eight from Aidan O'Brien's stable.

Final confirmations for the race took place on Monday 30 May leaving a potential field of eighteen runners. Wings of Desire, Cloth of Stars, Humphrey Bogart and Red Verdon were supplemented at a cost of £75,000 and the additional entries made the prize money £1.45m and meant that the 2016 Derby would be the most valuable horse race ever staged in Great Britain. Awtaad and The Gurkha were both withdrawn at this stage. Some rain was forecast for the week prior to the race with Epsom clerk of the course Andrew Cooper saying ""There are bits and pieces of rain in the forecast for Wednesday and Thursday but by the end of the week it’ll be getting drier and a bit warmer. If we get the 5mm, I expect the going will be at or near ‘good’ for Friday and a bit faster than that for Saturday." Bookmakers odds the following day suggested an open race with no clear-cut favourite. US Army Ranger and Wings of Desire quoted at 4 to 1 joint favourites by Coral with Ulysses and Cloth of Stars at 6 to 1. On Wednesday 1 June Cooper changed the going to "soft, good to soft in places" after 22mm of rain fell on Tuesday.

Declarations for the race were made on Thursday 2 June and Aidan O'Brien withdrew both Beacon Rock and Bravery. There were no other withdrawals and a field of sixteen declared runners was left for the 2016 Derby.

Early jockey plans for the race included Andrea Atzeni being booked for Michael Stoute's Ulysses on 21 May and Kieren Fallon booked for the same trainer's Across the Stars. Fallon won the Derby in 2003 on Kris Kin for Across the Star's owner, Saeed Suhail, also trained by Stoute.

=== Trial races ===
The first significant trial race for the 2016 Derby took place at Leopardstown on 10 April when a field of seven colts contested the Ballysax Stakes. The race was won by the 2/1 favourite Harzand, trained by Dermot Weld. Harzand beat Idaho by a length and a quarter and was subsequently quoted at odds of between 16/1 and 25/1 for the Derby and his trainer stated he would be "keeping an open mind" about targets for the colt. Jockey Pat Smullen felt that Harzand was "... too big and heavy for Epsom. He is more of an Irish Derby horse and the St Leger distance would be ideal."

Epsom staged the Investec Derby Trial on 20 April. Although the race is run on the same racecourse as the Derby itself and gives a free entry to the Derby for the winner, it "struggles to attract leading Derby contenders". The 2016 race failed to improve this reputation as it was won by a filly, So Mi Dar, whose trainer John Gosden intended to run her in the Epsom Oaks. So Mi Dar subsequently won the Musidora Stakes but was ruled out of the Oaks by injury. The favourite for the Derby Trial, Claudio Monteverdi, finished fourth and appeared uncomfortable on the Epsom track.

On 22 April the Bet365 Classic Trial was run at Sandown Park. The race saw the seasonal debut of Midterm, one of the winter favourites for the Derby, who started at odds of 8/11 for this race. Midterm, ridden by Ryan Moore, won by one and a half lengths from Algometer and his odds for the Derby were subsequently reduced to 6/1 by some bookmakers. The horse's trainer, Sir Michael Stoute, felt that Midterm had to run well to even consider a run in the Derby and stated that the colt's next race would either be at Chester or York.

Newmarket Racecourse's Guineas Festival on 30 April and 1 May threw up three winners with possible Derby hopes. The 2000 Guineas was won by Galileo Gold, owned by Sheikh Joaan Al Thani's Al Shaqab Racing. Galileo Gold was quoted after the race at odds of 6 to 1 for the Derby by the bookmakers William Hill and 10 to 1 by Ladbrokes. The same afternoon's Listed Newmarket Stakes was won by Godolphin's Hawkbill, trained by Charlie Appleby. Hawkbill won by a length and a quarter from Abdon with the favourite, Sky Kingdom, a further length away in third. Godolphin's racing manager, John Ferguson, said after the race that Hawkbill would be able to run over longer distances than the ten-furlong Newmarket Stakes, and that the Derby and its French equivalent the Prix du Jockey-Club were possible targets. The third race with an impact on the Derby betting was the 1000 Guineas, restricted to fillies, which was won by Minding, owned by Coolmore and trained in Ireland by Aidan O'Brien. Minding's three-and-a-half length win prompted the Ladbrokes bookmaking company to quote her at odds of 5 to 2 for the Derby "with a run", allowing gamblers to back her at those odds and have their stake refunded if she does not run in the race. O'Brien was non-committal when asked about future plans for Minding, stating that the Irish 1,000 Guineas and Epsom Oaks were also possible targets, and saying that ""Obviously [the owners] will talk about that but all those things are open to her. I suppose they're going to talk about it and see what everyone wants to do."

The first of two trials at Chester's May meeting was run on 5 May and was notable for the appearance of the Aidan O'Brien-trained US Army Ranger, favourite for the Derby itself, if Minding's odds were overlooked. US Army Ranger was sent off at odds of 4 to 11 and won by the narrow margin of a short head from Port Douglas, also trained by O'Brien. US Army Ranger's jockey Ryan Moore felt that the colt would improve for the run, saying "He's a baby, it's only his second run and he made his debut five weeks ago – he'll learn plenty." Bookmakers reacted by increasing US Army Ranger's Derby odds to a general 5 to 1, with Midterm favourite at 7 to 2. The second trial of the meeting, the Dee Stakes, took place on 6 May and had little bearing on the Derby betting as the winner, Viren's Army, does not have an entry in the classic. The owners, Middleham Park Racing, said after the race "Whether he's up to something like the Derby is debatable. There's no definite plan but we'll have a chat and see what there is for him."

The Lingfield Derby Trial at Lingfield Park on 7 May provided another trial winner with no entry in the Derby when Humphrey Bogart beat Carntop by half a length. Humphrey Bogart's owners, Chelsea Thoroughbreds, suggested after the race that they would look at paying the £75,000 required to enter the colt for the Derby with representative Richard Morecambe saying "it appears to be a weaker year" and they were "very very temped" to enter. Trainer Richard Hannon Jr. said "We’ll sleep on it, that's what we should say".

The day after the Lingfield trial Leopardstown staged the Derrinstown Stud Derby Trial over 1 mile 2 furlongs. The victory went to Moonlight Magic, trained by Jim Bolger and ridden by Kevin Manning, Moolight Magic beat Shogun by a length and a quarter and was cut to odds of 16 to 1 for the Derby. Bolger favoured a run at Epsom in his post-race comments, saying "I have to discuss it with the mentors, and arrive at a decision, but I would love to go...he's a very versatile horse, he could operate from a mile to a mile and a half, and is a very classic horse – the dam is a half-sister to Galileo and Sea the Stars. I’ll respect the opposition, but I won't fear them ... as usual."

Sunday 8 May also saw a major trial race in France, the Prix Greffulhe at Saint-Cloud. Godolphin Racing's Cloth Of Stars, trained by André Fabre won by two and a half lengths from Robin Of Navan. Cloth Of Stars is not entered for the Derby but Godolphin's chief executive John Ferguson stated that they would be willing to enter the colt at the supplementary stage, saying "We now know that the Prix du Jockey Club is a serious possibility, but there is also Epsom so we’ll see how he trains between now and then".

York's Dante Stakes took place on 12 May with Midterm sent off as favourite. The race resulted in a win for Wings Of Desire, trained by John Gosden and ridden by Frankie Dettori, with Midterm unplaced. The winner was quoted at odds of around 4 to 1 for the Derby, alongside US Army Ranger, after the win and Gosden indicated that Wings Of Desire would be entered for the Derby at the supplementary stage, saying that "he showed me things early on, I thought 'goodness'. he's so laid back". Deauville finished as runner-up and is an intended runner in the Prix du Jockey-Club. Midterm was subsequently found to be suffering a hamstring injury after the race, and a further scan showed a stress fracture of the pelvis. This injury led to him being ruled out of the Derby on 20 May.

Two French races with a possible bearing on the Epsom Derby were run on Sunday 15 May. The Poule d'Essai des Poulains is France's equivalent of the 2000 Guineas and was run at Deauville as the regular venue at Longchamp is closed for redevelopment during 2016. The race was won by Aidan O'Brien's runner, The Gurkha, ridden by Ryan Moore. The Gurkha won by five and a half lengths and his Derby odds were reduced from 20 to 1 to 6 to 1 after his victory. O'Brien did not immediately confirm that the colt would run at Epsom, saying after the race ""He has three options now: the St James's Palace, the French Derby and the Epsom Derby". The Prix Hocquart at the same Deauville meeting went to Mekhtaal, trained by Jean-Claude Rouget and ridden by Gregory Benoist. Harry Herbert, racing advisor to Mekhtaal's owner Al-Shaqab Racing, said afterwards "I think we will probably go for the Prix du Jockey Club with him and keep him in France."

On 20 May Goodwood staged the Cocked Hat Stakes over 1 mile and 3 furlongs. The race was won by Algometer, who had finished second to Midterm in the Bet365 Classic Trial in April. Algometer, ridden by Jim Crowley won by half a length from the favourite, Prize Money, and was available at odds of between 25 to 1 and 33 to 1 for the Derby. The colt looked an unlikely runner at Epsom as trainer David Simcock believed he would need soft going to be able to run. Simcock identified the Irish Derby and St Leger in September as Algometer's targets, stating "If it rained at Epsom we might think about it, but, realistically, the Leger is the right race for him later in the year. If it doesn't rain at Epsom we'll leave it and go to [the Irish Derby]."

=== Final entries ===
The final supplementary entry stage on 30 May saw four owners paying £75,000 each to enter their horses in the race. The supplementary entries were Wings of Desire, Cloth of Stars, Humphrey Bogart and Red Verdon. Two days before the race the Ballydoyle stable withdrew Beacon Rock and Bravery to leave a final field of sixteen.

=== Race ===
US Army Ranger started the 7/2 favourite ahead of Wings of Desire on 6/1 and Harzand at 13/2 whilst Cloth of Stars and Ulysses shared fourth place in the betting on 8/1. Port Douglas went to the front from the start and set the pace in the early stages. Moonlight Magic, Cloth of Stars and Massaat were close behind with Harzand. Ulysses and Idaho in mid-division and US Army Ranger and Wings of Desire. Port Douglas led the field into the straight ahead of Cloth of Stars, Massaat, Moonlight Magic and Idaho. The leaders began to struggle approaching the final quarter mile and Idaho went to the front with Harzand emerging as his main challenger as US Army Ranger began to make rapid progress on the wide outside. Harzand gained the advantage approaching the final furlong and repelled a sustained challenge from US Army Ranger to win by one and a half lengths. Idaho took third place, five lengths ahead of Wings of Desire in fourth.

== Race card ==
No	Draw	Horse	Weight (st–lb)	Jockey	Trainer	Owner
1	6	Across The Stars (IRE)	9–0	Kieren Fallon	Sir Michael Stoute	Saeed Suhail
2	4	Algometer	9–0	Jim Crowley	David Simcock	Kirsten Rausing
3	7	Biodynamic	9–0	Dougie Costello	Karl Burke	Hubert John Strecker
4	14	Cloth of Stars (IRE)	9–0	Mickael Barzalona	André Fabre (FR)	Godolphin
5	12	Deauville (IRE)	9–0	Jamie Spencer	Aidan O'Brien (IRE)	Tabor / Smith / Magnier / Hay
6	9	Harzand (IRE)	9–0	Pat Smullen	Dermot Weld (IRE)	HH Aga Khan
7	2	Humphrey Bogart (IRE)	9–0	Sean Levey	Richard Hannon Jr.	Chelsea Thoroughbreds – Saint Tropez
8	8	Idaho (IRE)	9–0	Seamie Heffernan	Aidan O'Brien (IRE)	Tabor / Smith / Magnier
9	11	Massaat (IRE)	9–0	Paul Hanagan	Owen Burrows	Hamdan Al Maktoum
10	1	Moonlight Magic	9–0	Kevin Manning	Jim Bolger (IRE)	Godolphin
11	10	Port Douglas (IRE)	9–0	Colm O'Donoghue	Aidan O'Brien (IRE)	Tabor / Smith / Magnier
12	16	Red Verdon	9–0	Silvestre de Sousa	Ed Dunlop	Ronald Arculli
13	5	Shogun (IRE)	9–0	Donnacha O'Brien	Aidan O'Brien (IRE)	Tabor / Smith / Magnier / O'Brien
14	3	Ulysses (IRE)	9–0	Andrea Atzeni	Sir Michael Stoute	Flaxman Holdings
15	15	US Army Ranger (IRE)	9–0	Ryan Moore	Aidan O'Brien (IRE)	Tabor / Smith / Magnier
16	13	Wings of Desire	9–0	Frankie Dettori	John Gosden	Carole, Lady Bamford

Trainers are based in Great Britain unless indicated.

== Full result ==
	Dist *	Horse	Jockey	Trainer	SP
1		Harzand	Pat Smullen	Dermot Weld (IRE)	13/2
2	1½	US Army Ranger	Ryan Moore	Aidan O'Brien (IRE)	7/2F
3	1¼	Idaho	Seamie Heffernan	Aidan O'Brien (IRE)	14/1
4	5	Wings of Desire	Frankie Dettori	John Gosden	6/1
5	3	Humphrey Bogart	Sean Levey	Richard Hannon Jr.	25/1
6	1	Red Verdon	Silvestre de Sousa	Ed Dunlop	20/1
7	2	Algometer	Jim Crowley	David Simcock	33/1
8	2	Cloth of Stars	Mickael Barzalona	André Fabre (FR)	8/1
9	nse	Massaat	Paul Hanagan	Owen Burrows	11/1
10	3	Across The Stars	Kieren Fallon	Michael Stoute	25/1
11	3	Deauville	Jamie Spencer	Aidan O'Brien (IRE)	14/1
12	1¼	Ulysses	Andrea Atzeni	Michael Stoute	8/1
13	6	Biodynamic	Dougie Costello	Karl Burke	100/1
14	7	Port Douglas	Colm O'Donoghue	Aidan O'Brien (IRE)	16/1
15	7	Shogun	Donnacha O'Brien	Aidan O'Brien (IRE)	33/1
16	11	Moonlight Magic	Kevin Manning	Jim Bolger (IRE)	14/1

Winning time: 2 min 40.09sec

* The distances between the horses are shown in lengths or shorter; nse = nose; hd = head.
† Trainers are based in Great Britain unless indicated.

== Form analysis ==
=== Two-year-old races ===
Notable runs by the future Derby participants as two-year-olds in 2015:

- Cloth of Stars – 1st in Prix des Chênes, 3rd in Prix de Condé, 2nd in Critérium de Saint-Cloud
- Deauville – 1st in Tyros Stakes, 2nd in Royal Lodge Stakes, 5th in Racing Post Trophy
- Humphrey Bogart – 4th in Acomb Stakes, 4th in Royal Lodge Stakes
- Idaho – 4th in Critérium de Saint-Cloud
- Massaat – 2nd in Dewhurst Stakes
- Moonlight Magic – 1st in Eyrefield Stakes
- Port Douglas – 4th in Canford Cliffs Stakes, 1st in Beresford Stakes, 4th in Racing Post Trophy
- Shogun – 3rd in Futurity Stakes, 6th in Prix Jean-Luc Lagardère, 10th in Breeders' Cup Juvenile Turf

=== Road to Epsom ===
Early-season appearances in 2016 and trial races prior to running in the Derby:

- Across The Stars – 3rd in Lingfield Derby Trial
- Algometer – 2nd in Bet365 Classic Trial, 1st in Cocked Hat Stakes
- Biodynamic – 4th in Chester Vase
- Cloth Of Stars – 1st in Prix La Force, 1st in Prix Greffulhe
- Deauville – 2nd in Dante Stakes
- Harzand – 1st in Ballysax Stakes
- Humphrey Bogart – 1st in Lingfield Derby Trial
- Idaho – 2nd in Ballysax Stakes, 3rd in Derrinstown Stud Derby Trial
- Massaat – 2nd in 2000 Guineas Stakes
- Moonlight Magic – 5th in Ballysax Stakes, 1st in Derrinstown Stud Derby Trial
- Port Douglas – 2nd in Chester Vase
- Shogun – 2nd in Derrinstown Stud Derby Trial
- US Army Ranger – 1st in Chester Vase
- Wings Of Desire – 1st in Dante Stakes

=== Subsequent Group 1 wins ===
Group 1 / Grade I victories after running in the Derby:

- Cloth of Stars – Prix Ganay (2017)
- Harzand – Irish Derby (2016)
- Deauville – Belmont Derby (2016)
- Ulysses – Eclipse Stakes (2017), International Stakes (2017)
