= Galileo Rock =

Irish-bred Thoroughbred racehorse

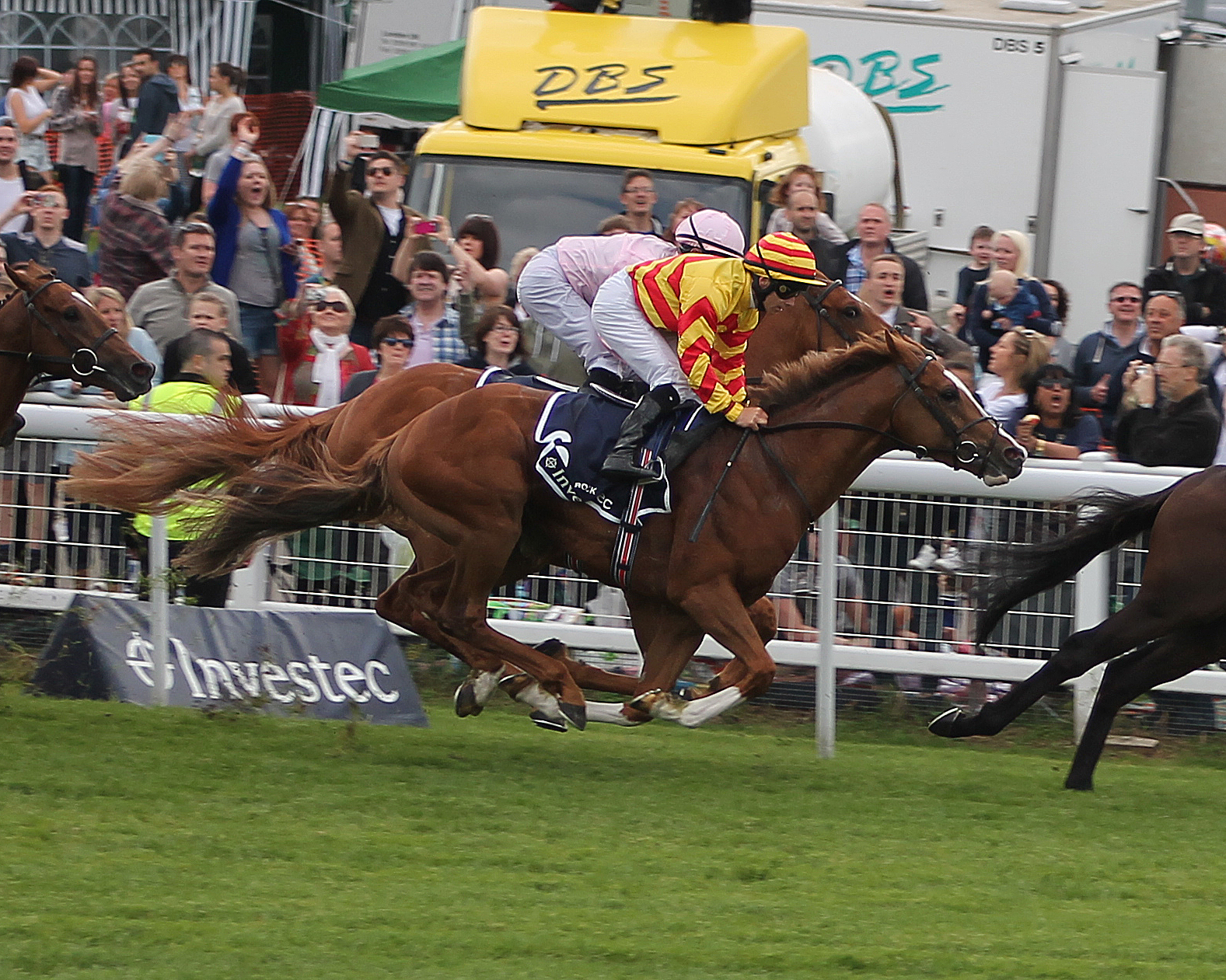
- Galileo Rock at 2013 Epsom Derby.
- Sire: Galileo
- Grandsire: Sadler's Wells
- Dam: Grecian Bride
- Damsire: Groom Dancer
- Sex: Colt
- Foaled: 18 April 2010
- Country: Ireland
- Colour: Chestnut
- Breeder: Rockfield Farm
- Owner: Michael O'Flynn
- Trainer: David Wachman
- Record: 6: 1-1-3

Galileo Rock (18 April 2010 – 22 January 2014) was an Irish Thoroughbred racehorse. In 2013 he was placed in The Derby, Irish Derby and St Leger Stakes.

== Background ==
Galileo Rock was a chestnut horse with a broad white blaze and three white socks bred in Ireland by Rockfield Farm. He was sired by Galileo the winner of the 2001 Derby who went on to become an outstanding breeding stallion, winning the title of champion sire on four occasions. Galileo's other progeny include Rip Van Winkle, Nathaniel, Cape Blanco, New Approach and Frankel. His dam Grecian Bride came from a family established at the Ballymacoll Stud: her grandmother Edinburgh is also the direct female-line ancestor of Golan and North Light. Grecian Bride has also produced Saddler's Rock, a leading stayer who won both the Doncaster Cup in 2011 Goodwood Cup in 2012.

In September 2011, the yearling was sent to the Goffs sale where he was bought for €150,000 by BBA Ireland and entered the ownership of Michael O'Flynn. He was sent into training with David Wachman at Goolds Cross, County Tipperary. He was ridden in all of his races by Wayne Lordan.

== Racing career ==
=== 2012: two-year-old season ===
Galileo Rock began his racing career in a twelve-runner maiden race at Leopardstown Racecourse on 16 August. After appearing to be struggling early in the straight but took the lead inside the final furlong and drew clear to win easily by seven lengths. In October he was sent to England and moved up in class to contest the Group Three Autumn Stakes. He started at odds of 11/2 and finished fifth of the eleven runners behind Trading Leather.

=== 2013: three-year-old season ===
On his three-year-old debut, Galileo Rock ran in the Classic Trial Stakes at Sandown Park Racecourse on 26 April. The race was dominated by Irish-trained horses, with Sugar Boy winning by a head and three-quarters of a length from Eye of the Storm and the strong-finishing Galileo Rock. The trio finished eight lengths clear of the British colt Libertarian.

On 1 June, Galileo Rock was one of twelve colts to contest the 234th running of the Derby Stakes at Epsom Downs Racecourse. Starting a 25/1 outsider he was among the leaders from the start and moved into second place behind Ruler of the World in the straight. He stayed on in the closing stages but lost second place in the last strides to Libertarian. Four weeks later Galileo Rock started at odds of 9/1 for the Irish Derby at the Curragh Racecourse. Lordan restrained the colt in the early stages before turning into the straight in fifth place. He made steady progress in the last quarter mile to finish second, one and three-quarter length behind Trading Leather, with Ruler of the World in sixth and Libertarian eighth of the nine runners.

On 14 September, Leading Light was one of eleven three-year-olds to contest the 237th running of the St Leger over fourteen and a half furlongs at Doncaster Racecourse. Wachman was doubtful about running the colt on the prevailing soft ground but decided to let him take his chance after walking the course early in the morning of the race. Starting at odds of 6/1 Galileo Rock was settled in third place before moving up on the outside to contest the lead in the straight. He stayed on in the closing stages to finish third behind Leading Light and The Oaks winner Talent. After his third classic placing, Galileo Rock was described as "one of the great nearly horses of this season" by Marcus Armytage. Galileo Rock was scheduled to end his season in the Hong Kong Vase in December, but was withdrawn after sustaining a leg injury on the eve of the race.

In January 2014 it was reported that Galileo Rock had sustained a fatal injury in a training accident.

== Pedigree ==
Pedigree of Galileo Rock (IRE), chestnut colt, 2010
Sire Galileo (IRE) 1998	Sadler's Wells (USA); 1981	Northern Dancer	Nearctic
Sire Galileo (IRE) 1998	Sadler's Wells (USA); 1981	Northern Dancer	Natalma
Sire Galileo (IRE) 1998	Sadler's Wells (USA); 1981	Fairy Bridge	Bold Reason
Sire Galileo (IRE) 1998	Sadler's Wells (USA); 1981	Fairy Bridge	Special
Sire Galileo (IRE) 1998	Urban Sea (USA); 1989	Miswaki	Mr. Prospector
Sire Galileo (IRE) 1998	Urban Sea (USA); 1989	Miswaki	Hopespringseternal
Sire Galileo (IRE) 1998	Urban Sea (USA); 1989	Allegretta	Lombard
Sire Galileo (IRE) 1998	Urban Sea (USA); 1989	Allegretta	Anatevka
Dam Grecian Bride (IRE) 1994	Groom Dancer (USA); 1984	Blushing Groom	Red God
Dam Grecian Bride (IRE) 1994	Groom Dancer (USA); 1984	Blushing Groom	Runaway Bride
Dam Grecian Bride (IRE) 1994	Groom Dancer (USA); 1984	Feathermill	Lyphard
Dam Grecian Bride (IRE) 1994	Groom Dancer (USA); 1984	Feathermill	Lady Berry
Dam Grecian Bride (IRE) 1994	Greektown (IRE); 1985	Ela-Mana-Mou	Pitcairn
Dam Grecian Bride (IRE) 1994	Greektown (IRE); 1985	Ela-Mana-Mou	Rose Bertin
Dam Grecian Bride (IRE) 1994	Greektown (IRE); 1985	Edinburgh	Charlottown
Dam Grecian Bride (IRE) 1994	Greektown (IRE); 1985	Edinburgh	Queens Castle (Family 5-h)
