= Pat Smullen =

Irish jockey (1977–2020)

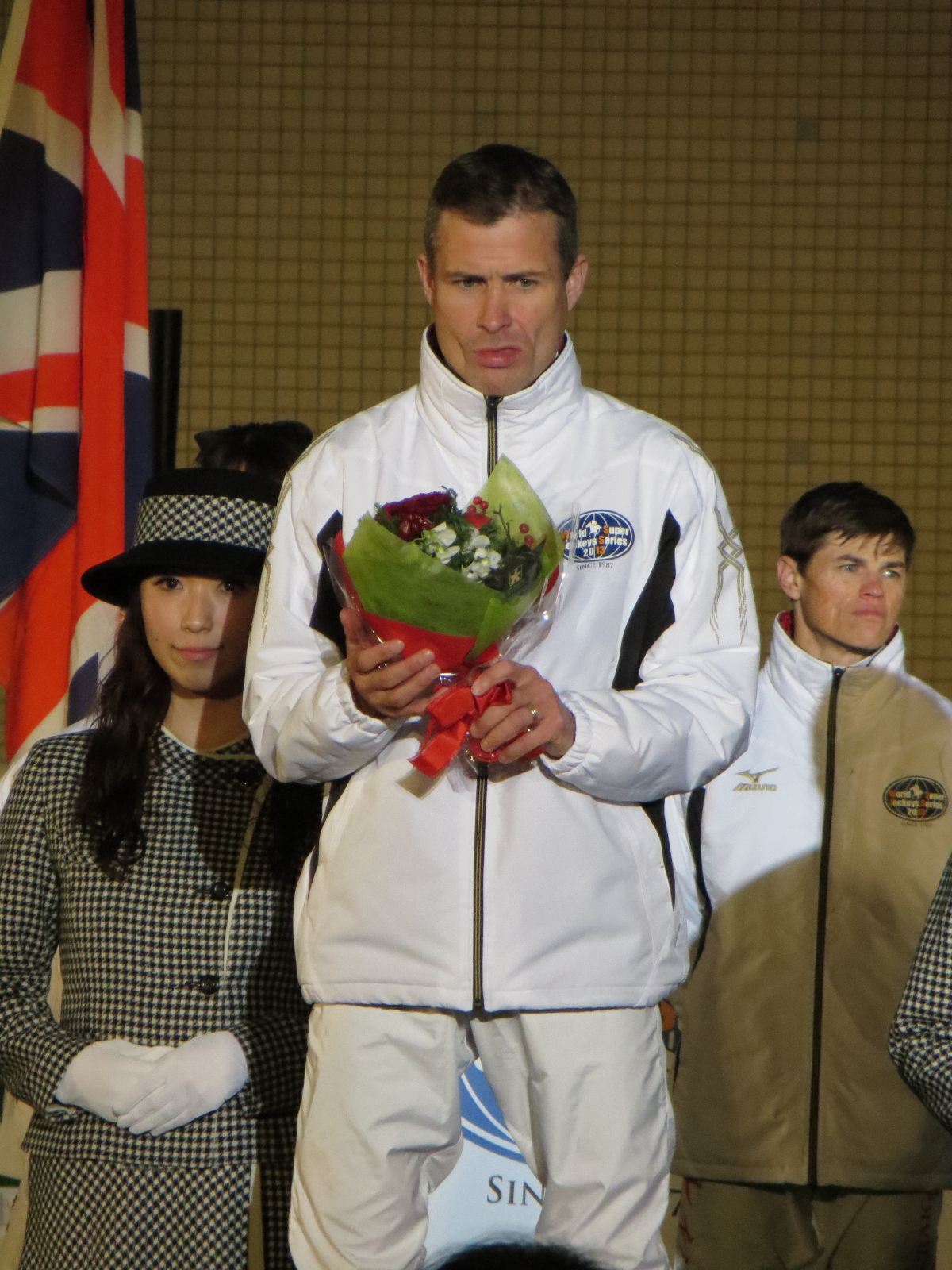
- Pat Smullen in Hanshin Racecourse in 2013
- Born: Patrick Joseph Smullen; 22 May 1977; County Offaly, Ireland
- Died: 15 September 2020 (aged 43); Dublin, Ireland
- Occupation: Jockey

Patrick Joseph Smullen (22 May 1977 – 15 September 2020), was an Irish jockey who won the Irish flat racing Champion Jockey title nine times. In a career running from 1992 to 2018 he rode 1,845 winners in Ireland and 47 in Britain. Amongst his biggest successes were riding Harzand to victories in the Epsom Derby and Irish Derby in 2016. He was stable jockey to Dermot Weld from 1999 until 2018.

== Background and apprenticeship ==
Smullen was born in County Offaly and was introduced to riding and racing by his brother Sean, who worked for trainer Joanna Morgan. He was then apprenticed to local trainer Tommy Lacy, who provided him with his first winner, Vicosa, at Dundalk in 1993. Smullen won the Irish apprentice championship in 1995 and 1996.

== Career ==
Smullen spent two years as a stable jockey to John Oxx, winning his first Group 1 race, the Moyglare Stud Stakes, on Tarascon for trainer Tommy Stack at the Curragh in 1997. In 1999 he became first jockey to trainer Dermot Weld, a position he retained until his retirement in 2018. He was Irish champion jockey in 2000, 2001, 2005, 2007, 2008, 2010, 2014, 2015 and 2016, a total of nine times.

Smullen's first Classic victory came in the Irish St. Leger in 2001 on Vinnie Roe for Dermot Weld. They went on to win the same race the next three years. Other Irish Classic victories came in the 2004 Irish Derby on Grey Swallow, the 2015 Irish Oaks on Covert Love and two Irish 1,000 Guineas on Nighttime and Bethrah. A total of twelve European Classic wins also included the 2016 Epsom Derby and Irish Derby double on Harzand for Dermot Weld and owner the Aga Khan.

In May 2018 Smullen announced his retirement from race riding on medical advice, having undergone chemotherapy and surgery for pancreatic cancer the previous year. He had ridden 1,845 winners in Ireland and 47 in Britain.

== Personal life ==
Smullen married Frances Crowley, trainer and amateur jockey, in 2001. They have three children, Hannah, Paddy and Sarah.

In September 2019 Smullen organised a legends race at the Curragh to raise funds for pancreatic cancer trials and research. Two months later he was honoured at the 2019 Cartier Racing Awards with the Daily Telegraph Award of Merit.

=== Death and legacy ===
Smullen died aged 43 in Dublin on 15 September 2020 from a case of pancreatic cancer. He was diagnosed with the cancer in March of 2018. He ended up raising considerable funds for charity upon learning of his diagnosis where over €1 million were raised towards Cancer research in Ireland. The charity is still active today.

== Major wins ==
(Republic of Ireland) Ireland

- Flying Five Stakes – (2) – Benbaun (2006, 2007)
- Irish 1,000 Guineas – (2) – Nightime (2006), Bethrah (2010)
- Irish Derby – (2) – Grey Swallow (2004), Harzand (2016)
- Irish Oaks – (1) – Covert Love (2015)
- Irish St. Leger – (4) – Vinnie Roe (2001, 2002, 2003, 2004)
- Matron Stakes – (2) – Dress to Thrill (2002), Emulous (2011)
- Moyglare Stud Stakes – (1) – Tarascon (1997)
- National Stakes – (1) – Refuse to Bend (2002)
- Pretty Polly Stakes – (1) – Chinese White (2010)
- Tattersalls Gold Cup – (3) – Grey Swallow (2005), Casual Conquest (2009), Fascinating Rock (2016)

France

- Prix de l'Abbaye de Longchamp – (1) – Benbaun (2007)
- Prix de l'Opéra – (1) – Covert Love (2015)
- Prix Royal-Oak – (1) – Vinnie Roe (2001)

(United Kingdom) Great Britain

- Epsom Derby – (1) – Harzand (2016)
- 2,000 Guineas – (1) – Refuse to Bend (2003)
- Ascot Gold Cup – (1) – Rite of Passage (2010)
- Champion Stakes – (1) – Fascinating Rock (2015)
- Prince of Wales's Stakes – (1) – Free Eagle (2015)
- Sun Chariot Stakes – (1) – Dress to Thrill (2002)

United States

- Breeders' Cup Marathon – (1) – Muhannak (2008)
- Matriarch Stakes – (1) – Dress to Thrill (2002)
