= Wings of Desire (horse) =

British-bred Thoroughbred racehorse

- Racing silks of Lady Bamford
- Sire: Pivotal
- Grandsire: Polar Falcon
- Dam: Gull Wing
- Damsire: In the Wings
- Sex: Stallion
- Foaled: 20 February 2013
- Country: United Kingdom
- Colour: Chestnut
- Breeder: Carole Bamford
- Owner: Lady Bamford
- Trainer: John Gosden
- Record: 8: 2-1-1
- Earnings: £447,568

Major wins
- Dante Stakes (2016)

Wings of Desire (foaled 20 February 2013) is a British Thoroughbred racehorse. Unraced as a juvenile he made a considerable impact in the spring of 2016 by winning the Dante Stakes on his third appearance. He finished fourth when second favourite for the 2016 Epsom Derby. This was followed by a second place in the King George VI & Queen Elizabeth Stakes

== Background ==
Wings of Desire is a chestnut horse bred in England by his owner Carole, Lady Bamford. His sire Pivotal was a top class sprinter who won the King's Stand Stakes and the Nunthorpe Stakes in 1996. He went on to become an "excellent" sire, getting the winners of more than a thousand races across a range of distances including Sariska, Somnus, Kyllachy (Nunthorpe Stakes) and Excellent Art. Wings of Desire's dam Gull Wing won two of her fifteen races including the Listed Further Flight Stakes but, like her half-sister Sariska, was a temperamental filly who refused to race on her final appearance. She was the great-granddaughter of the Irish St. Leger winner Mountain Lodge.

Lady Bamford sent her colt into training with John Gosden at Newmarket, Suffolk.

== Racing career ==
=== 2016: three-year-old season ===
Wings of Desire did not race as a juvenile, and although he had originally been entered for The Derby he was withdrawn from the race in March 2016. He began his racing career in a maiden race over ten furlongs at Newmarket Racecourse on 13 April when he was ridden by Robert Havlin and started the 4/1 second favourite in a ten-runner field. After being restrained towards the rear of the field he made steady progress in the last quarter mile to finish third behind Winning Story and Daqeeq. Ten days later, with Havlin again in the saddle, started odds on favourite for a maiden over one and a half miles on the synthetic Tapeta surface at Wolverhampton Racecourse. After racing in mid-division he took the lead a furlong out and went clear of his rivals to win by four and a half lengths from Mahfooz.

On 12 May Wings of Desire was stepped up in class for the Group Two Dante Stakes (a major trial race for The Derby) over ten and a half furlongs at York Racecourse. With Frankie Dettori taking over from Havlin the colt started at odds of 9/1 whilst the Michael Stoute-trained Midterm (winner of the Sandown Classic Trial) was made the 5/4 favourite. The most fancied of the other ten runners were Foundation and Deauville, first and second in the Royal Lodge Stakes. Dettori restrained the colt towards the rear as the outsider Sea of Flames set a steady pace, but began to make progress early in the straight. Deauville took the lead approaching the last quarter mile but Wings of Desire produced a sustained challenge, took the lead in the closing stages and won by a neck, with Foundation a length and a half away in third. After the race Gosden commented "He's freakish. He was showing me things early on [last year] that made me think 'goodness'. He's still learning. I confess this horse never did a piece of half speed [work] until the middle of March. His two favourite activities are eating and sleeping". Following Wings of Desire's victory his odds for the Derby were cut to 4/1 even though he would have to be supplemented into the race at a cost of £75,000.

On 4 June Wings of Desire was one of sixteen colts to the Epsom Derby and was made the 6/1 second favourite behind US Army Ranger. After being restrained at the rear of the field by Dettori he was switched to the outside in the straight but was unable to reach the leaders and finished fourth behind Harzand, US Army Ranger and Idaho.

On 23 July Wings of Desire was the only three-year-old colt to take on the older horses in the King George VI and Queen Elizabeth Stakes and was installed the 4/1 3rd favourite behind Hong Kong Vase winner Highland Reel and Grand Prix de Paris winner Erupt. As the only three-year-old in the field, he was claiming 12 pounds from the rest of the field and was expected to improve from his Epsom Derby run on only his fifth start ever. Wings of Desire settled in second behind Highland Reel for most of the race and chased him down the straight but was unable to get past being beaten just over a length with the pair 3 lengths clear of Hardwicke Stakes winner Dartmouth in third.

=== 2017: four-year-old season ===
The horse did not reappear until the 2017 Hardwicke Stakes at Royal Ascot in June. Third favourite at 11/2, he finished fifth behind Idaho, although closer to him than he had been in the Derby. He was then a well-beaten fifth in the Group 2 Princess of Wales's Stakes at Newmarket, behind Hawkbill.

== Stud career ==
Wings Of Desire was sold to a South African partnership, Heversham Park Farm (Adv. Nigel Riley) & ThoroughBlood (Pty) Ltd (Fred Brons) and was cleared from quarantine in Johannesburg on Valentine's Day, 14 February 2018. He took up stud duties at Heversham Park Farm near Johannesburg.

== Pedigree ==
Pedigree of Wings of Desire (GB), chestnut colt, 2013
Sire Pivotal (GB) 1993	Polar Falcon (USA); 1987	Nureyev	Northern Dancer
Sire Pivotal (GB) 1993	Polar Falcon (USA); 1987	Nureyev	Special
Sire Pivotal (GB) 1993	Polar Falcon (USA); 1987	Marie d'Argonne	Jefferson
Sire Pivotal (GB) 1993	Polar Falcon (USA); 1987	Marie d'Argonne	Mohair
Sire Pivotal (GB) 1993	Fearless Revival (GB); 1987	Cozzene	Caro
Sire Pivotal (GB) 1993	Fearless Revival (GB); 1987	Cozzene	Ride The Trails
Sire Pivotal (GB) 1993	Fearless Revival (GB); 1987	Stufida	Bustino
Sire Pivotal (GB) 1993	Fearless Revival (GB); 1987	Stufida	Zerbinetta
Dam Gull Wing (IRE) 2004	In the Wings (GB); 1986	Sadler's Wells	Northern Dancer
Dam Gull Wing (IRE) 2004	In the Wings (GB); 1986	Sadler's Wells	Fairy Bridge
Dam Gull Wing (IRE) 2004	In the Wings (GB); 1986	High Hawk	Shirley Heights
Dam Gull Wing (IRE) 2004	In the Wings (GB); 1986	High Hawk	Sunbittern
Dam Gull Wing (IRE) 2004	Maycocks Bay (GB); 1998	Muhtarram	Alleged
Dam Gull Wing (IRE) 2004	Maycocks Bay (GB); 1998	Muhtarram	Ballet de France
Dam Gull Wing (IRE) 2004	Maycocks Bay (GB); 1998	Beacon	High Top
Dam Gull Wing (IRE) 2004	Maycocks Bay (GB); 1998	Beacon	Mountain Lodge (Family: 6-e)
