= The Gurkha =

Irish-bred Thoroughbred racehorse

- Racing silks of Derrick Smith
- Sire: Galileo
- Grandsire: Sadler's Wells
- Dam: Chintz
- Damsire: Danehill Dancer
- Sex: Colt
- Foaled: 31 March 2013
- Country: Ireland
- Colour: Bay
- Breeder: Chintz Syndicate
- Owner: Derrick Smith, Sue Magnier & Michael Tabor
- Trainer: Aidan O'Brien
- Record: 6: 3-2-1
- Earnings: £996,217

Major wins
- Poule d'Essai des Poulains (2016); Sussex Stakes (2016)

The Gurkha (foaled 31 March 2013) is an Irish Thoroughbred racehorse. Unraced as a juvenile he made a considerable impact in the spring of 2016 by winning the Poule d'Essai des Poulains on his third appearance. He went on to finish second in the St James's Palace Stakes and the Eclipse Stakes before winning the Sussex Stakes. He underwent surgery for a displaced colon in August 2016 and was retired from racing a month later.

== Background ==
The Gurkha is a bay colt with a small white star bred in Ireland by the Chintz Syndicate, a breeding company associated with the John Magnier's Coolmore Stud organisation. He was sired by Galileo, who won the Derby, Irish Derby and King George VI and Queen Elizabeth Stakes in 2001. Galileo is now one of the world's leading stallions and has been champion sire of Great Britain and Ireland five times. His other progeny include Cape Blanco, Frankel, Golden Lilac, Nathaniel, New Approach, Rip Van Winkle and Ruler of the World. The Gurkha's dam Chintz won two of her eleven races including the Group Three C L Weld Park Stakes in 2008. Her dam Gold Dodger was a half-sister of Solemia and a close relative of Authorized.

The colt was sent into training with Aidan O'Brien at Ballydoyle. Like many Coolmore horses, the official details of his ownership have changed from race to race: he has sometimes been listed as being the property of either Susan Magnier or Derrick Smith, whilst on other occasions he has been described as being the property a partnership of Smith, Magnier and Michael Tabor.

== Racing career ==
=== 2016: three-year-old season ===
The Gurkha did not race as a juvenile having undergone surgery for colic in 2015. He made his first competitive appearance in a maiden race over one mile at Leopardstown Racecourse on 6 April. Ridden by Seamie Heffernan he started at odds of 7/2 and finished third of the sixteen runners behind his stablemate Claudio Monteverdi. In a similar event at Navan Racecourse eleven days later he was partnered by Ryan Moore and started 11/8 second favourite behind the Dermot Weld-trained Aasheq. The Gurkha disputed the lead from the start before drawing away from his fifteen rivals in the last quarter mile to win "easily" by nine lengths.

On 15 May The Gurkha was moved up sharply in class when he was sent to France for the Group One Poule d'Essai des Poulains over 1600 metres, with his owners paying a supplementary fee as he had not been among the original entrants. The race was run at Deauville as the race's traditional venue, Longchamp Racecourse was being redeveloped. With Moore again in the saddle he was made the 4/1 second choice in the betting behind the Aga Khan's unbeaten Zarak whilst the other runners included Crazy Horse (Horris Hill Stakes), Birchwood (Superlative Stakes), Dicton (Prix de Fontainebleau), Attendu (Prix La Rochette) and First Selection (Solario Stakes). The Gurkha settled behind the leaders before moving forward to overtake the pace-setting First Selection 200 metres from the finish. He accelerated away from the field in the closing stages and won by five and a half lengths from First Selection who held on for second ahead of Dicton and George Patton in a three-way photo finish. After the race the colt's odds for the Epsom Derby were cut from 20/1 to 6/1 even though O'Brien declined to confirm the colt as a runner and mentioned the Prix du Jockey Club and the St James's Palace Stakes as alternative targets.

In the event, O'Brien opted to rely on US Army Ranger for Epsom and sent The Gurkha to Royal Ascot for a much anticipated clash with Galileo Gold and Awtaad in the St James's Palace Stakes on 14 June. Starting the 4/5 favourite he was restrained by Moore towards the rear of the seven-runner field he began to make progress approaching the final turn but has hampered and forced to switch to the outside in the straight. He finished strongly but was beaten one and a quarter lengths into second by Galileo Gold. On 2 July the colt was moved up in distance and matched against older horses for the first time when he contested the Eclipse Stakes over ten furlongs at Sandown Park Racecourse. He was again made odds-on favourite ahead of My Dream Boat (Prince of Wales's Stakes), Hawkbill (Tercentenary Stakes) and Time Test (Joel Stakes). After tracking the leaders he went to the front two furlongs out but came of second best in a sustained struggle with Hawkbill, finishing second by half a length. On 27 July The Gurkha faced a rematch with Galileo Gold in the Sussex Stakes at Goodwood. The other runners were Awtaad, Toormore. Ribchester (Mill Reef Stakes, Jersey Stakes), Kodi Bear (Celebration Mile), Richard Pankhurst (Chesham Stakes), So Beloved (Supreme Stakes), Gabrial (Lincoln Handicap) and Lightning Spear (third in the Queen Anne Stakes). After chasing the leader Galileo Gold he was boxed in entering the straight before switching left to deliver his challenge. He overtook Galileo Gold inside the final furlong and won by a neck, with Ribchester a short head away in third place.

On 12 August The Gurkha underwent surgery for a displaced colon. It was announced that he would not race again in 2016. Although he was reported to have recovered well from the surgery his retirement from racing was announced on 21 September. Aidan O'Brien commented "From day one he showed us he was a top-class colt. He was always a beautiful mover and physically he was a great shape... He was a top-class Galileo with loads of speed. He was a magnificent specimen and a very courageous horse".

== Pedigree ==
Pedigree of The Gurkha (IRE), bay colt, 2013
Sire Galileo (IRE) 1998	Sadler's Wells (USA); 1981	Northern Dancer	Nearctic
Sire Galileo (IRE) 1998	Sadler's Wells (USA); 1981	Northern Dancer	Natalma
Sire Galileo (IRE) 1998	Sadler's Wells (USA); 1981	Fairy Bridge	Bold Reason
Sire Galileo (IRE) 1998	Sadler's Wells (USA); 1981	Fairy Bridge	Special
Sire Galileo (IRE) 1998	Urban Sea (USA) ch. 1989	Miswaki	Mr. Prospector
Sire Galileo (IRE) 1998	Urban Sea (USA) ch. 1989	Miswaki	Hopespringseternal
Sire Galileo (IRE) 1998	Urban Sea (USA) ch. 1989	Allegretta	Lombard
Sire Galileo (IRE) 1998	Urban Sea (USA) ch. 1989	Allegretta	Anatevka
Dam Chintz (IRE) 2006	Danehill Dancer (IRE); 1993	Danehill	Danzig
Dam Chintz (IRE) 2006	Danehill Dancer (IRE); 1993	Danehill	Razyana
Dam Chintz (IRE) 2006	Danehill Dancer (IRE); 1993	Mira Adonde	Sharpen Up
Dam Chintz (IRE) 2006	Danehill Dancer (IRE); 1993	Mira Adonde	Lettre d'Amour
Dam Chintz (IRE) 2006	Gold Dodger (USA); 1994	Slew o' Gold	Seattle Slew
Dam Chintz (IRE) 2006	Gold Dodger (USA); 1994	Slew o' Gold	Alluvial
Dam Chintz (IRE) 2006	Gold Dodger (USA); 1994	Brooklyn's Dance	Shirley Heights
Dam Chintz (IRE) 2006	Gold Dodger (USA); 1994	Brooklyn's Dance	Vallee Dansante (Family 16-c)
