= Harzand (horse) =

Irish-bred Thoroughbred racehorse

- Racing silks of Aga Khan IV
- Sire: Sea The Stars
- Grandsire: Cape Cross
- Dam: Hazariya
- Damsire: Xaar
- Sex: Stallion
- Foaled: 6 March 2013
- Colour: Bay
- Breeder: Aga Khan IV
- Owner: Aga Khan IV
- Trainer: Dermot Weld
- Record: 7: 4–0–0
- Earnings: £1,535,850

Major wins
- Ballysax Stakes (2016); Epsom Derby (2016); Irish Derby (2016)

Harzand (foaled 6 March 2013) is an Irish Thoroughbred racehorse who won the 2016 Epsom Derby. He showed some promise when finishing fifth in his only race as a two-year-old in 2015. In the spring of 2016 he won a maiden race by sixteen lengths and then established himself as a potential top-class performer with a win in the Group Three Ballysax Stakes. On 4 June 2016, despite doubt about his suitability for the race and a late injury scare, he defeated fifteen opponents to win the 237th running of The Derby. Three weeks later he won the Irish Derby at the Curragh but he was beaten in two subsequent races and was retired from racing at the end of the season.

== Background ==
Harzand is a brown horse with no white markings bred in Ireland by his owner the Aga Khan. He is from the third crop of foals sired by Sea The Stars who won the 2000 Guineas, Epsom Derby and Prix de l'Arc de Triomphe in 2009. His other major winners have included Taghrooda and Sea The Moon. Harzand's dam Hazariya was a high class racemare whose wins included the Athasi Stakes in 2005. She is a granddaughter of Hazy Idea, the dam of Hittite Glory, making her a close relative of Never Bend and Hethersett. Throughout his racing career, Harzand was trained at the Curragh by Dermot Weld and was ridden in all of his races by Pat Smullen. He usually races in a sheepskin noseband.

== Racing career ==
=== 2015: two-year-old season ===
Harzand made his racecourse debut in a maiden race over one mile at Gowran Park on 20 September 2015. Starting the 11/4 second favourite in a sixteen-runner field started slowly before making steady progress in the closing stages and finishing fifth behind the Johnny Murtagh-trained Newsman.

=== 2016: three-year-old season ===
==== Spring ====
On his three-year-old debut, Harzand started the 4/9 favourite for the Blackwater Maiden over ten furlongs at Cork Racecourse on 26 March. He took the lead two furlongs from the finish and won "easily" by sixteen lengths from the Aidan O'Brien-trained Sword Fighter (later to win the Queen's Vase). On 10 April, Harzand was stepped up in class for the Group Three Ballysax Stakes on heavy ground at Leopardstown Racecourse. He was made the 2/1 favourite in a field of seven colts which included the Jim Bolger-trained Moonlight Magic and a three-horse O'Brien entry comprising Cook Islands, Idaho and Beacon Rock. After chasing the leaders in the early stages he moved up on the outside approaching the final furlong, overtook Idaho 100 metres from the finish and won by 1 1/4 lengths with a gap of 7 1/2 lengths back to Beacon Rock in third. He showed a lot of quality there. I was caught for a little bit of speed early on and had to sit and suffer, but when I met the rising ground I never had any doubt I'd get to the horse in front as he stays very well. I think he is too big and heavy to go round Epsom, maybe the Irish Derby but I think he has all the qualities for the Leger at Doncaster. The mile and six at Doncaster would be ideal." The form of the race was subsequently boosted when the fifth placed Moonlight Magic won the Derrinstown Stud Derby Trial.

==== Summer ====
On 4 June, Harzand was one of sixteen colts to contest the 237th running of the Epsom Derby. His participation had been in doubt until shortly before the race as he had dislodged a shoe when being shipped from Ireland and had to spend some time with his affected foot in a bucket of ice. Weld later commented "It was pretty chaotic. He looked pretty unlikely to run. His foot was very sore. My staff poulticed it for the journey over and iced it for four hours. We then got hold of Jim Bolger’s vet, Jim Reilly, who was able to tack the shoe back on. He tapped it on very delicately and then we put it in ice again". Harzand was made the 13/2 third favourite behind US Army Ranger and Wings of Desire in a sixteen-runner field which also included Cloth of Stars, Idaho, Moonlight Magic, Humphrey Bogart (Lingfield Derby Trial) and Algometer (Cocked Hat Stakes). Harzand was held up by Smullen in the early stages and turned into the straight in eighth place behind the pacemaking Port Douglas. He began to make steady progress and moved into second place behind Idaho approaching the last quarter mile before taking the lead a furlong from the finish. He was strongly challenged by US Army Ranger in the closing stages but stayed on strongly to pull ahead again and win by 1 1/2 lengths.

Smullen, who was winning the race first time commented "I spotted the white face of US Army Ranger, but this horse responded to me. The trouble we had with him this morning, I didn't know if he would get here, but it's a great team effort. I'm delighted for them." The Aga Khan was winning the race for the fifth time, equaling the record of his grandfather Aga Khan III. After the race he said "Winning the Derby is the goal of every owner and it’s been the goal of every owner for centuries. We are not in the marketplace for horses. We breed them. All the effort begins before the horses are even bred because you are looking at the matings. Then you breed, you raise, you run and then you take them back to the stud if they are good enough". Weld said "I always wanted to win it, possibly never had a horse good enough". On the following day he praised the colt's "toughness and courage" and identified the Irish Derby and the St Leger as possible targets.

Three weeks after his win at Epsom Harzand returned to Ireland for the Irish Derby at the Curragh on 25 June. Idaho, Red Verdon, Moonlight Magic, Port Douglas and Shogun were again in opposition but Harzand was made the 4/6 favourite in a nine-runner field. Smullen settled the colt in third place before moving up on the outside to take the lead 2 1/2 furlongs from the finish. He overcame a sustained challenge from Idaho to win by half a length. After the race Weld said "A lot of people thought Harzand didn't have speed but he showed today that he had. He's a proper horse and the first two picked up and really quickened. Pat gave him a great ride. It's been a very special day. The horse will have a good break now and will be aimed at the Arc".

==== Autumn ====
Harzand returned on 10 September for the Irish Champion Stakes in which he was dropped in distance to ten furlongs and was matched against older horses. He started 2/1 favourite but after tacking the leaders he began to struggle three furlongs out and finished eighth behind the French colt Almanzor. A veterinary examination revealed that he had been "struck into" during the races, sustaining a minor injury to one of his hind legs. The colt recovered sufficiently to contest the Prix de l'Arc de Triomphe at Chantilly Racecourse on 2 October and started third favourite behind Postponed and Makahiki. Ridden as usual by Smullen he never looked likely to win and finished ninth of the sixteen runners behind Found.

Three weeks after his run at Longchamp, it was announced that Harzand had been retired from racing and would begin his career as a breeding stallion at the Aga Khan's Gilltown Stud in 2017.

== Pedigree ==
Pedigree of Harzand (IRE), brown colt, 2013
Sire Sea The Stars (IRE) 2006	Cape Cross (IRE); 1994	Green Desert	Danzig
Sire Sea The Stars (IRE) 2006	Cape Cross (IRE); 1994	Green Desert	Foreign Courier
Sire Sea The Stars (IRE) 2006	Cape Cross (IRE); 1994	Park Appeal	Ahonoora
Sire Sea The Stars (IRE) 2006	Cape Cross (IRE); 1994	Park Appeal	Balidaress
Sire Sea The Stars (IRE) 2006	Urban Sea (USA); 1989	Miswaki	Mr. Prospector
Sire Sea The Stars (IRE) 2006	Urban Sea (USA); 1989	Miswaki	Hopespringseternal
Sire Sea The Stars (IRE) 2006	Urban Sea (USA); 1989	Allegretta	Lombard
Sire Sea The Stars (IRE) 2006	Urban Sea (USA); 1989	Allegretta	Anatevka
Dam Hazariya (IRE) 2002	Xaar (GB); 1995	Zafonic	Gone West
Dam Hazariya (IRE) 2002	Xaar (GB); 1995	Zafonic	Zaizafon
Dam Hazariya (IRE) 2002	Xaar (GB); 1995	Monroe	Sir Ivor
Dam Hazariya (IRE) 2002	Xaar (GB); 1995	Monroe	Best In Show
Dam Hazariya (IRE) 2002	Hazaradjat (IRE); 1989	Darshaan	Shirley Heights
Dam Hazariya (IRE) 2002	Hazaradjat (IRE); 1989	Darshaan	Delsy
Dam Hazariya (IRE) 2002	Hazaradjat (IRE); 1989	Hazy Idea	Hethersett
Dam Hazariya (IRE) 2002	Hazaradjat (IRE); 1989	Hazy Idea	Won't Linger (Family 21-a)
