= Galileo (horse) =

Irish-bred Thoroughbred racehorse

- Sire: Sadler's Wells
- Grandsire: Northern Dancer
- Dam: Urban Sea
- Damsire: Miswaki
- Sex: Stallion
- Foaled: 30 March 1998
- Died: 10 July 2021 (aged 23)
- Country: Ireland
- Colour: Bay
- Breeder: David Tsui and Orpendale
- Owner: Sue Magnier, Michael Tabor
- Racing colours
- Trainer: Aidan O'Brien
- Record: 8: 6-1-0
- Earnings: £1,621,110

Major wins
- Ballysax Stakes (2001); Derrinstown Stud Derby Trial (2001); Epsom Derby (2001); Irish Derby (2001); King George VI and Queen Elizabeth Stakes (2001)

Awards
- European Champion Three-Year-Old Colt (2001); Leading sire in Great Britain & Ireland (2008, 2010—2020); Leading broodmare sire in Great Britain & Ireland (2020, 2021); British Champions Series Hall of Fame (2022); Timeform rating: 134
- Last updated on 21 July 2021

Galileo (30 March 1998 – 10 July 2021) was an Irish Thoroughbred racehorse and sire. In a racing career which lasted from October 2000 until October 2001, he won six of the eight races he ran. He is best known for having won the Derby, Irish Derby and King George VI and Queen Elizabeth Stakes in 2001. He was named the European Champion Three-Year-Old Colt of 2001.

After his retirement, Galileo was one of the most sought-after sires in the world. He first became the leading sire in Great Britain and Ireland in 2008, then consecutively earned the title from 2010 to 2020. In 2020, he set the record for the number of Epsom Derby winners sired at five: New Approach, Ruler of the World, Australia, Anthony Van Dyck and Serpentine. In June 2020, Galileo sired his 85th Group 1 winner, breaking Danehill's world record and becoming the most successful source of Group 1 winners in thoroughbred history with his current standing of over 100 Group 1 winners, making him the most successful sire in thoroughbred history. In addition to his Derby winners, his notable offspring include Frankel, Nathaniel, Found, Churchill, Minding, and Kyprios. He was also a leading broodmare sire, most notably of Rhododendron.

Galileo was euthanized on 10 July 2021, after a debilitating injury to his left foreleg which failed to heal after surgery earlier that year.

== Background ==
Galileo was a 16^{1}/_{2} hh (64.5 inches, 164 cm) bay horse with a narrow white blaze and a white sock on his left hind leg. He was sired by Sadler's Wells out of the mare Urban Sea. His breeders were David Tsui, the owner of Urban Sea, and "Orpendale", a name used by the Coolmore Stud organisation for some of their breeding interests. He was described as a three-year-old as being "one of the most impeccably bred horses in training".

Sadler's Wells won three Group One races in 1984 and went on to sire the winners of over 2,000 races, including more than 130 at Group One/Grade I level. He was the most successful sire in the history of British racing, being the leading sire in Great Britain and Ireland a record 14 times. Urban Sea won the Prix de l'Arc de Triomphe in 1993 and went on to become an outstanding broodmare. Apart from Galileo, she was the dam of the Derby winner Sea the Stars and the Grade I winners Black Sam Bellamy (Tattersalls Gold Cup) and My Typhoon (Diana Stakes), as well as All Too Beautiful (Group race winner, Group One placed) and Melikah (Listed race winner, Group One placed).

Owned by Sue Magnier and Michael Tabor, Galileo was sent into training with Aidan O'Brien, then just starting his tenure at Ballydoyle. Galileo was ridden in all but one of his races by Michael Kinane.

Galileo was known for his relaxed behaviour and even temperament. Noel Stapleton, his long-time handler at Coolmore Stud, called him a creature of habit: "He is a true gentleman, and I think he knows how important he is." O'Brien noted that Galileo "prowled" when asked to walk: "Most horses when you ask them to go forward, up goes the head and they walk up, but he used to walk forward and walk out. His walking stride was so long and there was so much power from his front and back."

He was one of several horses to have borne the name of Galileo. The most notable "other" Galileo was a Polish-bred gelding which won the Grade I RSA Novices' Hurdle at the 2002 Cheltenham Festival.

== Racing career ==
=== 2000: two-year-old career ===
Galileo's two-year-old debut was delayed by a cough that he developed over the summer of 2000. He did not appear on the racecourse until 28 October, in a sixteen-runner maiden race at Leopardstown. He was made the even-money favourite, despite the field containing two runners each from the stables of the leading Irish trainers John Oxx and Jim Bolger. Kinane tracked the leaders before sending the colt into the lead in the straight and extending his lead to fourteen lengths by the finish.

=== 2001: three-year-old career ===
==== Spring ====
Galileo was conditioned for a middle-distance campaign and aimed at Derby trial races in late spring. On his debut, he was 1/3 favourite for the Listed Ballysax Stakes over a mile and a quarter at Leopardstown, which he won "easily" by three and a half lengths. Runner-up Milan went on to win the St Leger and finish second in the Breeders' Cup Turf, while the third-placed Vinnie Roe won four consecutive Irish St. Legers. O'Brien was satisfied with the performance, especially as he believed the colt was some way from peak fitness: ("[my horses]... are as big as bulls") and likely to improve.

Galileo was stepped up in class for the Group Three Derrinstown Stud Derby Trial at Leopardstown in May. The odds-on favourite, he was ridden for the first and only time by Seamie Heffernan, as Kinane was riding Milan in the Group One Prix Lupin on the same day. Galileo beat the John Oxx-trained Exaltation by one and a half lengths. Although Heffernan put Galileo under pressure before going clear, the colt's Derby odds were cut from 8–1 to 5–1.

==== Summer ====
At Epsom, Galileo started 11/4 joint-favourite with 2,000 Guineas winner Golan. The 2001 Epsom Derby field was strong, with Tobougg, the previous year's champion two-year-old, and the winners of most of the major Derby trials, including Mr Combustible (Chester Vase), Dilshaan (Dante Stakes) and Perfect Sunday (Lingfield Derby Trial), all taking part. Two furlongs from the finish, Galileo moved past Mr Combustible and quickly went clear to record an "impressive" three and a half length victory over Golan, Tobougg and Mr Combustible. Following the race, Timeform assigned a figure of 130 to Galileo, making him, in their opinion, the best Derby winner for ten years. Kinane was reported to have called Galileo the best horse he had ridden: "There is no weakness to him... He is a dream to ride." It was the first Derby winner for O'Brien and the first Derby winner Sadler's Wells had sired.

In the Irish Derby at The Curragh, three weeks later, Galileo was 4/11 favourite, with Golan and Exaltation the only other horses starting at less than 20/1. Although eased down in the closing stages, the colt won by four lengths from the Derby Italiano winner Morshdi, with Golan another four lengths back in third. Kinane, who was winning his first Irish Derby in seventeen attempts, said that he was always in "complete control", while Morshdi's jockey, Philip Robinson, described the winner as "a freak".

Galileo was then tested against older horses in the King George VI and Queen Elizabeth Diamond Stakes at Ascot in July. The betting suggested a match between Galileo (1/2 favourite) and the Godolphin five-year-old Fantastic Light (7–2), who had won Group One races in four different countries. Such were the reputations of these two horses that the third choice in the betting, the French Derby winner Anabaa Blue, started at 18/1. Kinane took Galileo to the lead two furlongs out, but Frankie Dettori challenged hard on Fantastic Light as Galileo won by two lengths.

==== Autumn ====
Galileo returned to Leopardstown in September for a much-anticipated Irish Champion Stakes against Fantastic Light again, this time over the shorter distance of one and a quarter miles. O'Brien's Ice Dancer was to act as pacemaker and ensure a stamina test. The plan failed, as the rest of the riders ignored Ice Dancer, who went ten lengths clear before stopping abruptly in the straight. Fantastic Light and Galileo raced side by side, with the former winning by a head. The race has been described as one of the most exciting and memorable in the modern history of the sport. O'Brien praised the winner but felt that he himself had "messed up" tactically.

For his final race, Galileo was sent to Belmont Park for the Breeders' Cup Classic. He would be racing on dirt for the first time, although he was prepared by exercising on the artificial surface at Southwell. In the Classic, Galileo finished sixth of the fourteen runners behind Tiznow.

"With the benefit of hindsight", O'Brien later recalled, "it was an unrealistic target to ask him to do that after having such a tough season and racing against the older horses, but it was the belief that was in him, the belief that everyone had in him, that we thought it could be possible that it could happen. I remember when he came in, he was after trying so hard he was almost crying. He was so genuine."

Galileo's retirement was announced immediately after the race.

== Race record ==
Date	Race	Dist (f)	Course	Class	Prize (£K)	Odds	Runners	Placing	Margin	Time	Jockey	Trainer
28 October 2000	IBEC EBF Maiden	8	Leopardstown	M	8	Evens	16	1	14	1:48.20	Michael Kinane	Aidan O'Brien
16 April 2001	Ballysax Stakes	10	Leopardstown	L	20	1/3	7	1	3.5	2:20.10	Michael Kinane	Aidan O'Brien
13 May 2001	Derrinstown Stud Derby Trial	10	Leopardstown	3	39	8/15	5	1	1.5	2:08.50	Seamie Heffernan	Aidan O'Brien
9 June 2001	Derby	12	Epsom	1	580	11/4	12	1	3.5	2:33.27	Michael Kinane	Aidan O'Brien
1 July 2001	Irish Derby	12	The Curragh	1	411	4/11	12	1	4	2:27.10	Michael Kinane	Aidan O'Brien
28 July 2001	King George VI & Queen Elizabeth Stakes	12	Ascot	1	435	1/2	12	1	2	2:27.71	Michael Kinane	Aidan O'Brien
8 September 2001	Irish Champion Stakes	10	Leopardstown	1	384	4/11	7	2	Head	2:01.80	Michael Kinane	Aidan O'Brien
27 October 2001	Breeders' Cup Classic	10	Belmont Park	1	1386	100/30	13	6	7.75	2:00.62	Michael Kinane	Aidan O'Brien

== Assessment ==
Galileo was named European Champion Three-Year-Old at the Cartier Racing Awards.

In the 2001 International Classification (the forerunner of the World Thoroughbred Racehorse Rankings), Galileo was assessed at 129 (equal with Fantastic Light), making him the third highest rated horse behind Sakhee and Point Given.

Galileo was given a final Timeform rating of 134.

== Stud career ==
Galileo was retired to stand as a stallion for the Coolmore Stud. He originally operated as a "shuttle" stallion, standing at Coolmore's main farm at Fethard, County Tipperary Ireland during the Northern Hemisphere breeding season and moving to its Australian branch in the Hunter Valley, New South Wales for the Southern Hemisphere breeding season. However, from 2006, he stood exclusively in Ireland.

Galileo earned his first title as the leading sire in Great Britain and Ireland in 2008 thanks to his first Derby winner New Approach. He regained the title in 2010 when Frankel made his debut, and repeated in 2011 through 2020 inclusive. Since 2008, his stud fee was privately negotiated, but in 2018 he was reputed to be the most expensive stallion in the world. For breeders who were not associates of Coolmore Stud, the fee had "long been north of €400,000" and was suggested to be as high as €600,000. At the height of his stud career, Galileo generated an estimated €40 million per year in stud fees for Coolmore.

At the time of his death on 10 July 2021, he had sired 338 stakes winners, 228 of which were group winners. In August 2018, Sizzling gave Galileo his 328th European group race win as a sire, taking him past the record previously held by his own sire Sadler's Wells.

On 9 November 2019, Magic Wand became his 84th individual Group/Grade One winner, putting him level with Danehill for the most such winners sired. He broke this record when Peaceful won the Irish 1000 Guineas in June 2020. On the same day he died, Bolshoi Ballet became his 92nd G1 winner. In 2022, Magical Lagoon became his 95th G1 winner by taking the Irish Oaks. Proud and Regal is 97th G1 winner of it

In 2019, Anthony Van Dyck became his fourth Epsom Derby winner (with New Approach, Ruler of the World, and Australia). This tied him with Cyllene, Waxy, Sir Peter Teazle, Blandford and Montjeu for the number of Derby winners sired. He broke this record when Serpentine won the Derby in 2020. After Minding's victory in the 2016 1000 Guineas, Galileo had become the sire of winners of all five British Classics. In the 2016 Prix de l'Arc de Triomphe, he sired the top three finishers (Found, Highland Reel and Order of St George). In the 2019 Derby, he was the sire, grandsire or great-grandsire of all runners but Sir Dragonet, who was related to Urban Sea through his full sister All Too Beautiful. In 2020, he was the sire of the Love, winner of the 1000 Guineas, Epsom Oaks and the Darley Yorkshire Oaks.

In September 2008, Galileo underwent surgery for colic.

In early 2021, Galileo injured his left forefoot and underwent another surgery. He failed to respond to treatment and was euthanized on 10 July. When announcing the death, John Magnier of Coolmore commented, ""The effect he is having on the breed through his sons and daughters will be a lasting legacy, and his phenomenal success really is unprecedented."

O'Brien noted that as a sire Galileo was notable for passing his own determination down to his offspring. "You would train a lot of horses," he said, "different types of horses who all have different traits, but very few of them, in fact none of them, put that mental trait into their horses the way Galileo did. What he put into their minds, that genuineness, was out of this world."

=== Notable progeny ===
c = colt, f = filly, g = gelding

Foaled	Name	Sex	Major wins
2003	Allegretto	f	Prix Royal-Oak
2003	Nightime	f	Irish 1,000 Guineas
2003	Red Rocks	c	Breeders' Cup Turf, Man o' War Stakes
2003	Sixties Icon	c	St Leger Stakes
2004	Celestial Halo	g	Triumph Hurdle
2004	Mahler	c	Queen's Vase
2004	Niwot	c	Sydney Cup
2004	Soldier of Fortune	c	Irish Derby, Coronation Cup
2004	Teofilo	c	National Stakes, Dewhurst Stakes
2005	Alandi	c	Irish St. Leger, Prix du Cadran
2005	Cima De Triomphe	c	Derby Italiano
2005	Lush Lashes	f	Coronation Stakes, Yorkshire Oaks, Matron Stakes
2005	New Approach	c	National Stakes, Dewhurst Stakes, Epsom Derby, Irish Champion Stakes, Champion Stakes
2005	Sousa	c	Spring Champion Stakes
2006	Altano	g	Prix du Cadran
2006	Linton	g	Stradbroke Handicap
2006	Rip Van Winkle	c	Sussex Stakes, Queen Elizabeth II Stakes, International Stakes
2006	Sans Frontieres	c	Irish St. Leger
2007	Cape Blanco	c	Irish Derby, Irish Champion Stakes, Man o' War Stakes, Arlington Million, Joe Hirsch Turf Classic Invitational Stakes
2007	Igugu	f	South African Fillies Classic, Woolavington 2000,Durban July Handicap, Cape Metropolitan Stakes
2007	Lily Of The Valley	f	Prix de l'Opéra
2007	Mahbooba	f	Clairwood Golden Slipper
2008	Frankel	c	Dewhurst Stakes, 2000 Guineas, St James's Palace Stakes, Sussex Stakes Queen Elizabeth II Stakes, Lockinge Stakes, Queen Anne Stakes, International Stakes, Champion Stakes
2008	Galikova	f	Prix Vermeille
2008	Golden Lilac	f	Poule d'Essai des Pouliches, Prix de Diane, Prix d'Ispahan
2008	Misty for Me	f	Moyglare Stud Stakes, Prix Marcel Boussac, Irish 1,000 Guineas, Pretty Polly Stakes
2008	Nathaniel	c	King George VI and Queen Elizabeth Stakes, Eclipse Stakes
2008	Roderic O'Connor	c	Critérium International, Irish 2,000 Guineas
2008	Seville	c	The Metropolitan
2008	Together	f	Queen Elizabeth II Challenge Cup
2008	Treasure Beach	c	Irish Derby, Secretariat Stakes
2009	Great Heavens	f	Irish Oaks
2009	Imperial Monarch	c	Grand Prix de Paris
2009	Maybe	f	Moyglare Stud Stakes
2009	Noble Mission	c	Tattersalls Gold Cup, Grand Prix de Saint-Cloud †, Champion Stakes
2009	Romantica	f	Prix Jean Romanet
2009	Was	f	Epsom Oaks
2009	Windsor Park	g	Baring Bingham Novices' Hurdle
2010	Foundry	g	The Metropolitan
2010	Galileo Rock	c	
2010	Intello	c	Prix du Jockey Club
2010	Kingsbarns	c	Racing Post Trophy
2010	Magician	c	Irish 2,000 Guineas, Breeders' Cup Turf
2010	Mondialiste	c	Woodbine Mile, Arlington Million
2010	Ruler of the World	c	Epsom Derby
2010	Telescope	c	Great Voltigeur Stakes, Hardwicke Stakes, Aston Park Stakes
2010	The United States	c	Ranvet Stakes
2011	Rhett Butler	c	Serbian Horse of the year
2011	Adelaide	c	Secretariat Stakes, Cox Plate
2011	Australia	c	Epsom Derby, Irish Derby, International Stakes
2011	Marvellous	f	Irish 1,000 Guineas
2011	Photo Call	f	Rodeo Drive Stakes, First Lady Stakes
2011	Tapestry	f	Yorkshire Oaks
2012	Bondi Beach	c	Curragh Cup, Vintage Crop Stakes
2012	Curvy	f	E.P. Taylor Stakes
2012	Decorated Knight	c	Jabel Hatta, Tattersalls Gold Cup, Irish Champion Stakes
2012	Found	f	Prix Marcel Boussac, Breeders' Cup Turf, Prix de l'Arc de Triomphe
2012	Gleneagles ‡	c	Vincent O'Brien Stakes, 2000 Guineas Stakes, Irish 2,000 Guineas, St James's Palace Stakes
2012	Highland Reel	c	Secretariat Stakes, Hong Kong Vase (twice), King George VI and Queen Elizabeth Stakes, Breeders' Cup Turf, Coronation Cup, Prince of Wales's Stakes
2012	Order of St George	c	Irish St. Leger (twice), Ascot Gold Cup
2012	Together Forever	f	Fillies' Mile
2013	Alice Springs	f	Falmouth Stakes, Matron Stakes, Sun Chariot Stakes
2013	Ballydoyle	f	Prix Marcel Boussac
2013	Deauville	c	Belmont Derby
2013	Idaho	c	Great Voltigeur Stakes, Hardwicke Stakes, Ormonde Stakes
2013	Johannes Vermeer	c	Critérium International
2013	Minding	f	Moyglare Stud Stakes, Fillies' Mile, 1000 Guineas, Epsom Oaks, Pretty Polly Stakes, Nassau Stakes, Queen Elizabeth II Stakes
2013	Seventh Heaven	f	Irish Oaks, Yorkshire Oaks
2013	The Gurkha	c	Poule d'Essai des Poulains, Sussex Stakes
2013	Ulysses	c	Eclipse Stakes, International Stakes
2013	US Army Ranger	g	Chester Vase
2014	Capri	c	Irish Derby, St Leger
2014	Churchill	c	National Stakes, Dewhurst Stakes, 2000 Guineas, Irish 2,000 Guineas
2014	Cliffs of Moher	c	Dee Stakes, Mooresbridge Stakes
2014	Hydrangea	f	Matron Stakes, British Champions Fillies & Mares Stakes
2014	Rhododendron	f	Fillies' Mile, Prix de l'Opéra, Lockinge Stakes
2014	Winter	f	1000 Guineas, Irish 1,000 Guineas, Coronation Stakes, Nassau Stakes
2014	Waldgeist	c	Critérium de Saint-Cloud, Grand Prix de Saint-Cloud, Prix Ganay, Prix de l'Arc de Triomphe
2015	Clemmie	f	Cheveley Park Stakes
2015	Flag of Honour	c	Irish St. Leger
2015	Forever Together	f	Epsom Oaks
2015	Happily	f	Moyglare Stud Stakes, Prix Jean-Luc Lagardère
2015	Kew Gardens	c	Grand Prix de Paris, St Leger
2015	Magical	f	British Champions Fillies & Mares Stakes, Tattersalls Gold Cup, Irish Champion Stakes, Champion Stakes, Pretty Polly Stakes
2015	Magic Wand	f	Mackinnon Stakes
2016	Line of Duty	c	Breeders' Cup Juvenile Turf
2016	Hermosa	f	1000 Guineas, Irish 1000 Guineas
2016	Anthony Van Dyck	c	Epsom Derby
2016	Cape of Good Hope	c	Caulfield Stakes
2016	Circus Maximus	c	St James's Palace Stakes, Prix du Moulin de Longchamp, Queen Anne Stakes
2016	Sovereign	c	Irish Derby
2016	Japan	c	Grand Prix de Paris, International Stakes
2016	Search For A Song	f	Irish St. Leger (twice)
2017	Love	f	Moyglare Stud Stakes, 1000 Guineas, Epsom Oaks, Yorkshire Oaks, Prince of Wales's Stakes
2017	Magic Attitude	f	Belmont Oaks
2017	Mogul	c	Grand Prix de Paris, Hong Kong Vase
2017	Peaceful	f	Irish 1,000 Guineas
2017	Russian Emperor	g	Hong Kong Gold Cup, Hong Kong Champions & Chater Cup (twice)
2017	Serpentine	g	Epsom Derby
2018	Bolshoi Ballet	c	Belmont Derby, Sword Dancer Stakes
2018	Empress Josephine	f	Irish 1,000 Guineas
2018	Joan of Arc	f	Prix de Diane
2018	Kyprios	c	Ascot Gold Cup (twice), Goodwood Cup (twice), Irish St. Leger (twice), Prix du Cadran (twice)
2018	Shale	f	Moyglare Stud Stakes
2019	Changingoftheguard	g	Sydney Cup
2019	Magical Lagoon	f	Irish Oaks
2019	Tuesday	f	Epsom Oaks, Breeders' Cup Filly & Mare Turf
2020	Land Legend	g	The Metropolitan , Might And Power Stakes
2020	Proud And Regal	c	Critérium International
2020	Queenstown	g	Prix Royal-Oak
2020	Savethelastdance	f	Irish Oaks
2020	Warm Heart	f	Yorkshire Oaks, Prix Vermeille, Pegasus World Cup Turf Invitational
2021	Content	f	Yorkshire Oaks
2021	Grateful	f	Prix de Royallieu
2021	Jan Brueghel	c	St Leger Stakes, Coronation Cup

† Noble Mission was awarded the Grand Prix de Saint-Cloud, after another Galileo son called Spiritjim was demoted from first after it was found that he tested positive for banned substances.

‡ Gleneagles was demoted from first to third in the 2014 Prix Jean-Luc Lagardère, after stewards deemed him to have interfered with the horse that finished second (Full Mast) and third (Territories).

=== Sire of sires ===
At the time of his death in 2021, Galileo had sired 20 sons who themselves became sires of Group/Grade 1 winners. Of these sons, Teofilio had sired the most G1 winners with 20, while Frankel was leading the sire list after having sired his first Derby winner. Both Australia and Gleneagles were in the top 20 of leading sires despite having just a few foal crops to represent them. In 2018, Frankel had finished fourth on the leading sire list, while Nathaniel finished fifth. New Approach was the sire of 2018 Derby winner Masar, while Teofilo sired Melbourne Cup winner Cross Counter.

==== Teofilo ====
Entered stud in 2008.

Foaled	Name	Sex	Major wins
2009	Parish Hall	c	Dewhurst Stakes
2009	Voleuse de Coeurs	f	Irish St. Leger
2010	Havanna Gold	c	Prix Jean Prat
2010	Loch Garman	c	Critérium International
2010	Sonntag	g	Queensland Derby
2010	Trading Leather	c	Irish Derby
2010	Happy Clapper	g	Canterbury Stakes, Doncaster Mile, Epsom Handicap
2011	Kermadec	c	Doncaster Mile
2012	Pleascach	f	Irish 1,000 Guineas, Yorkshire Oaks
2012	Humidor (NZ)	g	Australian Cup, Makybe Diva Stakes, Memsie Stakes,
2013	Twilight Payment	g	Melbourne Cup
2014	Exultant	g	Hong Kong Vase, Hong Kong Gold Cup, Hong Kong Champions & Chater Cup, Queen Elizabeth II Cup
2015	Gear Up	c	Criterium de Saint-Cloud
2015	Cross Counter	g	Melbourne Cup
2016	Donjah	f	Preis von Europa
2017	Subjectivist	c	Ascot Gold Cup
2017	Tawkeel	f	Prix Saint Alary
2017	Without A Fight	g	Caulfield Cup, Melbourne Cup

==== New Approach ====
Entered stud in 2009.

Foaled	Name	Sex	Major wins
2010	Dawn Approach	c	National Stakes, Dewhurst Stakes, 2000 Guineas, St James's Palace Stakes
2010	May's Dream	f	Australasian Oaks
2010	Sultanina	f	Nassau Stakes
2010	Talent	f	Epsom Oaks
2011	Elliptique	c	Grosser Dallmayr-Preis
2011	Potemkin	g	Premio Roma
2015	Cascadian	g	Doncaster Handicap
2015	Masar	c	Epsom Derby
2018	Mac Swiney	c	Vertem Futurity Trophy, Irish 2,000 Guineas

==== Frankel ====
Entered stud in 2013.

Foaled	Name	Sex	Major wins
2014	Soul Stirring	f	Yushun Himba, Hanshin Juvenile Fillies
2014	Cracksman	c	Champion Stakes (twice), Prix Ganay, Coronation Cup
2014	Mozu Ascot	c	Yasuda Kinen, February Stakes
2014	Call The Wind	g	Prix du Cadran
2014	Dream Castle	g	Jebel Hatta
2014	Mirage Dancer	c	The Metropolitan (ATC)
2015	Without Parole	c	St James's Palace Stakes
2015	Veracious	f	Falmouth Stakes
2016	Anapurna	f	Epsom Oaks, Prix de Royallieu
2016	Logician	c	St Leger
2017	Alpinista	f	Grosser Preis von Berlin, Preis von Europa, Grosser Preis von Bayern, Grand Prix de Saint-Cloud, Yorkshire Oaks, Prix de l'Arc de Triomphe
2017	Hungry Heart	f	Australian Oaks, Vinery Stud Stakes
2017	Quadrilateral	f	Fillies' Mile
2018	Adayar	c	Epsom Derby, King George VI and Queen Elizabeth Stakes
2018	Converge	g	TJ Smith Stakes
2018	Grenadier Guards	c	Asahi Hai Futurity Stakes
2018	Hurricane Lane	c	Irish Derby

==== Nathaniel ====
Entered stud in 2013.

Foaled	Name	Sex	Major wins
2014	Enable	f	Epsom Oaks, Irish Oaks, King George VI and Queen Elizabeth Stakes (three times), Yorkshire Oaks (twice), Prix de l'Arc de Triomphe (twice), Breeders' Cup Turf, Eclipse Stakes
2014	God Given	f	Premio Lydia Tesio
2016	Channel	f	Prix de Diane
2016	Burning Victory	f	Triumph Hurdle
2016	Lady Bowthorpe	f	Nassau Stakes
2016	Mutamakina	f	E. P. Taylor Stakes
2019	Desert Crown	c	Epsom Derby

=== Broodmare sire ===
Galileo is a sire of broodmares whose offspring have achieved Group 1 success. He was the leading broodmare sire in Great Britain and Ireland of 2020 after finishing behind Pivotal in the previous years.

Dam	Name	Foaled	Sex	Major wins
Absolute Lady	La Cressonniere	2013	f	Poule d'Essai des Pouliches, Prix de Diane
Alina	Barney Roy	2014	g	St James's Palace Stakes
Azmiyna	The Autumn Sun	2015	c	J.J. Atkins Plate, Golden Rose Stakes, Caulfield Guineas, Randwick Guineas, Rosehill Guineas
Baggy Green (AUS)	Tofane	2015	f	All Aged Stakes, Stradbroke Handicap, Tattersall's Tiara, C F Orr Stakes
Best in the World	Snowfall	2018	f	Epsom Oaks, Irish Oaks
Cabaret	Magna Grecia	2016	c	Vertem Futurity Trophy, 2000 Guineas Stakes
Cabaret	St Mark's Basilica	2018	c	Dewhurst Stakes, Poule d'Essai des Poulains, Prix du Jockey Club, Eclipse Stakes
Forest Storm	Night of Thunder	2011	c	2000 Guineas Stakes, Lockinge Stakes
Galicuix	Galileo Gold	2013	c	2000 Guineas Stakes
Greenery	Lea	2009	c	Donn Handicap
Inner Realm	Intricately	2014	f	Moyglare Stud Stakes
Livia (AUS)	Warning	2016	g	Victoria Derby
Maybe	Saxon Warrior	2015	c	2000 Guineas Stakes, Racing Post Trophy
Misty for Me	Roly Poly	2014	c	Falmouth Stakes, Prix Rothschild, Sun Chariot Stakes
Misty for Me	U S Navy Flag	2015	c	Dewhurst Stakes, July Cup
Nightime	Zhukova	2012	f	Man o' War Stakes
Nightime	Ghaiyyath	2015	c	Grosser Preis von Baden, Coronation Cup, Eclipse Stakes, International Stakes
Perfect Truth	Magicool	2011	g	Queensland Derby
Perihelion	Qualify	2012	f	The Oaks
Starlet's Sister	Sistercharlie	2014	f	Belmont Oaks, Jenny Wiley Stakes, Diana Stakes (twice), Beverly D. Stakes (twice), Breeders' Cup Filly & Mare Turf, Flower Bowl Stakes
Starlet's Sister	Sottsass	2016	c	Prix du Jockey Club, Prix Ganay, Prix de l'Arc de Triomphe
Starship	La Collina	2009	f	Phoenix Stakes, Matron Stakes
Starship	Rivet Delight	2014	g	Racing Post Trophy
Watchful	Watch Me	2016	f	Coronation Stakes, Prix Rothschild
Rhododendron	Auguste Rodin	2020	c	Vertem Futurity Trophy, Epsom Derby, Irish Derby, Irish Champion Stakes, Breeders' Cup Turf, Prince of Wales's Stakes

== Pedigree ==
Pedigree of Galileo (IRE), bay stallion, 1998
Sire Sadler's Wells bay 1981	Northern Dancer b. 1961	Nearctic br. 1954	Nearco
Sire Sadler's Wells bay 1981	Northern Dancer b. 1961	Nearctic br. 1954	Lady Angela
Sire Sadler's Wells bay 1981	Northern Dancer b. 1961	Natalma b. 1957	Native Dancer
Sire Sadler's Wells bay 1981	Northern Dancer b. 1961	Natalma b. 1957	Almahmoud
Sire Sadler's Wells bay 1981	Fairy Bridge b. 1975	Bold Reason b. 1968	Hail To Reason
Sire Sadler's Wells bay 1981	Fairy Bridge b. 1975	Bold Reason b. 1968	Lalun
Sire Sadler's Wells bay 1981	Fairy Bridge b. 1975	Special b. 1969	Forli
Sire Sadler's Wells bay 1981	Fairy Bridge b. 1975	Special b. 1969	Thong
Dam Urban Sea chestnut 1989	Miswaki ch. 1978	Mr. Prospector b. 1970	Raise a Native
Dam Urban Sea chestnut 1989	Miswaki ch. 1978	Mr. Prospector b. 1970	Gold Digger
Dam Urban Sea chestnut 1989	Miswaki ch. 1978	Hopespringseternal ch. 1971	Buckpasser
Dam Urban Sea chestnut 1989	Miswaki ch. 1978	Hopespringseternal ch. 1971	Rose Bower
Dam Urban Sea chestnut 1989	Allegretta ch. 1978	Lombard ch. 1967	Agio
Dam Urban Sea chestnut 1989	Allegretta ch. 1978	Lombard ch. 1967	Promised Lady
Dam Urban Sea chestnut 1989	Allegretta ch. 1978	Anatevka ch. 1969	Espresso
Dam Urban Sea chestnut 1989	Allegretta ch. 1978	Anatevka ch. 1969	Almyra (Family 9-h)

== See also ==
- List of racehorses
