= US Army Ranger (horse) =

Irish-bred Thoroughbred racehorse

- Racing silks of Sue Magnier
- Sire: Galileo
- Grandsire: Sadler's Wells
- Dam: Moonstone
- Damsire: Dalakhani
- Sex: Gelding
- Foaled: 28 February 2013
- Country: Ireland
- Colour: Bay
- Breeder: Orpendale, Chelston & Wynatt
- Owner: Susan Magnier, Michael Tabor and Derrick Smith; Lloyd Williams et al
- Trainer: Aidan O'Brien; Joseph Patrick O'Brien; Liam Howey
- Record: 14: 2-3-2
- Earnings: £428,147

Major wins
- Chester Vase (2016)

US Army Ranger (foaled 28 February 2013) is an Irish Thoroughbred racehorse. In May 2016 he won the Chester Vase on his second racecourse appearance and finished second when favourite for the 2016 Epsom Derby.

== Background ==
US Army Ranger is a bay gelding with a white blaze bred in Ireland by Orpendale, Chelston & Wynatt, a breeding company associated with John Magnier's Coolmore Stud. He was named after an elite Special Forces unit of the United States Army named the Rangers

He was sired by Galileo, who won the Derby, Irish Derby and King George VI and Queen Elizabeth Stakes in 2001. Galileo is now one of the world's leading stallions and has been champion sire of Great Britain and Ireland five times. His other progeny include Cape Blanco, Frankel, Golden Lilac, Nathaniel, New Approach, Rip Van Winkle and Ruler of the World. US Army Ranger's dam Moonstone was a top-class racemare who won the Irish Oaks having previously finished second in The Oaks. Her three previous foals were Nevis (winner of the Lingfield Derby Trial), Stubbs (third in the Doncaster Stakes) and Words (Munster Oaks). She was a descendant of Arctique Royale who won the Irish 1,000 Guineas and was closely related to Ardross, Scorpion and Electrocutionist.

Like many of Coolmore's best horses, US Army Ranger was sent into training with Aidan O'Brien at Ballydoyle. He has been ridden in all of his races by Ryan Moore.

== Racing career ==
=== 2016: three-year-old season ===
On his racecourse debut US Army Ranger contested a maiden race over ten furlongs on heavy ground at the Curragh on 3 April 2016. Shortly before the race he was the subject of strong support in the betting for the Epsom Derby. Starting at odds of 15/8 he raced at the rear of the ten runner field before beginning to make steady progress at half way. He moved up to challenge the leaders in the last quarter mile, took the lead 50 yards from the finish and won "readily" by three quarters of a length from the Dermot Weld-trained favourite Aasheq. After the race Aidan O'Brien commented "Ryan said every time he went for him there was another gear there and he said he didn't go to the last gear" before indicating that the colt would have one more race before Epsom.

US Army Ranger was sent to England and stepped up in class for the Group Three Chester Vase (a major trial race for the Epsom Derby) on 5 May at Chester Racecourse. He was made the 4/11 favourite ahead of his stablemate Port Douglas (ridden by Seamie Heffernan) and four British-trained colts. After racing in second place behind Port Douglas (who was carrying four pounds more) he moved up on the inside to take the lead a furlong out. Port Douglas rallied and the favourite was "hard pressed" in the final strides before prevailing by a short head. The racecourse stewards held an inquiry into possible "team tactics" by the riders of the two O'Brien runners but took no action. Ryan Moore commented "He travelled through the race like a very good horse and I wanted to teach him plenty today. He just wanted to hang left at the end and he didn’t switch his leads and got a bit tired, but he’ll come on plenty for it. He's a beautiful mover with a good mind and a very well-balanced horse. The good ones move very well and he's one of those."

On 4 June US Army Ranger was part of a five horse O'Brien entry in a sixteen-runner field for the Epsom Derby and was made the 7/2 favourite ahead of Wings of Desire and Harzand. After being restrained by Moore at the rear of the field he was switched to the wide outside to make his challenge in the straight. He made rapid progress despite hanging left and got to within half a length of the leader Harzand in the final furlong. Harzand pulled ahead in the final strides and US Army Ranger finished second, beaten one and a half lengths.

After a break of two and a half months US Army Ranger started favourite for the Royal Whip Stakes at the Curragh on 21 August but never looked likely to win and finished fourth of the seven runners behind the four-year-old Success Days. In September he was made odds-on favourite for the Group Three Enterprise Stakes at Leopardstown Racecourse but was beaten half a length into second place by the filly Zhukova. Despite his moderate form US Army Ranger was made the 7/1 third favourite for the Champion Stakes at Ascot Racecourse on 14 October. After tracking the leaders he was outpaced in the straight and finished eighth of the ten runners behind Almanzor.

== Later career ==
US Army Ranger began his four-year-old season by running third to Air Pilot when favourite for the Alleged Stakes in April and then contested the Ormonde Stakes at Chester in May when he produced his best performance of the year, leading a furlong out before being caught on the line and beaten a short head by the six-year-old Western Hymn. After finishing last of the ten runners in the Coronation Cup at Epsom the colt was stepped up in distance for the Queen Alexandra Stakes at Royal Ascot and finished third behind Oriental Fox and Thomas Hobson. His next two runs were disappointing as finished unplaced in the Goodwood Cup in August and the Enterprise Stakes at Leopardstown in September.

In the autumn of 2017 US Army Ranger was acquired by Lloyd Williams and exported to race in Australia. On his debut for his new owner he started a 70/1 outsider for the Melbourne Cup and finished 18th of the 23 runners behind Rekindling. He remained in Australia where he was trained by Liam Howley. He eventually returned to the track in August 2019 when he finished last of seven in a minor handicap race at Caulfield Racecourse.

== Pedigree ==
Pedigree of US Army Ranger (IRE), bay gedling, 2013
Sire Galileo (IRE) 1998	Sadler's Wells (USA); 1981	Northern Dancer	Nearctic
Sire Galileo (IRE) 1998	Sadler's Wells (USA); 1981	Northern Dancer	Natalma
Sire Galileo (IRE) 1998	Sadler's Wells (USA); 1981	Fairy Bridge	Bold Reason
Sire Galileo (IRE) 1998	Sadler's Wells (USA); 1981	Fairy Bridge	Special
Sire Galileo (IRE) 1998	Urban Sea (USA) ch. 1989	Miswaki	Mr. Prospector
Sire Galileo (IRE) 1998	Urban Sea (USA) ch. 1989	Miswaki	Hopespringseternal
Sire Galileo (IRE) 1998	Urban Sea (USA) ch. 1989	Allegretta	Lombard
Sire Galileo (IRE) 1998	Urban Sea (USA) ch. 1989	Allegretta	Anatevka
Dam Moonstone (GB) 2005	Dalakhani (IRE); 2000	Darshaan	Shirley Heights
Dam Moonstone (GB) 2005	Dalakhani (IRE); 2000	Darshaan	Delsy
Dam Moonstone (GB) 2005	Dalakhani (IRE); 2000	Daltawa	Miswaki
Dam Moonstone (GB) 2005	Dalakhani (IRE); 2000	Daltawa	Damana
Dam Moonstone (GB) 2005	Solo de Lune (IRE); 1990	Law Society	Alleged
Dam Moonstone (GB) 2005	Solo de Lune (IRE); 1990	Law Society	Bold Bikini
Dam Moonstone (GB) 2005	Solo de Lune (IRE); 1990	Truly Special	Caerleon
Dam Moonstone (GB) 2005	Solo de Lune (IRE); 1990	Truly Special	Arctique Royale (Family 23)
