= 2014 World's Best Racehorse Rankings =

The 2014 World's Best Racehorse Rankings, sponsored by Longines was the 2014 edition of the World's Best Racehorse Rankings. It was an assessment of Thoroughbred racehorses issued by the International Federation of Horseracing Authorities (IFHA) in January 2015. It included horses aged three or older which competed in flat races during 2014. It was open to all horses irrespective of where they raced or were trained.

The two best horses were both trained in Japan, with Just A Way finishing a pound ahead of Epiphaneia. Next in the rankings came the European three-year-old colts Australia, Kingman and The Grey Gatsby, the Hong Kong gelding Able Friend and the South African horse Variety Club.

== Rankings for 2014 ==
- For a detailed guide to this table, see below.

Rank	Rating	Horse	Age	Sex	Trained	Pos.	Race	Surface	Dist.	Cat.
1	130	Just A Way (JPN)	5	H	JPN	1st	Dubai Duty Free	Turf	1,800	M
2	129	Epiphaneia (JPN)	4	C	JPN	1st	Japan Cup	Turf	2,400	L
3	127	Able Friend (AUS)	5	G	HK	1st	Hong Kong Mile	Turf	1,600	M
3	127	Australia (GB)	3	C	IRE	1st	Juddmonte International	Turf	2,080	I
3	127	Kingman (GB)	3	C	GB	1st	St James's Palace Stakes	Turf	1,600	M
3	127	The Grey Gatsby (IRE)	3	C	GB	1st	Irish Champion Stakes	Turf	2,000	I
3	127	Variety Club (SAF)	6	H	UAE	1st	Champions Mile	Turf	1,600	M
8	126	Treve (FR)	4	F	FR	1st	Prix de l'Arc de Triomphe	Turf	2,400	L
9	125	Bayern (USA)	3	C	USA	1st 1st	Breeders' Cup Classic; Haskell Invitational	Dirt	2,000; 1,800	I M
9	125	Sea The Moon (GER)	3	C	GER	1st	Deutsches Derby	Turf	2,400	L
11	124	California Chrome (USA)	3	C	USA	1st	Kentucky Derby; Santa Anita Derby	Dirt	2,000; 1,800	I, M
11	124	Game On Dude (USA)	7	G	USA	1st	Santa Anita Handicap	Dirt	2,000	I
11	124	Gold Ship (JPN)	5	H	JPN	1st	Takarazuka Kinen	Turf	2,200	L
11	124	Main Sequence (USA)	5	G	USA	1st	Breeders' Cup Turf	Turf	2,400	L
11	124	The Fugue (GB)	5	M	GB	1st	Prince of Wales's Stakes	Turf	2,000	I
11	124	Toast of New York (USA)	3	C	GB	2nd	Breeders' Cup Classic	Dirt	2,000	I
11	124	Wise Dan (USA)	7	G	USA	1st	Maker's 46 Mile	Turf	1,600	M
18	123	African Story (GB)	7	G	UAE	1st	Dubai World Cup	Artificial	2,000	I
18	123	Cirrus des Aigles (FR)	8	G	FR	1st	Prix Ganay; Coronation Cup	Turf	2,100; 2,400	I L
18	123	Designs On Rome (IRE)	4	G	HK	1st	Queen Elizabeth II Cup	Turf	2,000	I
18	123	Flintshire (GB)	4	C	FR	2nd	Prix de l'Arc de Triomphe	Turf	2,400	L
18	123	Lankan Rupee (AUS)	5	G	AUS	1st	Newmarket Handicap	Turf	1,200	S
18	123	Magician (IRE)	4	C	IRE	2nd	Prince of Wales's Stakes	Turf	2,000	I
18	123	Military Attack (IRE)	6	G	HK	1st	Hong Kong Gold Cup; Sha Tin Trophy	Turf	2,000; 1,600	I M
18	123	Palace Malice (USA)	4	C	USA	1st	Metropolitan Mile	Dirt	1,600	M
18	123	Shared Belief (USA)	3	G	USA	1st	Pacific Classic	Artificial	2,000	I
18	123	Taghrooda (GB)	3	F	GB	1st	King George VI & Queen Elizabeth Stakes	Turf	2,400	L
18	123	Terravista (AUS)	5	G	AUS	1st	Darley Classic	Turf	1,200	S
29	122	Akeed Mofeed (GB)	5	H	HK	1st	Centenary Vase	Turf	1,800	M
29	122	Charm Spirit (IRE)	3	C	FR	1st	Queen Elizabeth II Stakes	Turf	1,600	M
29	122	Chautauqua (AUS)	4	G	AUS	2nd	Darley Classic	Turf	1,200	S
29	122	Dundeel (NZ)	5	G	NZ	1st	Queen Elizabeth Stakes (ATC)	Turf	2,000	I
29	122	Gold-Fun (IRE)	5	G	HK	2nd	Sha Tin Trophy	Turf	1,600	M
29	122	Noble Mission (GB)	5	H	GB	1st	Champion Stakes	Turf	2,000	I
29	122	Olympic Glory (IRE)	4	C	GB	1st	Prix de la Forêt	Turf	1,400	M
29	122	Telescope (IRE)	4	C	GB	1st	Hardwicke Stakes	Turf	2,400	L
37	121	Admire Rakti (JPN)	6	H	JPN	1st	Caulfield Cup	Turf	2,400	L
37	121	Al Kazeem (GB)	6	H	GB	2nd	Champion Stakes	Turf	2,000	I
37	121	Blazing Speed (GB)	5	G	HK	1st	Jockey Club Cup (Hong Kong)	Turf	2,000	I
37	121	Dissident (AUS)	4	C	AUS	2nd	Invitation Stakes	Turf	1,400	M
37	121	Kizuna (JPN)	4	C	JPN	1st	Sankei Osaka Hai	Turf	2,000	I
37	121	Mukhadram (GB)	5	H	GB	1st 3rd	Eclipse Stakes; King George VI & Queen Elizabeth takes	Turf	2,000; 2,400	I L
37	121	Night of Thunder (IRE)	3	C	GB	1st	2000 Guineas	Turf	1,600	M
37	121	Toronado (IRE)	4	C	GB	1st	Queen Anne Stakes	Turf	1,600	M
37	121	Will Take Charge (USA)	4	C	USA	2nd	Donn Handicap; Santa Anita Handicap	Dirt	1,800; 2,000	M I
46	120	Adelaide (IRE)	3	C	IRE	1st	Cox Plate	Turf	2,040	I
46	120	Bal A Bali (BRZ)	4	C	BRZ	1st	Grande Premio Estado do Rio de Janeiro	Turf	1,600	M
46	120	Free Eagle (IRE)	3	C	IRE	1st	Enterprise Stakes	Turf	2,000	I
46	120	Goldencents (USA)	4	C	USA	1st	Pat O'Brien Handicap; Breeders' Cup Dirt Mile	Artificial; Dirt	1,400; 1,600	S M
46	120	Ivanhowe (GER)	4	C	GER	1st	Grosser Preis von Baden	Turf	2,400	L
46	120	Karakontie (JPN)	3	C	FR	1st	Breeders' Cup Mile	Turf	1,600	M
46	120	Kingston Hill (GB)	3	C	GB	4th	Prix de l'Arc de Triomphe	Turf	2,400	L
46	120	Lucky Nine (IRE)	7	G	HK	1st	KrisFlyer International Sprint	Turf	1,200	S
46	120	Obviously (IRE)	6	G	USA	1st	Shoemaker Mile	Turf	1,600	M
46	120	Priore Philip (ITY)	3	C	ITY	1st	Premio Roma	Turf	2,000	I
46	120	Protectionist (GER)	4	C	GER	1st	Melbourne Cup	Turf	3,200	E
46	120	Sacred Falls (NZ)	5	H	AUS	1st 2nd	Doncaster Handicap; Queen Elizabeth Stakes (ATC)	Turf	1,600; 2,000	M I
46	120	Spielberg (JPN)	5	H	JPN	3rd	Japan Cup	Turf	2,400	L
46	120	Tapestry (IRE)	3	F	IRE	1st	Yorkshire Oaks	Turf	2,400	L
46	120	To The World (JPN)	3	C	JPN	2nd	Arima Kinen	Turf	2,500	L
46	120	Tonalist (USA)	3	C	USA	1st	Jockey Club Gold Cup	Dirt	2,000	I

== Guide ==
A complete guide to the main table above.

Rank
A horse's position in the list, with the most highly rated at number 1. Each horse is ranked once according to its highest rating. Any lesser ratings for the same horse are not ranked.

Rating
A rating represents a weight value in pounds, with higher values given to horses which showed greater ability. It is judged that these weights would equalise the abilities of the horses if carried in a theoretical handicap race. The minimum rating required for inclusion is 115.

Horse
Each horse's name is followed by a suffix (from the IFHA's International Code of Suffixes) which indicates the country foaled.

Age
The age of the horse at the time it achieved its rating. The racing ages of all horses foaled in a particular part of the world increase simultaneously, regardless of the actual date of foaling.
Dates of age increase by location foaled
Northern Hemisphere	1 January
South America	1 July
Australia, New Zealand and South Africa	1 August

Sex
C	Colt	Ungelded male horse up to four-years-old
F	Filly	Female horse up to four-years-old
H	Horse	Ungelded male horse over four-years-old
M	Mare	Female horse over four-years-old
G	Gelding	Gelded male horse of any age

Trained
The country where the horse was trained at the time of the rating, abbreviated using the International Code of Suffixes.

Position
The horse's finishing position in the race shown. The actual finishing order can sometimes be amended following an inquiry or a disqualification.
=	Dead-heat
↑	Promoted from original finishing position
↓	Relegated from original finishing position

Race
The race (or one of the races) for which the horse achieved its rating. A defeated horse can be rated above its higher-placed opponents if it carried more weight.

Surface
The surface of the track on which the race was run, eg. turf or dirt. Synthetic surfaces are described as "artificial".

Distance
The distance of the race in metres. In some countries (eg. Canada, Great Britain, Ireland and the United States), the length of a race is usually expressed in miles and furlongs. These units have been converted to metres to allow for universal comparison.
Common conversions
5 furlongs	= 1,006 m	1 mile and 1½ furlongs	= 1,911 m
6 furlongs	= 1,207 m	1 mile and 2 furlongs	= 2,012 m
6½ furlongs	= 1,308 m	1 mile and 2½ furlongs	= 2,112 m
7 furlongs	= 1,408 m	1 mile and 3 furlongs	= 2,213 m
7½ furlongs	= 1,509 m	1 mile and 4 furlongs	= 2,414 m
1 mile	= 1,609 m	1 mile and 6 furlongs	= 2,816 m
1 mile and ½ furlong	= 1,710 m	2 miles	= 3,219 m
1 mile and 1 furlong	= 1,811 m	2 miles and 4 furlongs	= 4,023 m

Category
		Metres	Furlongs
S	Sprint	1,000–1,300; 1,000–1,599 (CAN / USA)	5–6.5; 5–7.99 (CAN / USA)
M	Mile	1,301–1,899; 1,600–1,899 (CAN / USA)	6.51–9.49; 8–9.49 (CAN / USA)
I	Intermediate	1,900–2,100	9.5–10.5
L	Long	2,101–2,700	10.51–13.5
E	Extended	2,701+	13.51+

International Code of Suffixes
The following countries have been represented in the WTR as foaling or training locations since the first edition in 2004.
ARG	Argentina	ITY	Italy
AUS	Australia	JPN	Japan
BRZ	Brazil	KSA	Saudi Arabia
CAN	Canada	NZ	New Zealand
CHI	Chile	SAF	South Africa
CZE	Czech Republic	SIN	Singapore
FR	France	SPA	Spain
GB	Great Britain	TUR	Turkey
GER	Germany	UAE	United Arab Emirates
HK	Hong Kong	USA	United States
HUN	Hungary	VEN	Venezuela
IRE	Ireland	ZIM	Zimbabwe

Shading
The shaded areas represent lesser ratings recorded by horses which were more highly rated in a different category. The IFHA publishes this information when the lower rating is the overall top performance in a particular category.
