= Australia (horse) =

British-bred Thoroughbred racehorse

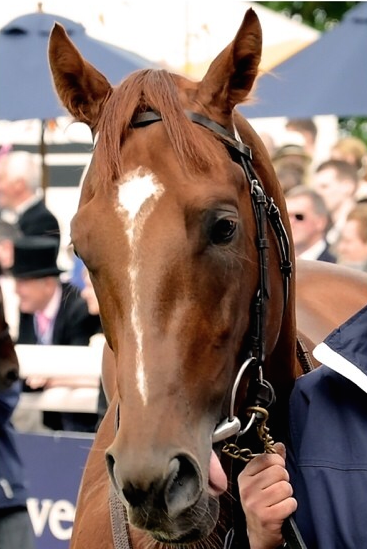
- Australia at the Epsom Derby
- Sire: Galileo
- Grandsire: Sadler's Wells
- Dam: Ouija Board
- Damsire: Cape Cross
- Sex: Stallion
- Foaled: 8 April 2011 (age 14)
- Breeder: Stanley Estate And Stud Co
- Owner: Derrick Smith, Susan Magnier, Michael Tabor & Teo Ah Khing
- Trainer: Aidan O'Brien
- Record: 8:5-2-1
- Earnings: £2,090,503

Major wins
- Breeders' Cup Juvenile Turf Trial (2013); Epsom Derby (2014); Irish Derby (2014); International Stakes (2014)

Awards
- World's top-rated Intermediate distance horse (2014); World's top-rated three-year-old colt (2014)

Australia (foaled 8 April 2011) is an Irish-bred, retired Thoroughbred racehorse and breeding stallion best known for winning the 2014 Epsom Derby. As a two-year-old in 2013, he won two of his three races, creating a very favourable impression when winning the Breeders' Cup Juvenile Turf Trial Stakes, and was highly regarded by his trainer Aidan O'Brien. In May 2014 he finished third behind Night of Thunder and Kingman in the 2000 Guineas before winning the Epsom Derby on 7 June. He subsequently won the Irish Derby and International Stakes before being defeated by The Grey Gatsby in the Irish Champion Stakes. His racing career was ended by injury in October 2014. He is standing at Coolmore stud.

== Background ==
Australia is a chestnut stallion with a narrow white blaze bred by the Newmarket-based Stanley House stud. Australia was sired by Galileo, a Derby winner himself who went on to become an outstanding breeding stallion, winning the title of champion sire on five occasions. Galileo had sired two previous Epsom Derby winners New Approach in 2007 and Ruler of the World in 2013. Australia's dam Ouija Board won seven Group One races including the 2004 Epsom Oaks and was twice named European Horse of the Year. He is the fourth foal produced by Ouija Board and second to Galileo. Australia's older sister Filia Regina had limited success with only a single victory in a handicap at Yarmouth. His half-brother Our Voodoo Prince won three races in Britain before being sold and won a Group Three race in Australia as a gelding before being retired in 2015.

In October 2012, the yearling was sent to the Tattersalls sales where he was bought for 525,000 guineas by the bloodstock agent Dermot "Demi" O'Byrne acting on behalf of John Magnier's Coolmore organisation. For racing purposes, Australia ran in the ownership of a partnership consisting of Susan Magnier, Derrick Smith, Michael Tabor and the Malaysian architect and entrepreneur Teo Ah Khing of Desert Star Holdings. Jockey Joseph O'Brien rode Australia in all the races of his career and wore the purple silks of Derrick Smith on all those occasions.

Co-owner Susan Magnier is in charge of naming Coolmore's horses. Her husband John believes she had kept the name "Australia" for a promising horse who might one day stand at their Australian Stud.

== Racing career ==
=== 2013: two-year-old season ===
Australia's first race was a seven-furlong maiden race at the Curragh on 30 June. He was made favourite, but started very slowly and although finishing strongly failed by a neck to catch the Jim Bolger-trained Renaissance Art. He returned over the same course and distance and recorded his first success, beating ten opponents at odds of 30/100. Australia was then moved up in class for the Group Three Breeders' Cup Juvenile Turf Trial Stakes over one mile at Leopardstown Racecourse on 7 September. In a four-runner field he started second favourite behind Free Eagle, a Dermot Weld-trained colt who had won his debut by five and a half lengths. Australia raced in third behind Kingfisher and Free Eagle before taking the lead approaching the final furlong. In the closing stages he accelerated clear to win by six lengths in "impressive" style.

=== 2014: three-year-old season ===
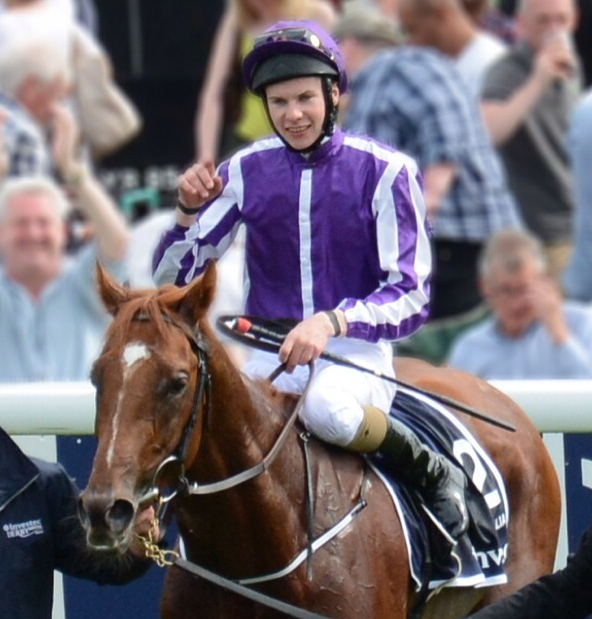
Australia at the Epsom Derby

=== Spring ===
Australia did not contest any trial races in spring 2014, making his seasonal début in the 2000 Guineas over the Rowley mile at Newmarket Racecourse on 3 May. Starting the 5/2 second choice in the betting he raced down the stands side (the left side from the jockeys' viewpoint) as the field split into two groups on either side of the wide Newmarket straight. He took the lead of the stands-side group in the closing stages but was beaten into third by Night of Thunder and Kingman, both of whom had raced on the opposite side for almost all the way.

After the Guineas, O'Brien said he was "delighted" with the run and the ante-post odds for Australia to win The Derby were shortened from 9/4 to 7/4. Australia did not take part in any of the traditional Derby trials but the poor performance of Godolphin's colt True Story in the Dante Stakes caused the odds to be shortened to odds-on. Coral made him 4/6 to win the classic. Despite Australia not competing in any trials many other fellow Ballydoyle horses did. Orchestra won the Chester Vase and the odds on him following up the win with a Derby victory like Ruler of the World the previous year were shortened. Kingfisher won the Dee Stakes whilst Geoffrey Chaucer finished third in a messy renewal of the Derrinstown Stud Derby Trial. Two weeks before the Derby bookmakers reported a surge of bets on Geoffrey Chaucer and eased their price on Australia in response. The threat of rain on Derby day also caused a further lengthening of Australia's odds as it was thought that Kingston Hill would do well on the softer ground.

=== Summer ===
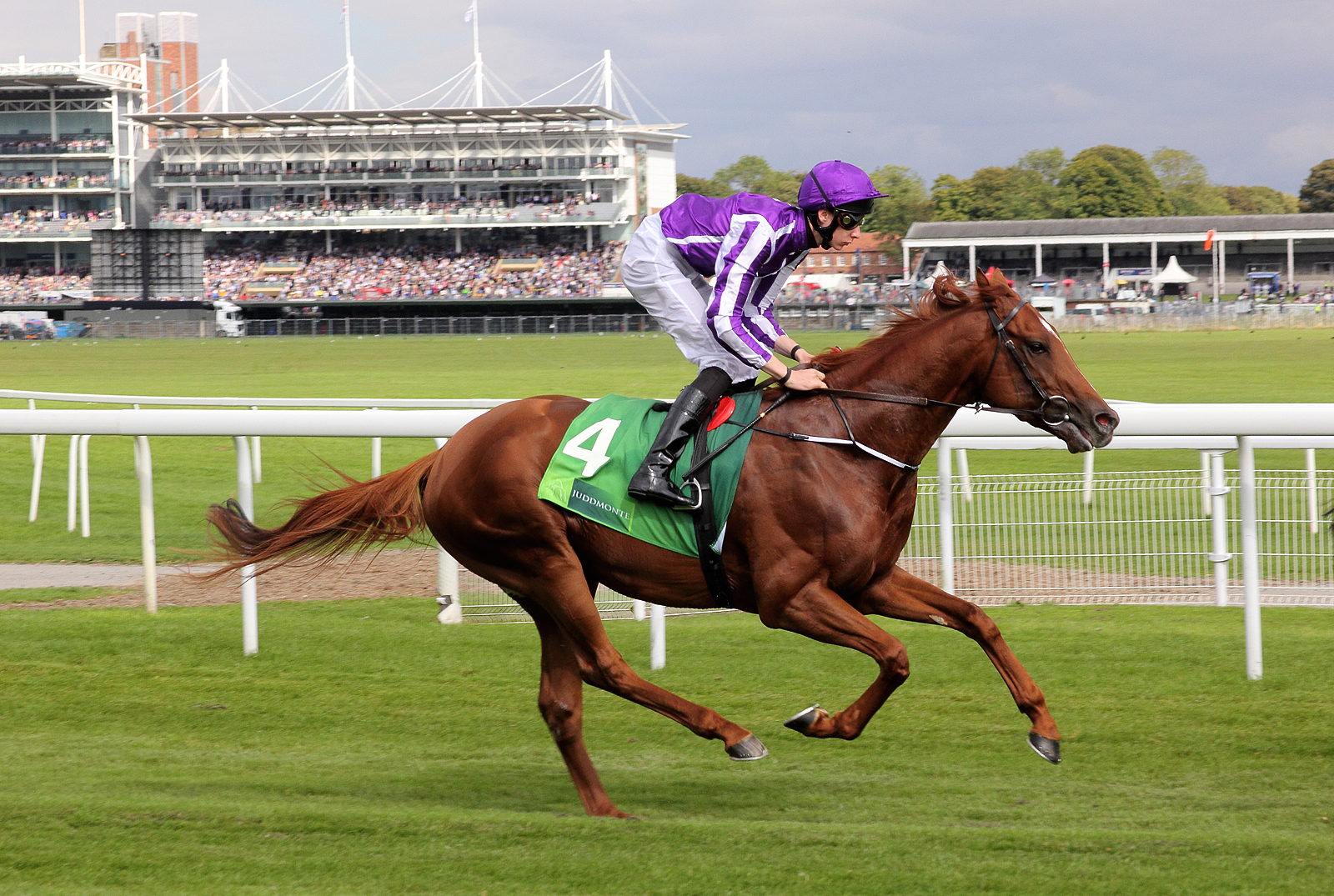
Australia goes to the post for the Juddmonte International at York, 2014

On 7 June, Australia started 11/8 favourite for the Derby ahead of Kingston Hill (15/2) and the Godolphin runner True Story (8/1) in a field of sixteen runners. Australia was calm in the parade ring and on the way to the start and was the final horse to be loaded into the stalls before the race. Once underway the 50/1 outsider Our Channel took the early lead and set a strong pace from Kingfisher, with Kingston Hill next as Joseph O'Brien settled Australia towards the rear of the field. Approaching the final turn Australia made rapid progress on the outside and moved into contention early in the straight as Kingston Hill took the lead. Australia overtook Kingston Hill approaching the final furlong and won decisively by one and a quarter lengths. After the race, Aidan O'Brien said: "Listen, a long time ago we thought he was very special.We wanted to be here with him, but you can never be sure because there are so many variables. Listen, things can go wrong so big credit to everyone at home". Joseph O'Brien commented, "horses don't come any easier to ride than this one. He's the best."

Three weeks after his win at Epsom, Australia contested the Irish Derby at the Curragh in an attempt to follow in the footsteps of both his parents by winning both countries' classics. Epsom Derby second Kingston Hill was withdrawn from the race because of the firm ground, which meant Australia had little serious opposition and started at odds of 1/8. In what was described as "little more than an exercise routine" Australia won very easily by two and a half lengths from his stable companion Kingfisher with Orchestra a further two and a half lengths back in third. After the race Aidan O'Brien confirmed Australia would be targeted at the International Stakes and Irish Champion Stakes as "he'd have no problem going back to 1m 2f."

After a break on 20 August 2014 Australia travelled to York Racecourse to compete in the International Stakes against older horses for the first time. Prior to the race there was speculation as to who would ride Australia as Joseph O'Brien would be unable to make the 8 st 12 lb required and Ryan Moore was booked by Sir Michael Stoute to ride Telescope.

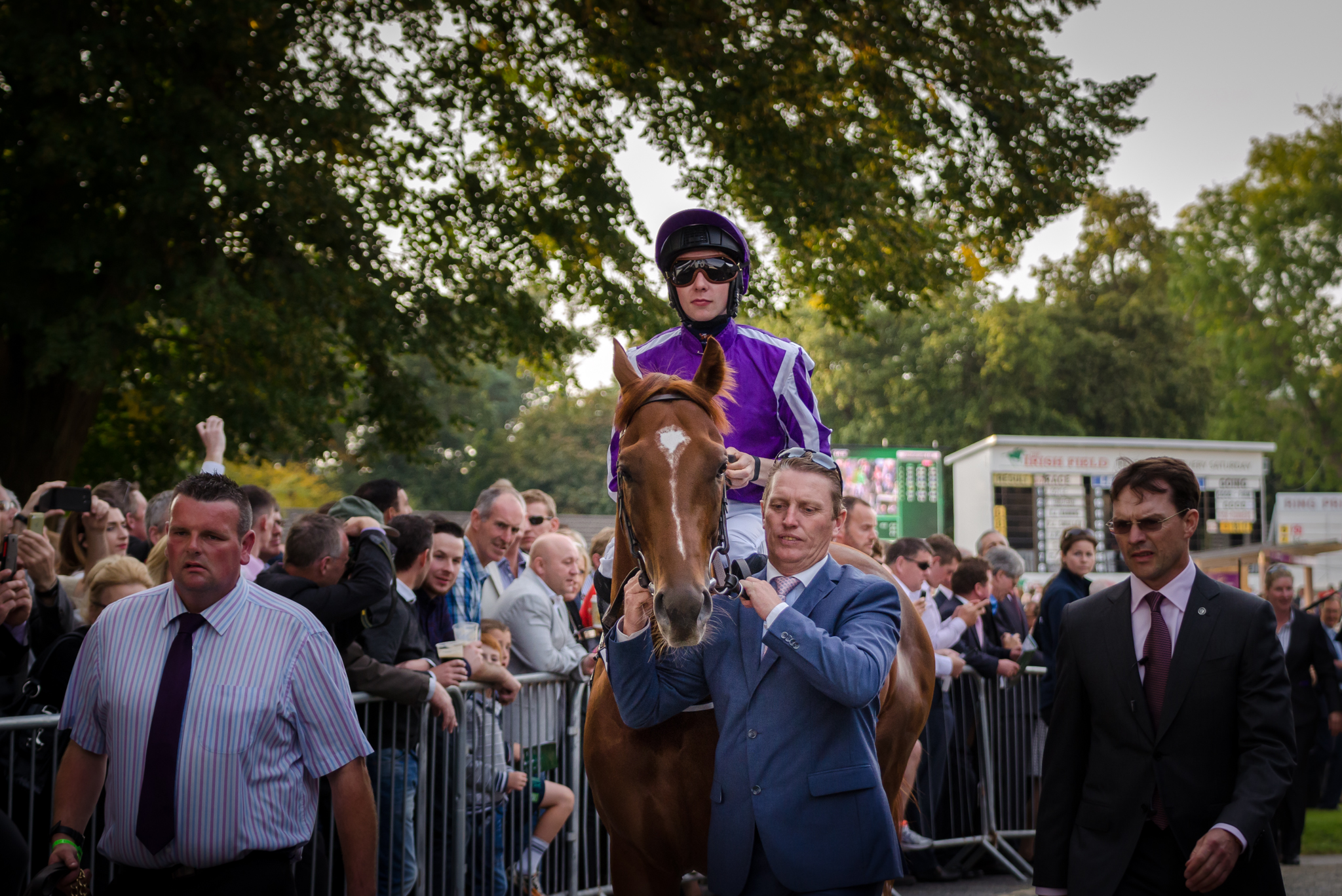
Australia before the final race of his career at Leopardstown

Three days before the race it was revealed Joseph O'Brien was going to make the weight, the first time he would ride under 9 st since riding Magician in the Dubai Sheema Classic. Despite a strong field including Telescope the Hardwicke Stakes winner, Mukhadram the Eclipse Stakes winner and French Derby winner The Grey Gatsby, who had also won the Dante Stakes over the course and distance earlier in the year, Australia started the 8/13 favourite. Stablemate Kingfisher was runner as a pacemaker. Like at Epsom, Australia was last to load and after sitting at the back with The Grey Gatsby they both ran on in the last three furlongs. Australia went on to win, becoming the first horse to complete the Derby-International double in the same season since Sea the Stars.

=== Autumn ===
On 14 September, Australia faced a rematch against The Grey Gatsby in the Irish Champion Stakes at Leopardstown and started the 30/100 favourite against a field which also included Al Kazeem, Mukhadram and Trading Leather despite Joseph O'Brien being unable to ride at 9 st, leading to the colt carrying 9 st 1 lb. He was restrained at the rear of the field before making progress on the wide outside on the turn into the straight. He took the lead approaching the final furlong but was overtaken in the closing stages and beaten a neck by The Grey Gatsby. After the race Aidan O'Brien said "Everything that could go wrong... went wrong" whilst Joseph said "I’d probably do things slightly differently if I had it back again, but we live and learn".

== Retirement ==
On 11 October 2014 as part of a feature about Coolmore on Channel 4 racing's morning line, it was announced that Australia would be retired. It was revealed he had developed a hoof infection and a suspected abscess. Continued lameness due to this problem had jeopardised his preparation for a run in either the Queen Elizabeth II Stakes or the Champion Stakes on British Champions' Day. The decision was made to retire him, and to stand him at Coolmore Stud alongside his father Galileo and fellow Derby winners Pour Moi and Camelot. His first season stud fee was not announced.

== Stud career ==
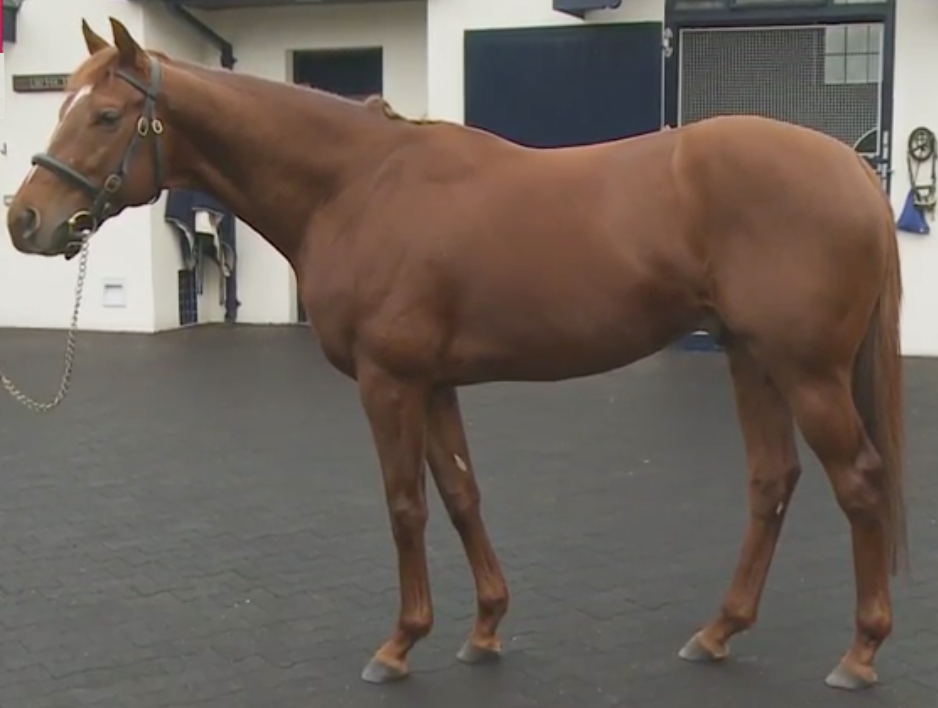
Australia at stud in 2015

On 4 November 2014 Australia's stud fee was announced to be €50,000. He began covering mares in the 2015 breeding season. Mares revealed include Highland Gift, the dam of Golan and Tartan Bearer and Azeema, a half sister to Al Kazeem. His 2016 stud fee remained at €50,000. In 2018, his stud fee was €35,000, which had fallen to €10,000 by 2024. His most important progeny was Lambourn, who emulated him by winning the Epsom Derby in 2025.

=== Notable progeny ===
c = colt, f = filly, g = gelding

| Foaled | Name | Sex | Major wins |
| 2016 | Broome | c | Grand Prix de Saint-Cloud, Dubai Gold Cup |
| 2017 | Galileo Chrome | c | St Leger Stakes |
| 2017 | Order of Australia | c | Breeders' Cup Mile |
| 2017 | Mare Australis | c | Prix Ganay |
| 2018 | Ocean Road (IRE) | f | Gamely Stakes |
| 2022 | Lambourn | c | Epsom Derby |
| 2022 | Cercene | f | Coronation Stakes |

== Assessment and awards ==
In the 2014 World's Best Racehorse Rankings, Australia was rated the third-best horse to race anywhere in the world in 2014 behind the Japanese horses Just A Way and Epiphaneia and level with Able Friend, Kingman, The Grey Gatsby and Variety Club. He was the joint top-rated horse in the Intermediate distance division and the joint top-rated three-year-old.

== Pedigree ==
Pedigree of Australia (GB), chestnut colt, 2011
| Sire Galileo (IRE) 1998 | Sadler's Wells (USA); 1981 | Northern Dancer | Nearctic |
| Sire Galileo (IRE) 1998 | Sadler's Wells (USA); 1981 | Northern Dancer | Natalma |
| Sire Galileo (IRE) 1998 | Sadler's Wells (USA); 1981 | Fairy Bridge | Bold Reason |
| Sire Galileo (IRE) 1998 | Sadler's Wells (USA); 1981 | Fairy Bridge | Special |
| Sire Galileo (IRE) 1998 | Urban Sea (USA) ch. 1989 | Miswaki | Mr. Prospector |
| Sire Galileo (IRE) 1998 | Urban Sea (USA) ch. 1989 | Miswaki | Hopespringseternal |
| Sire Galileo (IRE) 1998 | Urban Sea (USA) ch. 1989 | Allegretta | Lombard |
| Sire Galileo (IRE) 1998 | Urban Sea (USA) ch. 1989 | Allegretta | Anatevka |
| Dam Ouija Board (GB) 2001 | Cape Cross (IRE); 1994 | Green Desert | Danzig |
| Dam Ouija Board (GB) 2001 | Cape Cross (IRE); 1994 | Green Desert | Foreign Courier |
| Dam Ouija Board (GB) 2001 | Cape Cross (IRE); 1994 | Park Appeal | Ahonoora |
| Dam Ouija Board (GB) 2001 | Cape Cross (IRE); 1994 | Park Appeal | Balidares |
| Dam Ouija Board (GB) 2001 | Selection Board (GB); 1982 | Welsh Pageant | Tudor Melody |
| Dam Ouija Board (GB) 2001 | Selection Board (GB); 1982 | Welsh Pageant | Picture Light |
| Dam Ouija Board (GB) 2001 | Selection Board (GB); 1982 | Ouija | Silly Season |
| Dam Ouija Board (GB) 2001 | Selection Board (GB); 1982 | Ouija | Samanda (Family 12-b) |
