= 2014 Epsom Derby =

- Epsom Derby
- Location: Epsom Downs Racecourse
- Date: 7 June 2014
- Winning horse: Australia
- Starting price: 11/8
- Jockey: Joseph O'Brien
- Trainer: Aidan O'Brien
- Owner: Derrick Smith, Susan Magnier, Michael Tabor & Teo Ah Khing
- Conditions: Good

Epsom Derby 2014
1-2-3
Australia	Kingston Hill	Romsdal

Also Ran
4-5-6
Arod	Red Galileo	Western Hymn
7-8-9
True Story	Fascinating Rock	Ebanoran
10-11-12
Kingfisher	Impulsive Moment	Orchestra
13-14-15
Our Channel	Pinzolo	Sudden Wonder
16
Geoffrey Chaucer	16 Ran	2m 33.63s

The 2014 Epsom Derby (known as the Investec Derby for sponsorship reasons) was the 235th annual running of the Derby horse race which took place at Epsom Downs Racecourse on 7 June 2014. The race was won by the favourite, Australia, a British-bred chestnut, trained in Ireland by Aidan O'Brien and ridden by O'Brien's son Joseph. Australia's victory gave Aidan O'Brien his third consecutive victory in the race, and his fifth in all, after Galileo (2001), High Chaparral (2002), Camelot (2012) and Ruler of the World (2013).

== Race synopsis ==
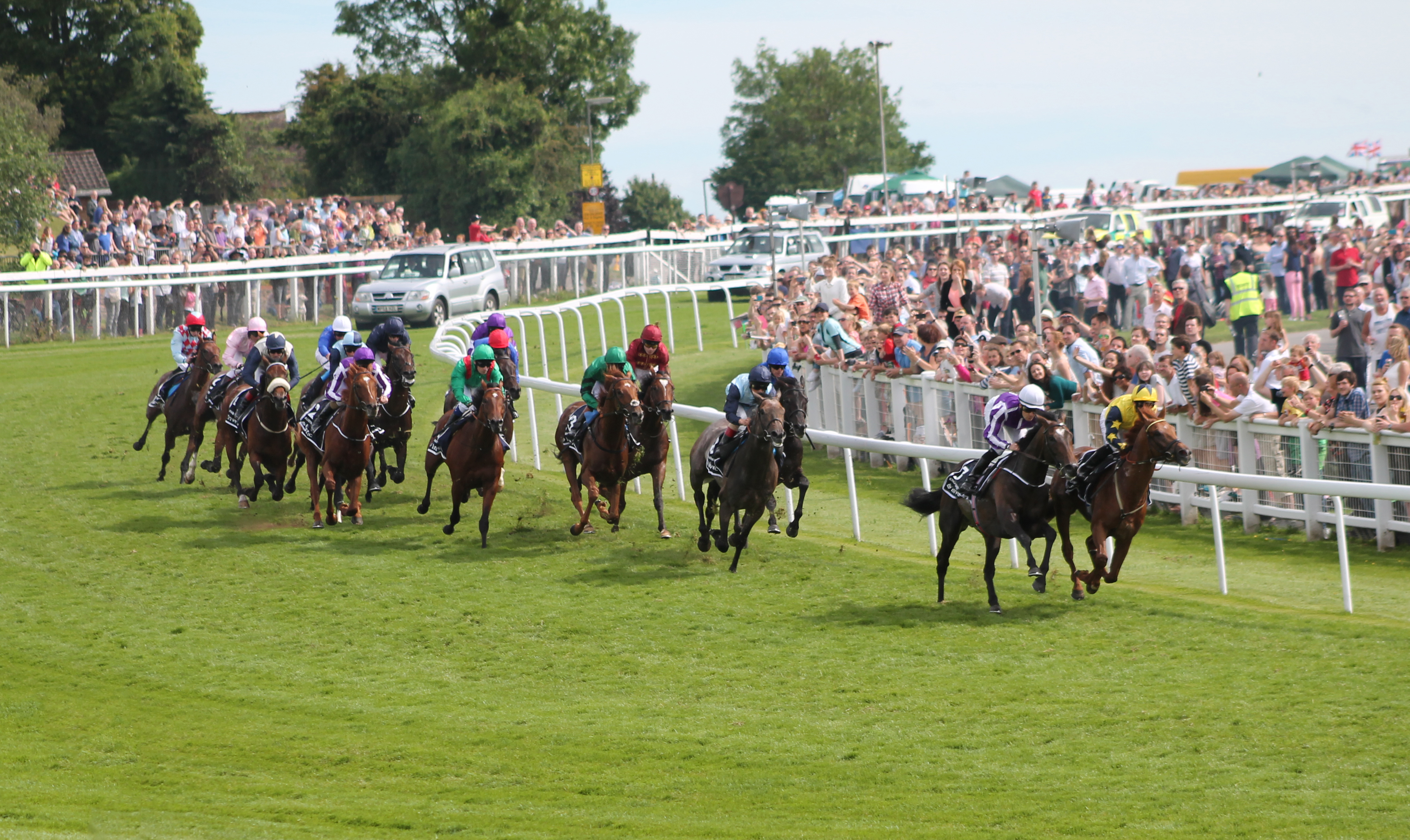
The 2014 Derby field rounds Tattenham Corner.

The initial entry for the 2014 Epsom Derby, announced in December 2012, consisted of 406 yearlings. The number of entries was 32 fewer than for the 2013 race and included 68 from Godolphin Racing and 56 from the partners of the Coolmore Stud. The number of potential runners was reduced to 118 at the first scratching date in March 2014, and subsequently increased to 133 when a further 15 horses were entered at the second entry stage in April 2014. The field for the Derby began to take its final shape at the May scratching deadline when 27 runners were left in the race, and the final confirmation stage on 2 June saw the final field settled at 17 runners with 11 further withdrawals and the additional entry of Romsdal at a cost of £75,000. Snow Sky was withdrawn at the declaration stage on 5 June, leaving 16 runners to contest the 2014 Derby.

On 7 June, 100,000 spectators including the Queen were in attendance at Epsom for the 235th running of the Derby. After heavy rain in the morning, the race was run in fine weather and the going was officially described as "good". Australia started 11/8 favourite ahead of Kingston Hill (15/2) and True Story (8/1). The O'Brien stable's other contenders were Geoffrey Chaucer, Orchestra (winner of the Chester Vase) and Kingfisher (Dee Stakes). Ireland was also represented by the John Oxx-trained Ebanoran and the Dermot Weld-trained Fascinating Rock who had filled the first two places in the Derrinstown Stud Derby Trial. John Gosden saddled two runners: Western Hymn (Sandown Classic Trial) and Romsdal, whilst the Peter Chapple-Hyam stable was represented by Arod. The 50/1 outsider Our Channel took the early lead and set a strong pace from Kingfisher, with Kingston Hill next. Soon after the turn into the straight Kingston Hill went to the front as Australia made rapid progress on the outside. Australia took the lead approaching the final furlong and held off the renewed challenge of Kingston Hill to win by one and a quarter lengths. Romsdal finished third ahead of Arod and the 100/1 outsider Red Galileo.

After the race, Aidan O'Brien said: "A long time ago we thought he was very special, we wanted to be here with him, but you can never be sure because there are so many variables. Things can go wrong so big credit to everyone at home". Joseph O'Brien commented, "horses don't come any easier to ride than this one. He's the best." Roger Varian, trainer of Kingston Hill, expressed his belief that his horse might take on Australia again, saying "The winner is very good and the Guineas form has stood up. I knew how tough my horse is and I was very confident he’d get the trip so I’m hoarse from cheering him. I knew he’d go down fighting. We’ll see what paths we both go down now and they could meet again.”

== Race details ==
- Sponsor: Investec
- Winner's prize money: £782,598
- Going: Good
- Number of runners: 16
- Winner's time: 2:33.63

== Full result ==
	Dist *	Horse	Jockey	Trainer	SP
1		Australia	Joseph O'Brien	Aidan O'Brien (IRE)	11/8 fav
2	1¼	Kingston Hill	Andrea Atzeni	Roger Varian	15/2
3	3¼	Romsdal	Richard Hughes	John Gosden	20/1
4	3¾	Arod	Jamie Spencer	Peter Chapple-Hyam	20/1
5	1¼	Red Galileo	Oisin Murphy	Ed Dunlop	100/1
6	hd	Western Hymn	William Buick	John Gosden	10/1
7	¾	True Story	Kieren Fallon	Saeed bin Suroor	8/1
8	1	Fascinating Rock	Pat Smullen	Dermot Weld (IRE)	12/1
9	1½	Ebanoran	Declan McDonogh	John Oxx (IRE)	12/1
10	2	Kingfisher	Colm O'Donoghue	Aidan O'Brien (IRE)	50/1
11	1¼	Impulsive Moment	David Probert	Andrew Balding	50/1
12	1½	Orchestra	Seamie Heffernan	Aidan O'Brien (IRE)	16/1
13	1¼	Our Channel	Silvestre de Sousa	William Haggas	50/1
14	10	Pinzolo	James Doyle	Charlie Appleby	40/1
15	½	Sudden Wonder	Kevin Manning	Charlie Appleby	66/1
16	61	Geoffrey Chaucer	Ryan Moore	Aidan O'Brien (IRE)	10/1

* The distances between the horses are shown in lengths or shorter; hd = head.
† Trainers are based in Great Britain unless indicated.

== Winner details ==
Further details of the winner, :

- Foaled: 8 April 2011
- Sire: Galileo
- Owner: Derrick Smith, Susan Magnier, Michael Tabor & Teo Ah Khing
- Breeder: Stanley Estate and Stud Co

== Form analysis ==
=== Two-year-old races ===
Notable runs by the future Derby participants as two-year-olds in 2013

- Australia – 1st in Breeders' Cup Juvenile Turf Trial Stakes
- Geoffrey Chaucer - 1st in Beresford Stakes
- Kingston Hill - 1st in Autumn Stakes, 1st in Racing Post Trophy

=== The road to Epsom ===
Early-season appearances in 2014 and trial races prior to running in the Derby:

- Arod - 2nd in Dante Stakes
- Australia – 3rd in 2000 Guineas
- Ebanoran - 3rd in Leopardstown 2,000 Guineas Trial Stakes, 1st (disq) in Derrinstown Stud Derby Trial
- Fascinating Rock - 1st in Ballysax Stakes, 1st in Derrinstown Stud Derby Trial
- Geoffrey Chaucer - 3rd in Derrinstown Stud Derby Trial
- Impulsive Moment - 2nd in Sandown Classic Trial
- Kingfisher - 5th in Ballysax Stakes, 1st in Dee Stakes
- Kingston Hill - 8th in 2000 Guineas
- Orchestra - 1st in Chester Vase
- Our Channel - 1st in Investec Derby Trial
- Pinzolo - 3rd in Newmarket Stakes, 1st in Fairway Stakes
- Red Galileo - 4th in Sandown Classic Trial, 6th in Lingfield Derby Trial
- Romsdal - 2nd in Chester Vase
- Sudden Wonder - 3rd in Lingfield Derby Trial
- True Story - 1st in Feilden Stakes, 3rd in Dante Stakes
- Western Hymn - 1st in Sandown Classic Trial

=== Subsequent Group 1 wins ===
Group 1 / Grade I victories after running in the Derby:

- Australia – Irish Derby (2014), International Stakes (2014)
- Kingston Hill - St. Leger Stakes (2014)
- Fascinating Rock - Champion Stakes (2015)

== Subsequent breeding careers ==
Leading progeny of participants in the 2014 Epsom Derby.

=== Sires of Classic winners ===
Australia (3rd)

- Galileo Chrome - 1st St Leger Stakes (2020)
- Sir Ron Priestley (2nd St Leger Stakes 2019)
- Cayenne Pepper (2nd Irish Oaks 2020)
- Beyond Reason (1st Prix du Calvados 2018)
- Leo De Fury (1st Mooresbridge Stakes 2020)
- Order of Australia (1st Breeders' Cup Mile 2020)
- Broome (1st Grand Prix de Saint-Cloud 2021)
