= Mukhadram =

British-bred Thoroughbred racehorse

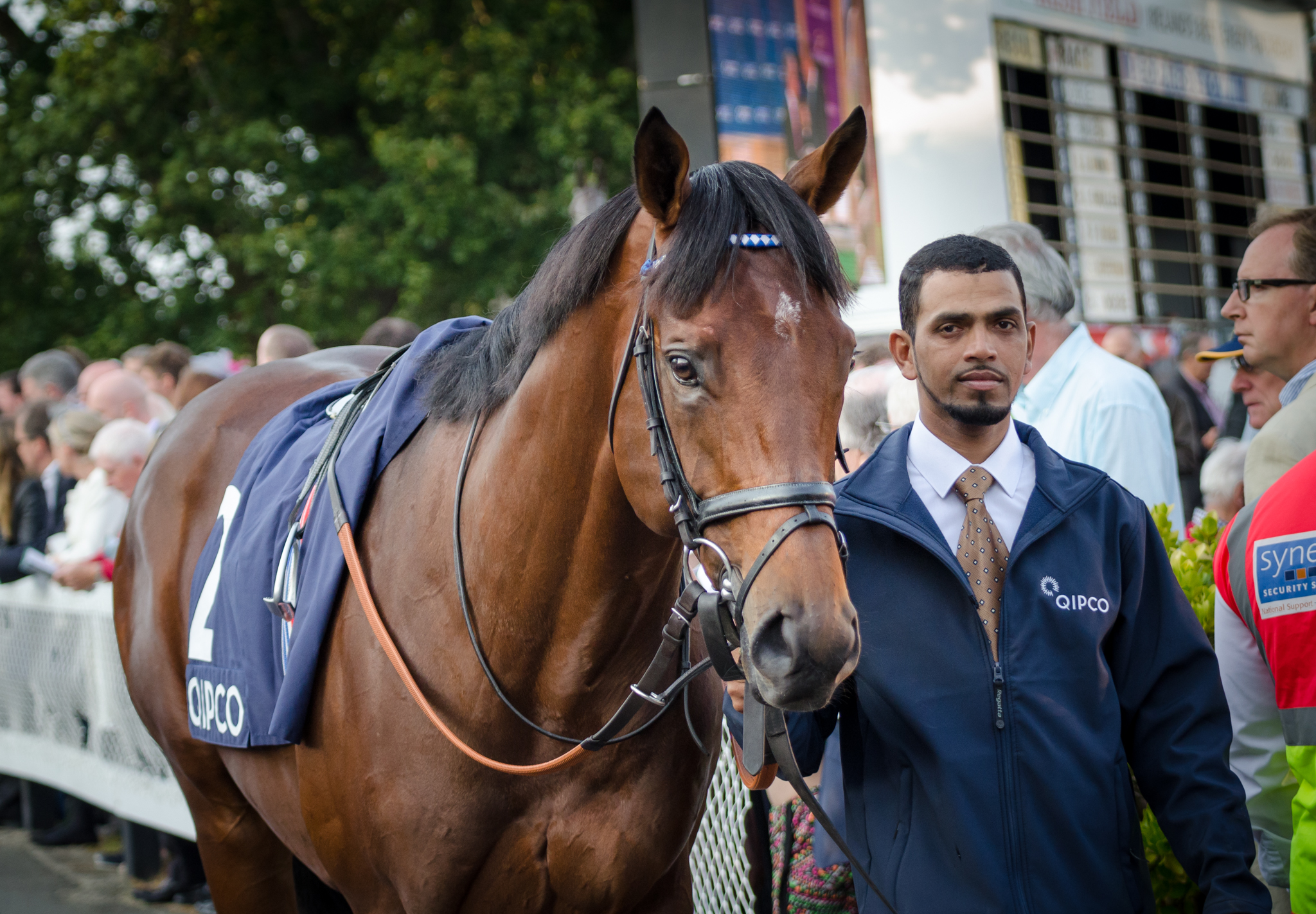
- Mukhadram in September 2014.
- Sire: Shamardal
- Grandsire: Giant's Causeway
- Dam: Magic Tree
- Damsire: Timber Country
- Sex: Stallion
- Foaled: 6 April 2009
- Country: United Kingdom
- Colour: Bay
- Breeder: Wardall Bloodstock
- Owner: Hamdan Al Maktoum
- Trainer: William Haggas
- Record: 16: 5-3-2
- Earnings: £1,968,250

Major wins
- Brigadier Gerard Stakes (2013); York Stakes (2013); Eclipse Stakes (2014)

Mukhadram (foaled 6 April 2009) is a British Thoroughbred racehorse. Unraced as a two-year-old, he showed promise when winning two minor races as a three-year-old in 2012. In the following year he emerged as a top-class performer with a front-running style, winning the Brigadier Gerard Stakes and the York Stakes and being placed in both the Prince of Wales's Stakes and the Eclipse Stakes, In 2014 he finished second in the Dubai World Cup before recording an upset win over a strong field in the Eclipse Stakes. He was retired at the end of the season with a record of five wins from sixteen races.

== Background ==
Mukhadram is a bay horse with a faint white star and a white sock on his left hind leg bred by the Wiltshire-based Wardall Bloodstock. He was from the third crop of foals sired by Shamardal whose wins included the Dewhurst Stakes, Poule d'Essai des Poulains, Prix du Jockey Club and St James's Palace Stakes. Before Mukhadram, his most notable performer was Lope de Vega who won the Poule d'Essai des Poulains and Prix du Jockey Club in 2010. His dam, Magic Tree, bred by Sheikh Mohammed's Darley Stud, finished unplaced on her only racecourse appearance, but was a half-sister to the St Leger Stakes winner Mastery.

Mukhadram was offered for sale as a foal at Tattersalls in November 2009 and was bought for 190,000 guineas by Hamdan Al Maktoum's Shadwell Estate Company. The colt was sent into training with William Haggas at the Somerville Lodge stables in Newmarket, Suffolk. Mukhadram ha been ridden in all of his races by Paul Hanagan.

== Racing career ==
=== 2012: three-year-old season ===
Mukhadram did not race as a two-year-old and made his debut on 19 April 2012 in the Wood Ditton Stakes for previously unraced horses over one mile at Newmarket Racecourse. Starting the 7/2 favourite, he finished second to the Mahmood Al Zarooni-trained Mariner's Cross, but was later awarded the race after the winner was disqualified after a prohibited substance was found in a post-race sample. A month later, over the same course and distance, the colt started 4/9 favourite for a maiden race and won by one and a quarter lengths from Ibtahaj and twelve others. In his next two races, Mukhadram finished fourth in the Tercentenary Stakes at Royal Ascot and second in a race at Newmarket in July. After a break of two and a half months, the colt reappeared in the Cambridgeshire Handicap at Newmarket on 29 September. Carrying a weight of 126 pounds he started at odds of 10/1 (having been favourite in the build-up to the race) in a field of thirty-three and finished fifth behind Bronze Angel.

=== 2013: four-year-old season ===
On his first appearance of 2013, Mukhdaram was moved up in class to contest the Group Three Brigadier Gerard Stakes over ten furlongs at Sandown Park Racecourse on 30 May. He led from the start, opened up a three length lead early in the straight and, despite tiring in the closing stages, held on to win by half a length from the favourite Main Sequence, a colt who had finished second in the 2012 Epsom Derby. After the race, Hamdan Al Maktoum's spokesman Richard Hills said "He's had a few problems but he went to Great Leighs last week for some work and pleased William. We don’t keep many four year olds in training but we thought he could improve and tonight has justified that. He knocked on the door quite a bit last year and ran some good races but I think as a four-year-old he will improve immensely".

In the Group One Prince of Wales's Stakes at Royal Ascot, Mukhadram started a 14/1 outsider. He produced his best performance up to that time, leading from the start and going three length clear in the straight before being caught in the closing stages and being beaten a neck by Al Kazeem with The Fugue and Camelot in third and fourth. Hanagan repeated the tactics in the Eclipse Stakes at Sandown in July, leading from the start before kicking clear in the straight. He was overtaken inside the final furlong and finished third behind Al Kazeem and Declaration of War after being hampered when the winner veered to the right in the closing stages. Three week later, Mukhadram was dropped in class for the Group Two York Stakes at York Racecourse and started the 4/9 favourite against five opponents. Hanagan opted to ride the colt despite being offered the ride on Ektihaam in the King George VI and Queen Elizabeth Stakes at Ascot on the same day. He led from the start as usual and held on in the closing stages to win by three quarters of a length from Grandeur. Commenting on the fact that the colt's advantage had been reduced in the closing stages, Hanagan said "It's long way to be in front. That makes me even more proud of him. I was struggling to get him on the right lead as he's a big horse and takes a bit of organising". On his final appearance of the season, Mukhadram finished fifth behind Farhh, Cirrus des Aigles, Ruler of the World and Hunter's Light in the Champion Stakes at Ascot on 19 October.

=== 2014: five-year-old season ===
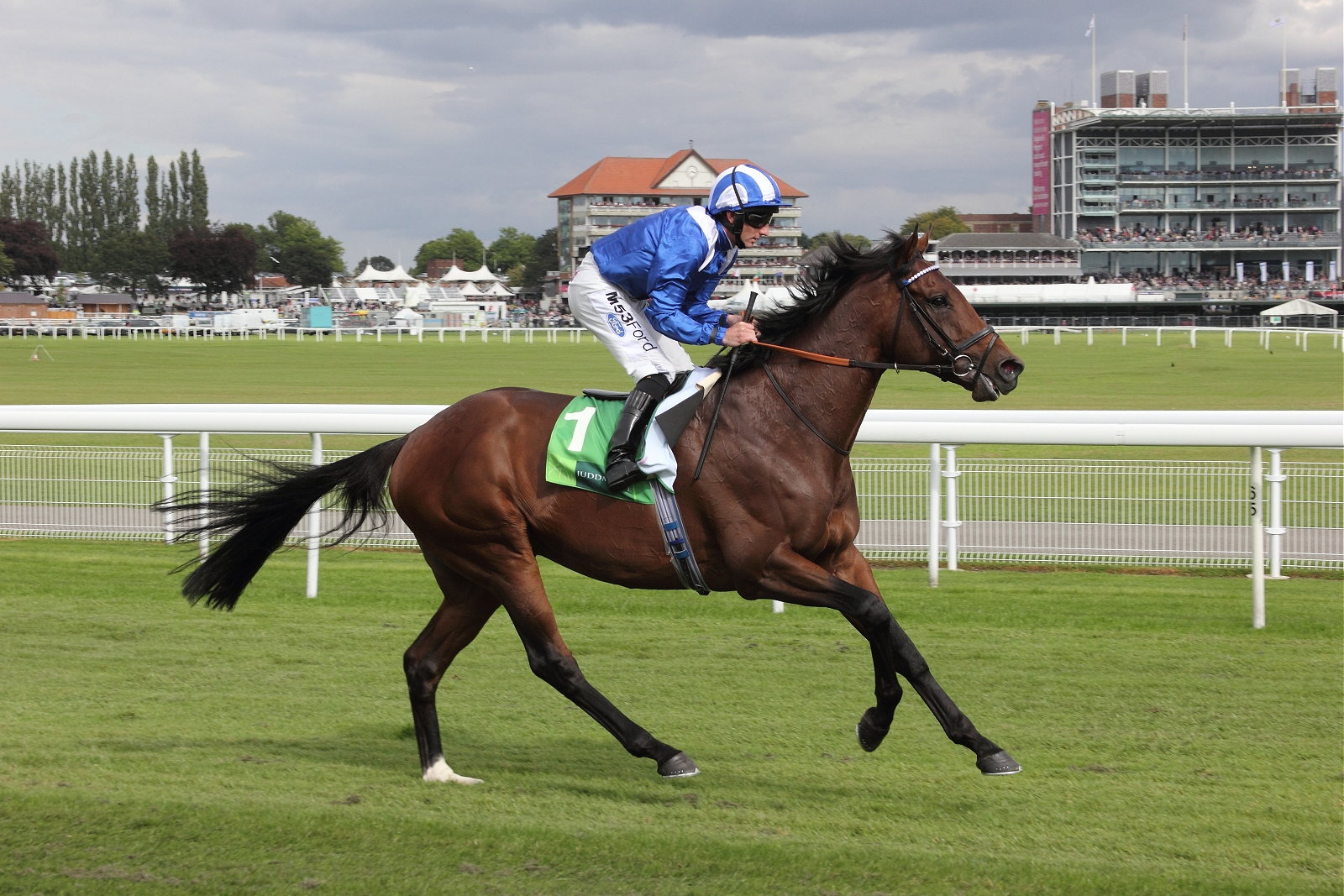
Mukhadram at York 2014

In early 2014, Mukhadram was sent to the United Arab Emirates to contest the Dubai World Cup at Meydan Racecourse. Prior to the race, Hamdan Al Maktoum expressed doubts about the horse's ability to cope with the synthetic Tapeta surface, saying "if you ask me, I'll be happier if the race was run on grass as Mukhadram hasn't run on the Tapeta... the ground conditions change every few metres. New horses to the surface shorten their strides and don't stretch naturally". Mukhdaram went to the front soon after the start and led until the final furlong, when he was overtaken and beaten two and three quarter lengths into second place by African Story. The other beaten horses included Akeed Mofeed, Red Cadeaux, Military Attack, Ron The Greek and Ruler of the World. After the race Hanagan praised the horse's performance saying "I am so proud of him, he ran his absolute heart out. He even tried to battle back when the other one came, he is so genuine".

New tactics were employed when the horse ran for the second time in the Prince of Wales's Stakes at Royal Ascot. Hanagan positioned the colt just behind the leaders in fourth place, but after being slightly hampered in the straight he was never able to reach the leaders and finished fourth behind The Fugue, Magician and Treve. On 5 July, Mukhadram started a 14/1 outsider for the Eclipse Stakes in a field which included The Fugue, Night of Thunder, Kingston Hill, Verrazano, War Command and Trading Leather. Haggas was in confident mood before the race saying that "Mukhadram is a better horse than a year ago – he's much more mature and focussed". Hanagan settled the horse behind the pacemaker Somewhat before taking the lead three furlongs from the finish. He went clear of the field and was never in any danger of defeat, winning by two lengths from Trading Leather, with Somewhat hanging on to take third at odds of 100/1. After the race Hanagan paid tribute to the winner, saying "I know he stays well, I know he gives his all and it's a massive plus when you’ve got a temperament like that. He lobs down to the post, I could put my kids on him". Haggas commented "He's not always had the luck, but we have always believed in him... We know at home how good he is, and he's proved it today". The trainer also indicated that the horse's next target would be the King George VI and Queen Elizabeth Stakes. Some observers, including Channel 4's Jim McGrath, expressed the view that Mukhadram's victory had been partly due to the riders of the more fancied runners misjudging the pace and giving their mounts too much ground to make up in the straight. Mukhadram was then stepped up in distance to one and a half miles for the first time to contest Britain's most prestigious weight-for-age race the King George VI and Queen Elizabeth Stakes at Ascot on 26 July. He started at odds of 12/1 after Hanagan opted to ride The Oaks winner Taghrooda. Ridden by Dane O'Neill, he tracked the pacemaker Leitir Mor before taking the lead in the straight and engaging in a protracted struggle with the favourite Telescope. He eventually finished third of the eight runners behind Taghrooda and Telescope, beaten three lengths and a short head. After the race Haggas said "He's run his guts out... I'm as proud as punch of my horse... the Juddmonte International Stakes could be next". On 20 August Mukhadram was brought back in distance to face the Derby winner Australia as well as Telescope and the Prix du Jockey Club winner The Grey Gatsby in the International Stakes over ten and a half furlongs at York. He tracked the pacemaker Kingfisher before moving forward to briefly take the lead in the straight, but faded in the closing stages to finish fourth behind Australia, The Grey Gatsby and Telescope, beaten seven and half lengths by the winner.

Mukhadram's next race was the Irish Champion Stakes on 13 September. He produced a similar performance to his run at York, briefly taking the lead in the straight before being outpaced in the closing stages and finishing fourth behind The Grey Gatsby, Australia and Trading Leather. On 13 October, it was announced that Mukhadram had been retired from racing. Sheikh Hamdan's racing manager said "he's been a tough, consistent performer and he's a fine, big, good-looking horse so we hope he'll appeal to breeders".

== Assessment ==
In the 2013 World's Best Racehorse Rankings Mukhadram was rated the twenty-ninth best racehorse in the world and the sixth best four-year-old behind Novellist, Declaration of War, Gold Ship, Just A Way and The Fugue. Mukhadram was rated the thirty-seventh best racehorse in the world in 2014.

== Pedigree ==
Pedigree of Mukhadram (GB), bay horse, 2009
Sire Shamardal (USA) 2002	Giant's Causeway (USA); 1997	Storm Cat	Storm Bird
Sire Shamardal (USA) 2002	Giant's Causeway (USA); 1997	Storm Cat	Terlingua
Sire Shamardal (USA) 2002	Giant's Causeway (USA); 1997	Mariah's Storm	Rahy
Sire Shamardal (USA) 2002	Giant's Causeway (USA); 1997	Mariah's Storm	Immense
Sire Shamardal (USA) 2002	Helsinki (GB); 1993	Machiavellian	Mr. Prospector
Sire Shamardal (USA) 2002	Helsinki (GB); 1993	Machiavellian	Coup de Folie
Sire Shamardal (USA) 2002	Helsinki (GB); 1993	Helen Street	Troy
Sire Shamardal (USA) 2002	Helsinki (GB); 1993	Helen Street	Waterway
Dam Magic Tree (UAE) 2002	Timber Country (USA); 1992	Woodman	Mr. Prospector
Dam Magic Tree (UAE) 2002	Timber Country (USA); 1992	Woodman	Playmate
Dam Magic Tree (UAE) 2002	Timber Country (USA); 1992	Fall Aspen	Pretense
Dam Magic Tree (UAE) 2002	Timber Country (USA); 1992	Fall Aspen	Change Water
Dam Magic Tree (UAE) 2002	Moyesii (USA); 1997	Diesis	Sharpen Up
Dam Magic Tree (UAE) 2002	Moyesii (USA); 1997	Diesis	Doubly Sure
Dam Magic Tree (UAE) 2002	Moyesii (USA); 1997	Cherokee Rose	Dancing Brave
Dam Magic Tree (UAE) 2002	Moyesii (USA); 1997	Cherokee Rose	Celtic Assembly (Family 10-c)
