= The Grey Gatsby =

Irish-bred Thoroughbred racehorse

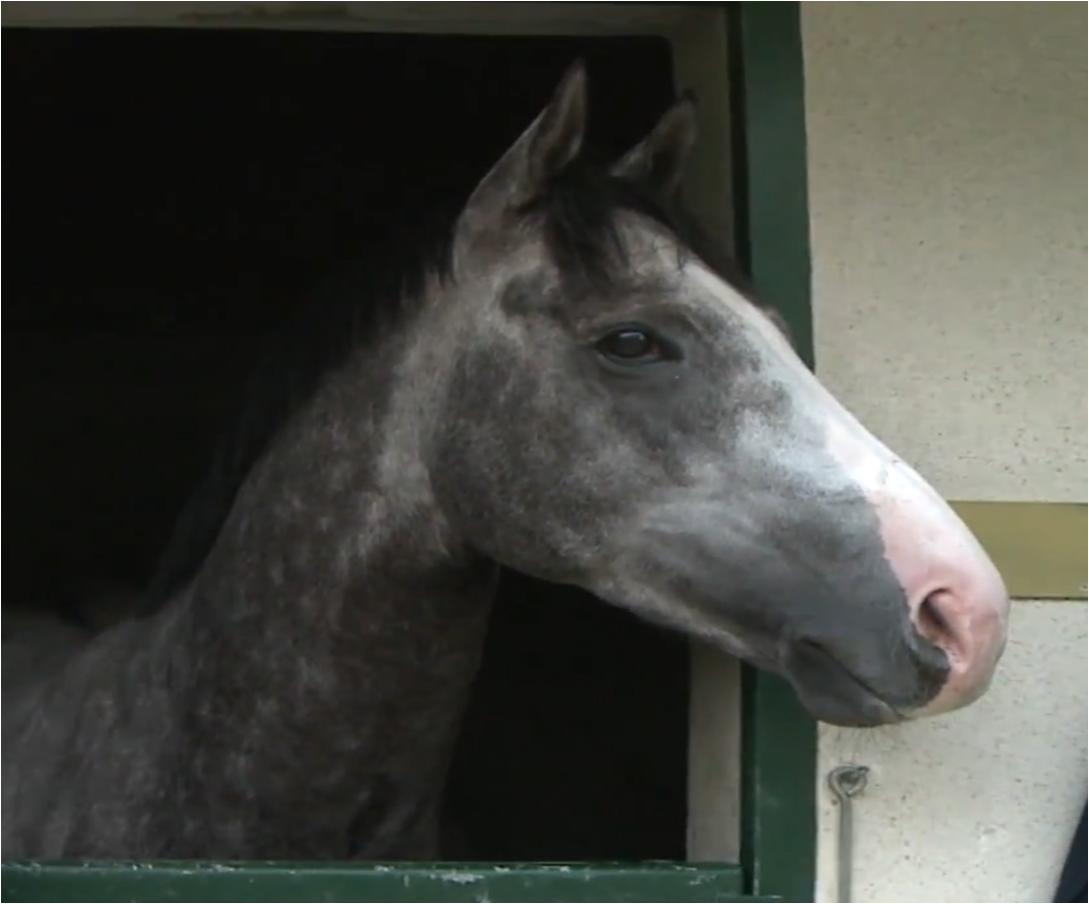
- The Grey Gatsby at Chantilly in 2014.
- Sire: Mastercraftsman
- Grandsire: Danehill Dancer
- Dam: Marie Vison
- Damsire: Entrepreneur
- Sex: Stallion
- Foaled: 14 March 2011
- Country: Ireland
- Colour: Grey
- Owner: Frank Gillespie
- Trainer: Kevin Ryan; Dermot Weld
- Record: 28: 4-8-1
- Earnings: £2,717,026

Major wins
- Dante Stakes (2014); Prix du Jockey Club (2014); Irish Champion Stakes (2014)

Awards
- World top-rated Intermediate distance horse (2014); World top-rated three-year-old (2014); Yorkshire Horse of the Year (2014)

The Grey Gatsby (foaled 14 March 2011) is an Irish-bred racehorse who was trained in Britain and Ireland. In 2014 he established himself as one of the best colts of his generation in Europe by winning the Dante Stakes and the Prix du Jockey Club before defeating the dual Derby winner Australia in the Irish Champion Stakes. At the end of the year he was rated level with Australia and Kingman as the best three-year-old colt in the world. He has continued to compete in Group races until 2017 but did not recapture the form shown in his three-year-old season.

== Background ==
The Grey Gatsby is a grey stallion bred in Ireland by M Parrish. He was one of the first crop of foals of Mastercraftsman, which also included graded winners Kingston Hill, Amazing Maria and Craftsman. As a two-year-old Mastercraftsman won the Group 1 Phoenix Stakes and National Stakes and was crowned Cartier Champion Two-year-old Colt in 2008. As a three-year-old Mastercraftsman went on to record victories in the Irish 2,000 Guineas and St James's Palace Stakes before being retired to stud.

The Grey Gatsby was purchased for €120,000 in May 2013 and was sent into training with Kevin Ryan at his stables near Thirsk, North Yorkshire.

== Racing career ==
=== 2013: two-year-old season ===
The Grey Gatsby began his career winning a maiden race over six furlongs at York. Despite showing signs of inexperience he won by three quarters of a length. In his next two starts, in the Group 3 Acomb Stakes and Group 2 Champagne Stakes he was runner up. In October he was entered into the Group 1 Racing Post Trophy but could only manage seventh place behind fellow Mastercraftsman colt Kingston Hill.

=== 2014: three-year-old season ===
The Grey Gatsby's first start in 2014 was over a mile in the Craven Stakes where he finished two lengths behind the then unbeaten Toormore. Both horses went on to compete in the first classic of that season the 2000 Guineas. The Grey Gatsby went off as a 66/1 outsider in the Newmarket classic and finished in 10th place behind the winner Night of Thunder. His next start was in the Dante Stakes at York Racecourse, traditionally a trial for The Derby. Godolphin's colt True Story, who was entered for the Derby, started as odds-on favourite for the race on ground officially good to soft. The Grey Gatsby, ridden by Ryan Moore for the first time, drifted right in the final furlongs but still went on to win. A stewards enquiry was held but the result stood. Ryan shared plans to run the colt in the Prix du Jockey Club rather than the English Derby. The trainer later said he felt the colt "Didn't get the credit he deserved after the Dante Stakes" with his win overshadowed by the poor performance of True Story.

On 1 June, the colt contested the Prix du Jockey Club at Chantilly. Ridden again by Ryan Moore, he was a relative outsider with French trained horse Prince of Gibraltar starting as favourite. Despite the horse sweating up badly and a poor start Moore was able to get the colt into the lead in the final furlongs and stay there to win by three lengths and in a record time. He was the first British-trained winner since 2005. He returned to France in July for the Grand Prix de Paris, but failed to reproduce his Chantilly form, finishing sixth behind the André Fabre-trained Galante. The Grey Gatsby was matched against older horses for the first time in the International Stakes at York in August. He was restrained at the back of the field by his rider Richard Hughes before moving up to challenge in the straight. He finished second, beaten two lengths by The Derby winner Australia, with Telescope and Mukhadram in third and fourth.

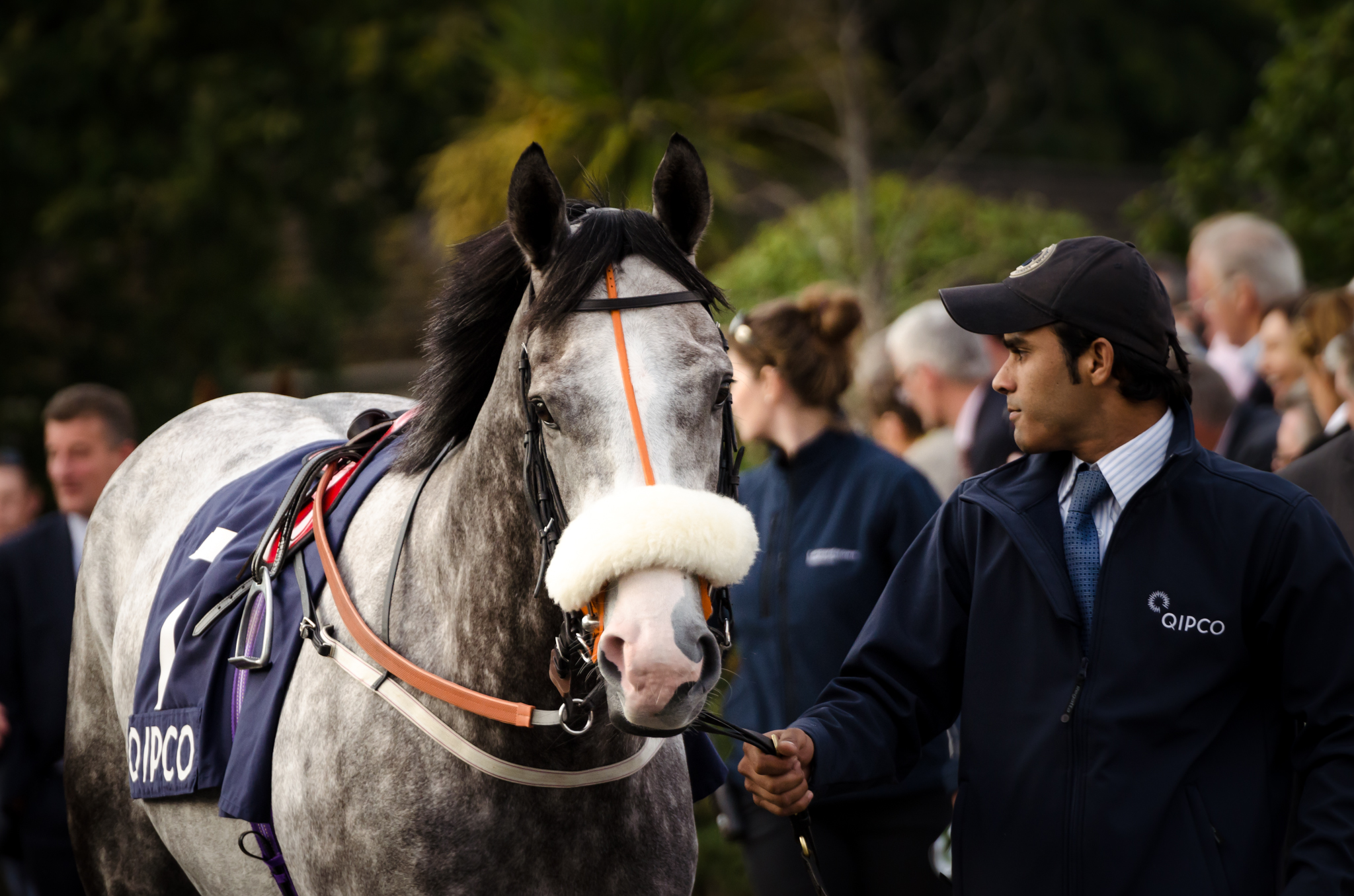
The Grey Gatsby at Leopardstown

On 13 September, The Grey Gatsby (ridden by Moore) faced Australia again in the Irish Champion Stakes over ten furlongs at Leopardstown Racecourse. He was made the 7/1 second favourite behind the Derby winner in a field which also included Mukhadram, Al Kazeem and Trading Leather. Moore held the colt up at the back of the field and was still in last place on the turn into the straight. Australia took the lead with a quarter of mile left to run, but The Grey Gatsby produced a sustained run on the outside to catch the Derby winner in the final strides and win by a neck. Commenting on the colt's late challenge Moore said "I was confident that I’d pass five of [the horses in front]. I just wasn’t quite so confident about the sixth (Australia)" whilst Ryan said; "He's a great horse and it was a fantastic ride. Now the horse will get the credit that he deserves. He hasn’t had it yet". The Grey Gatsby was expected to end the season in the Champion Stakes in October, but was withdrawn six days before the race as Ryan felt the colt would be unsuited by the softening ground.

=== 2015: four-year-old season ===
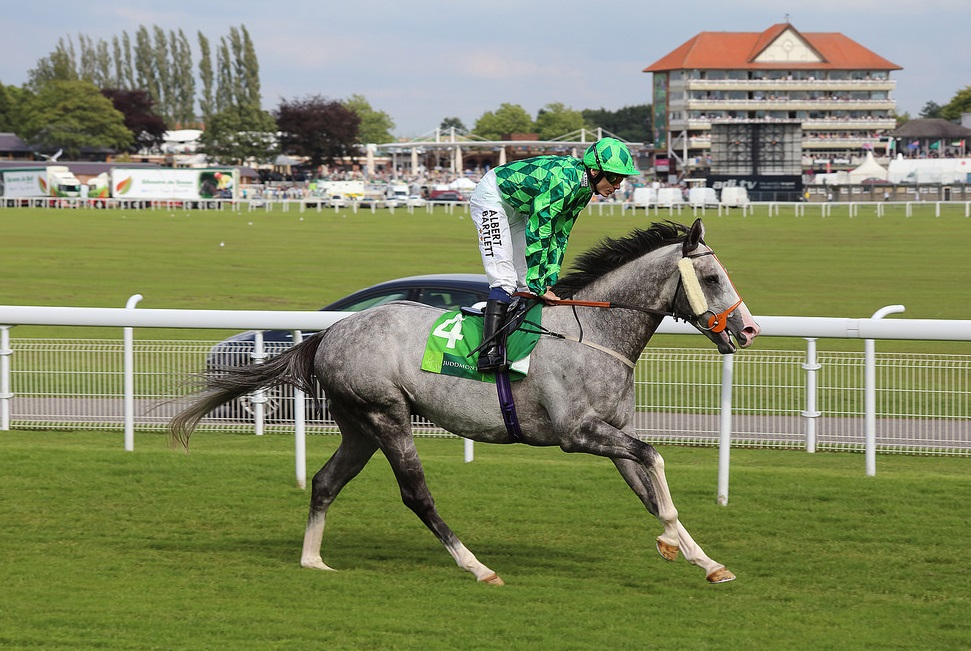
The Grey Gatsby at York

For his first appearance as a four-year-old, The Grey Gatsby was sent to Dubai to contest the Dubai Turf over nine furlongs at Meydan Racecourse on 28 March. He started the 6/4 favourite but finished second behind the French five-year-old Solow. On his return to Europe he started favourite for the Tattersalls Gold Cup at the Curragh but finished fourth of the six runners behind Al Kazeem. At Royal Ascot in June the colt started the 9/2 second favourite behind Free Eagle in the Prince of Wales's Stakes, a race which also attracted Spielberg from Japan and Ectot from France. After racing on the inside just behind the leaders he was repeatedly denied a clear run in the straight and failed by a short head to catch Free Eagle after finishing strongly. Despite his defeat, the Racing Post rated The Grey Gatsby's run as the best performance of the five-day meeting.

On 4 July, The Grey Gatsby was matched against The Derby winner Golden Horn in the Eclipse Stakes at Sandown. After tracking the Derby winner until the turn into the straight Spencer moved up alongside Golden Horn but was outpaced in the final furlong and finished second, three and a half lengths behind the winner, but four and a half lengths clear of the other runners. In August, he faced Golden Horn again in the International Stakes and started 5/1 third favourite behind the Derby winner and the improving three-year-old Time Test. He was held up at the rear of the field by Spencer before making progress in the straight but never looked likely to win and finished third to the 50/1 outsider Arabian Queen, who defeated Golden Horn by a neck. In September ran against Golden Horn for the third time as he attempted to repeat his 2014 success in the Irish Champion Stakes. He was held up at the rear of the field but made little progress in the straight and finished sixth of the seven runners.

=== 2016: five-year-old season ===
The Grey Gatsby stayed in training as a five-year-old but struggled to recapture his best form. He finished fourth to My Dream Boat in the Prince of Wales's Stakes and was then beaten by Big Orange when favourite for the Princess of Wales's Stakes at Newmarket in July. He ran sixth behind Postponed in a strong renewal of the International Stakes and then finished last of the sixteen runners in the Prix de l'Arc de Triomphe. In the Champion Stakes at Ascot on 14 October he produced an improved effort, briefly taking the lead in the straight before finishing fifth behind Almanzor, Found, Jack Hobbs and My Dream Boat.

=== 2017: six-year-old season ===
In January 2017 The Grey Gatsby was transferred to the stable of Dermot Weld in Ireland. He failed to recapture his form, finishing no better than fourth in six races, and was retired at the end of the year.

== Assessment and awards ==
In the 2014 World's Best Racehorse Rankings, The Grey Gatsby was rated the third-best horse to race anywhere in the world in 2014 behind the Japanese horses Just A Way and Epiphaneia and level with Able Friend, Australia, Kingman and Variety Club. He was the joint top-rated horse in the Intermediate distance division and the joint top-rated three-year-old. In December 2014 he was named Yorkshire Horse of the Year.

== Stud career ==
The Grey Gatsby began his career as a breeding stallion at the Haras du Petit Tellier in France.

== Pedigree ==
Pedigree of The Grey Gatsby, grey colt, 2011
Sire Mastercraftsman (IRE) 2006	Danehill Dancer (IRE); 1993	Danehill	Danzig
Sire Mastercraftsman (IRE) 2006	Danehill Dancer (IRE); 1993	Danehill	Razyana
Sire Mastercraftsman (IRE) 2006	Danehill Dancer (IRE); 1993	Mira Adonde	Sharpen Up
Sire Mastercraftsman (IRE) 2006	Danehill Dancer (IRE); 1993	Mira Adonde	Lettre d'Amour
Sire Mastercraftsman (IRE) 2006	Starlight Dreams (USA); 1995	Black Tie Affair	Miswaki
Sire Mastercraftsman (IRE) 2006	Starlight Dreams (USA); 1995	Black Tie Affair	Hat Tab Girl
Sire Mastercraftsman (IRE) 2006	Starlight Dreams (USA); 1995	Reves Celestes	Lyphard
Sire Mastercraftsman (IRE) 2006	Starlight Dreams (USA); 1995	Reves Celestes	Tobira Celeste
Dam Marie Vison (IRE) 2001	Entrepreneur (IRE); 1994	Sadler's Wells	Northern Dancer
Dam Marie Vison (IRE) 2001	Entrepreneur (IRE); 1994	Sadler's Wells	Fairy Bridge
Dam Marie Vison (IRE) 2001	Entrepreneur (IRE); 1994	Exclusive Order	Exclusive Native
Dam Marie Vison (IRE) 2001	Entrepreneur (IRE); 1994	Exclusive Order	Bonavista
Dam Marie Vison (IRE) 2001	Metisse (USA); 1995	Kingmambo	Mr. Prospector
Dam Marie Vison (IRE) 2001	Metisse (USA); 1995	Kingmambo	Miesque
Dam Marie Vison (IRE) 2001	Metisse (USA); 1995	Maximova	Green Dancer
Dam Marie Vison (IRE) 2001	Metisse (USA); 1995	Maximova	Baracala (Family 2-s)
