= Night of Thunder (horse) =

Irish-bred Thoroughbred racehorse

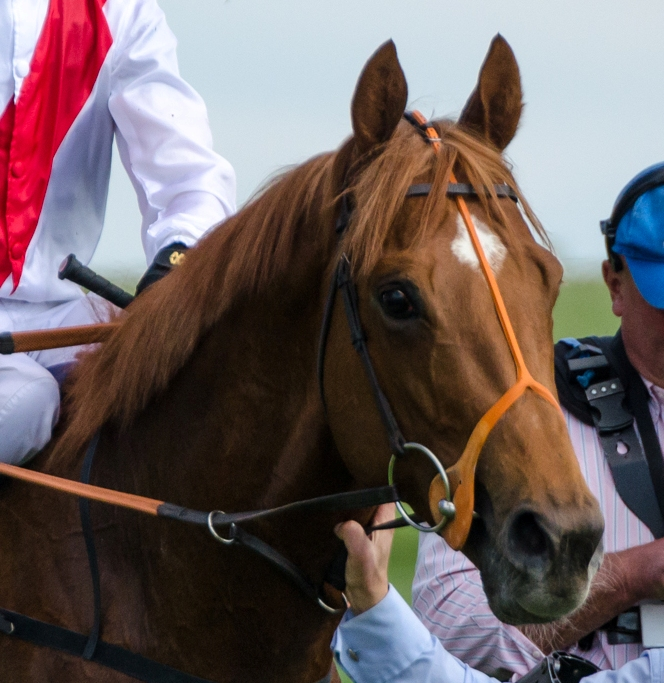
- Night of Thunder at the 2014 2000 Guineas.
- Sire: Dubawi
- Grandsire: Dubai Millennium
- Dam: Forest Storm
- Damsire: Galileo
- Sex: Stallion
- Foaled: 12 March 2011
- Country: Ireland
- Colour: Chestnut
- Breeder: Frank Dunne
- Owner: Saeed Manana; Godolphin
- Trainer: Richard Hannon Sr. Richard Hannon Jr.
- Record: 11:4-3-1
- Earnings: £872,361

Major wins
- Doncaster Stakes (2013); 2000 Guineas (2014); Lockinge Stakes (2015)

Night of Thunder (foaled 12 March 2011) is an Irish-bred, British-trained Thoroughbred racehorse and breeding stallion. In May 2014, he won the 2000 Guineas. He failed to win again as a three-year-old but finished second in both the St James's Palace Stakes and the Queen Elizabeth II Stakes and third in the Prix du Moulin. On his four-year-old debut, he won the Lockinge Stakes.

== Background ==
Night of Thunder is a chestnut colt with a white star and two white socks bred in Ireland by Frank Dunne. He was sired by Dubawi, a top-class son of Dubai Millennium, whose wins included the Irish 2,000 Guineas and the Prix Jacques Le Marois. At stud, Dubawi has been a highly successful breeding stallion, siring major winners such as Monterosso, Al Kazeem, Makfi, Lucky Nine, and Poet's Voice.

As a yearling, Night of Thunder was sent to the Tattersalls sales, where he was bought for 32,000 guineas by representatives of Rabbah Bloodstock. Night of Thunder entered into the ownership of Saeed Manana and was sent into training with Richard Hannon Sr. at East Everleigh in Wiltshire.

== Racing career ==
=== 2013: two-year-old season ===
Night of Thunder began his racing career in a six-furlong maiden race at Goodwood Racecourse on 13 October 2013 in which he was ridden by Richard Hughes and started the 9/2 favourite against eleven opponents. He took the lead two furlongs from the finish and drew clear in the closing stages to win by six lengths from Nakuti. Two weeks later, the colt started 6/4 favourite for the Listed Doncaster Stakes on soft ground at Doncaster Racecourse. Ridden again by Hughes, he took the lead a furlong from the finish and won "very readily" by three lengths from Aeolus.

At the end of the year, the running of the East Everleigh stable was passed from Richard Hannon Sr. to his son Richard Hannon Jr.

=== 2014: three-year-old season ===
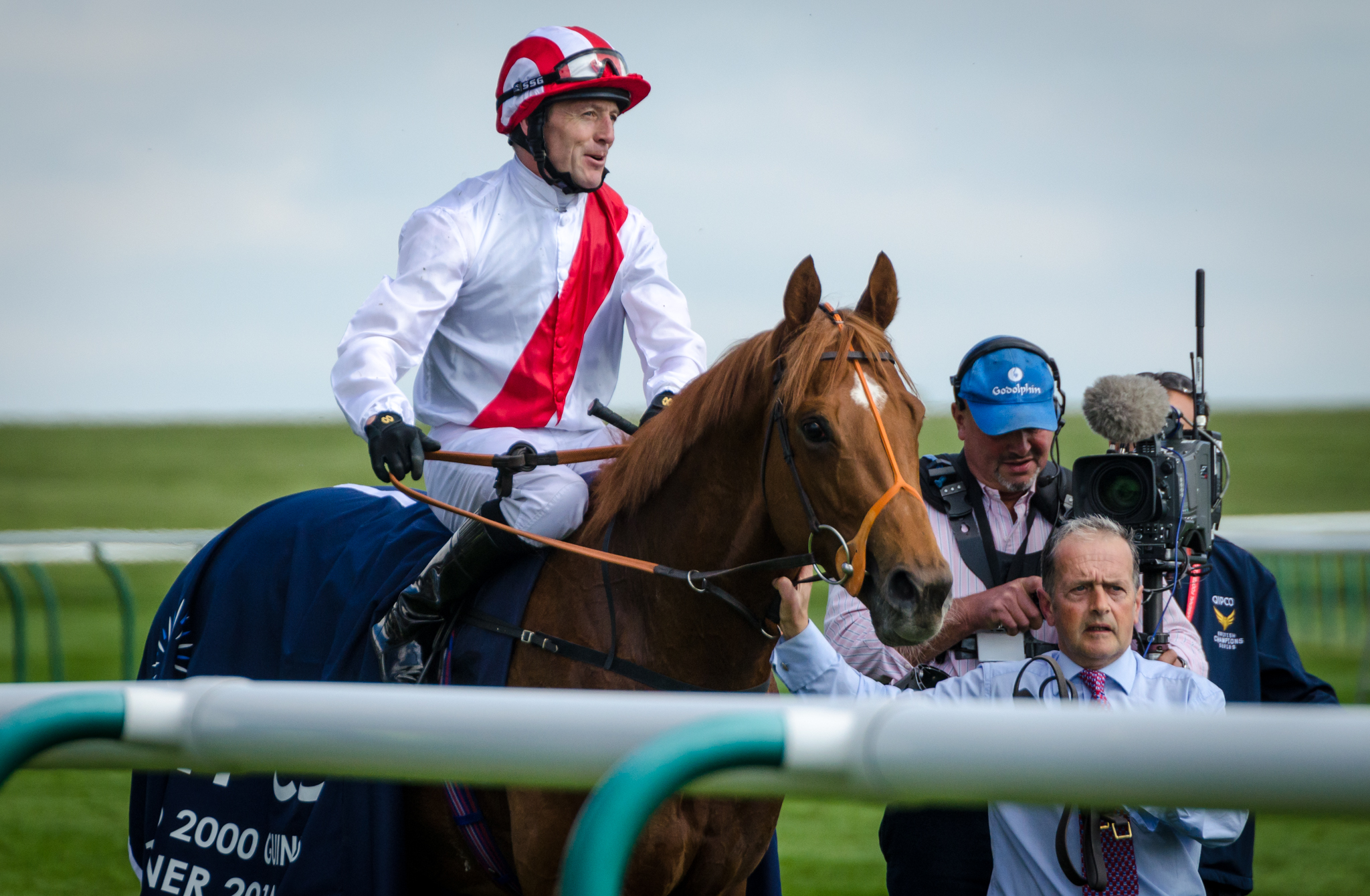
Night of Thunder with jockey Kieren Fallon after winning the 2000 Guineas.

On his three-year-old debut, Night of Thunder contested the Greenham Stakes, a major trial race for the 2000 Guineas, run at Newbury Racecourse on 12 April. Starting the 11/4 second favourite in a field which included the Royal Lodge Stakes winner Berkshire, the Middle Park Stakes winner Astaire, and the Solario Stakes winner Kingman. Night of Thunder tracked the leader, Astaire, for most of the race and moved up to dispute the lead approaching the final furlong. At this point, he was overtaken by Kingman and finished second, beaten four and a half lengths by the winner.

On 3 May 2014, Night of Thunder started a 40/1 outsider for the 206th running of the 2000 Guineas over the Rowley Mile course at Newmarket Racecourse. The other runners included Kingman, Kingston Hill, Australia, Toormore, Outstrip, and War Command. Hughes opted to ride Toormore, allowing 49-year-old veteran Kieren Fallon to take the ride on Night of Thunder. The fourteen-runner field split into two groups, with Night of Thunder joining the group racing on the far side (the right-hand side from the jockey's viewpoint). In the closing stages, Australia overtook Toormore on the stands side, whilst Kingman took the lead from the Spanish colt Noozhoh Canarias on the far side as Night of Thunder began to make rapid progress. Night of Thunder overtook Kingman inside the final furlong but then veered sharply to the left across the wide Newmarket straight. On the line, Night of Thunder won by half a length from Kingman, with Australia a head away in third. The form of the race was subsequently boosted by the performances of the beaten horses: Kingman won the Irish 2,000 Guineas, Australia and Kingston Hill finished first and second in The Derby, and The Grey Gatsby won the Dante Stakes and the Prix du Jockey Club.

Night of Thunder did not return until Royal Ascot, where he started 3/1 second favourite behind Kingman for the St James's Palace Stakes on 18 June. Ridden by Hughes, he led from the start until the last 100 yards, where he was overtaken and beaten two and a quarter lengths by Kingman. On 5 July, the colt was moved up in distance and matched against older horses for the first time in the Eclipse Stakes over ten furlongs at Sandown Park Racecourse. He started the 7/2 second favourite but after reaching fourth place in the straight, he weakened in the closing stages and finished eighth of the nine runners behind Mukhadram.

In September, the colt was sent to France to contest the Prix du Moulin over 1600 metres at Longchamp Racecourse. Ridden by Ryan Moore, he started slowly and raced at the back of the field before making progress in the straight. He finished third, beaten a head and a neck by Charm Spirit and the favourite, Toronado. On 18 October, Night of Thunder met Charm Spirit again in the Queen Elizabeth II Stakes at Ascot and started 2/1 favourite in a field which also included Integral, Toormore and Kingsbarns. Restrained at the back of the eleven runners field in the early stages, the colt was switched to the outside and back to the inside as Hughes attempted to obtain a clear run. He finished strongly but failed to overhaul Charm Spirit and finished second, beaten half a length.

=== 2015: four-year-old season ===
Before the start of the 2015 season, Night of Thunder was bought by Godolphin Racing but remained in Hannon's stable. He made his first appearance of the year in the Lockinge Stakes on the straight mile course at Newbury on 16 May. He started the 11/4 joint favourite with the filly Integral, winner of the Falmouth Stakes and Sun Chariot Stakes. Toormore was again in opposition, whilst the other leading contenders in the sixteen-runner field included Custom Cut (Joel Stakes, Sandown Mile), Here Comes When (Challenge Stakes), and Mooharib. Ridden by James Doyle, he tracked the leaders before taking the lead approaching the final furlong as the leaders tracked across to the far-side rail (the left side of the course from the jockeys' viewpoint). Night of Thunder held off the late run of Toormore to win by a neck with Arod taking third ahead of Integral. Doyle said, "This is just the start of his campaign and there'll be more to come. He's a big type and went to win his race and had a puff and ground it out nicely. He's got a great attitude", whilst Hannon indicated that the colt would be aimed at the Queen Anne Stakes at Royal Ascot.

In the Queen Anne Stakes at Royal Ascot, Night of Thunder started the 4/1 third favourite behind Solow and Able Friend. He raced just behind the leaders but was unable to make any progress in the last quarter mile and finished fifth of the eight runners, almost five lengths behind the winner Solow. Night of Thunder faced Solow again in the Sussex Stakes at Goodwood and started 5/1 second favourite. He reached third place in the straight but weakened in the closing stages and finished sixth of the eight runners behind the French gelding.

== Assessment ==
In the 2014 World's Best Racehorse Rankings, Night of Thunder was rated the 37th best racehorse in the world and the tenth best three-year-old male.

== Stud record ==
Night of Thunder stands at Kildangan Stud for a fee of €450,000, the largest ever advertised fee in Europe.

=== Notable stock ===
Night of Thunder Group 1/Grade 1 winners:

c = colt, f = filly, g = gelding

Foaled	Name	Sex	Major wins
2017	Highfield Princess	f	Prix Maurice de Gheest, Nunthorpe Stakes, Flying Five Stakes, Prix de l'Abbaye de Longchamp
2017	Kukeracha	g	Queensland Derby
2017	Thundering Nights	f	Pretty Polly Stakes
2020	Choisya	f	Jenny Wiley Stakes
2021	Economics	c	Irish Champion Stakes
2021	Dynamic Pricing	f	Just a Game Stakes
2021	Ombudsman	c	Prince of Wales's Stakes (twice), International Stakes, Dubai Turf, Champion Stakes
2021	Ten Bob Tony	g	Queen Anne Stakes
2021	Estrange	f	Pretty Polly Stakes
2022	Desert Flower	f	1000 Guineas Stakes
2022	Portfolio Duration	f	New York Stakes
2023	Gewan	c	Dewhurst Stakes
2023	Bow Echo	c	2000 Guineas Stakes, St James's Palace Stakes, Sussex Stakes
2023	Miss Scott	f	Prix de l'Opera

== Pedigree ==
Pedigree of Night of Thunder (IRE), chestnut colt, 2011
Sire Dubawi (IRE) 2002	Dubai Millennium (GB); 1996	Seeking the Gold	Mr. Prospector
Sire Dubawi (IRE) 2002	Dubai Millennium (GB); 1996	Seeking the Gold	Con Game
Sire Dubawi (IRE) 2002	Dubai Millennium (GB); 1996	Colorado Dancer	Shareef Dancer
Sire Dubawi (IRE) 2002	Dubai Millennium (GB); 1996	Colorado Dancer	Fall Aspen
Sire Dubawi (IRE) 2002	Zomaradah (GB); 1995	Deploy	Shirley Heights
Sire Dubawi (IRE) 2002	Zomaradah (GB); 1995	Deploy	Slightly Dangerous
Sire Dubawi (IRE) 2002	Zomaradah (GB); 1995	Jawaher	Dancing Brave
Sire Dubawi (IRE) 2002	Zomaradah (GB); 1995	Jawaher	High Tern
Dam Forest Storm (GB) 2006	Galileo (IRE); 1998	Sadler's Wells	Northern Dancer
Dam Forest Storm (GB) 2006	Galileo (IRE); 1998	Sadler's Wells	Fairy Bridge
Dam Forest Storm (GB) 2006	Galileo (IRE); 1998	Urban Sea	Miswaki
Dam Forest Storm (GB) 2006	Galileo (IRE); 1998	Urban Sea	Allegretta
Dam Forest Storm (GB) 2006	Quiet Storm (IRE); 2000	Desert Prince	Green Desert
Dam Forest Storm (GB) 2006	Quiet Storm (IRE); 2000	Desert Prince	Flying Fairy
Dam Forest Storm (GB) 2006	Quiet Storm (IRE); 2000	Hertford Castle	Reference Point
Dam Forest Storm (GB) 2006	Quiet Storm (IRE); 2000	Hertford Castle	Forest Flower (Family: 2-n)
