= Kingston Hill (horse) =

British-bred Thoroughbred racehorse

- Racing silks of Paul Smith
- Sire: Mastercraftsman
- Grandsire: Danehill Dancer
- Dam: Audacieuse
- Damsire: Rainbow Quest
- Sex: Colt
- Foaled: 15 January 2011
- Country: Great Britain
- Colour: Grey
- Breeder: Ridgecourt Stud
- Owner: Paul Smith
- Trainer: Roger Varian
- Jockey: Andrea Atzeni
- Record: 8: 4-1-0
- Earnings: £866,362

Major wins
- Autumn Stakes (2013); Racing Post Trophy (2013); St Leger Stakes (2014)

Awards
- Cartier Champion Two-year-old Colt (2013)

Kingston Hill (foaled 15 January 2011) is a retired British Thoroughbred racehorse. As a two-year-old in 2013, he won all three of his races, including the Group 1 Racing Post Trophy. In 2014 he finished eighth in the 2000 Guineas and was then runner-up to Australia in the Derby before going on to win the Classic St. Leger Stakes. He was owned by Paul Smith and trained during his racing career by Roger Varian.

== Background ==
Kingston Hill is a grey colt bred by Ridgecourt Stud and foaled on 15 January 2011. He was one of the first crop of foals of Mastercraftsman, from whom he inherited his colour. Mastercraftsman's first crop also included graded winners The Grey Gatsby, Amazing Maria and Craftsman. As a two-year-old Mastercraftsman won the Group 1 Phoenix Stakes and National Stakes and was crowned Cartier Champion Two-year-old Colt in 2008. As a three-year-old he went on to record victories in the Irish 2,000 Guineas and St James's Palace Stakes before being retired to stud.

Kingston Hill's dam is Audacieuse, a daughter of Rainbow Quest. Audacieuse was trained by Élie Lellouche to win the Group 3 Prix de Flore in 2000. Kingston Hill was purchased by Charles Gordon-Watson for 70,000 guineas at Tattersalls October Yearlings Sale. He is owned by Paul Smith and trained by Roger Varian.

== Racing career ==
=== 2013: two-year-old season ===
Kingston Hill made his racecourse debut on 21 September 2013 in a seven-furlong maiden race at Newbury. He appeared to show his inexperience in the race, but readily beat odds-on favourite Exchequer by one and a half lengths. Three weeks later Kingston Hill was sent off at the odds of 15/2 in the Autumn Stakes at Newmarket. He was held up near the rear of the field in the early stages of the race, but progress through the pack to take the lead inside the final furlong, going on to win by two lengths from pre-race favourite Oklahoma City.

On 26 October, Kingston Hill was one of eleven horses to contest the Racing Post Trophy at Doncaster, after being supplemented for the race at a cost of £17,500. He was ridden by regular jockey Andrea Atzeni and started as the 7/2 favourite. Unlike in his previous race, Kingston Hill was positioned just behind the leaders after the start. He took the lead with over one furlong still to run and pulled clear to win by four and a half lengths from the Aidan O'Brien-trained colt Johann Strauss. After the race his odds were cut for the Derby and 2000 Guineas in 2014. Commenting on Kingston Hill's targets for the 2014 season, Varian said after the race "We'll have to see how he winters and what he's like in the spring. People have said he is a 10-furlong, mile-and-a-half horse, but he has the pace for a mile and travels so well... He has good acceleration and will be in everything. You've got to have an open book with him. We'll have a good eye on the Guineas. Whether he runs before or goes straight there or bypasses the Guineas we'll have to wait and see."

=== 2014: three-year-old season ===
On his first appearance as a three-year-old, Kingston Hill started at odds of 10/1 for the 2000 Guineas over the Rowley Mile course at Newmarket on 3 May. He was held up in the early stages and, despite making some progress in the final quarter mile, never threatened the leaders, finishing eighth behind Night of Thunder. On 7 June, Kington Hill started the 15/2 second favourite for the 235th running of the Derby over one and a half miles at Epsom Downs Racecourse. Atzeni positioned the colt just behind the leaders and turned into the straight in third place behind Our Channel and Kingfisher. He took the lead two furlongs from the finish but was overtaken by Australia a furlong out and finished second, beaten one and a quarter lengths, with Romsdal three and a quarter lengths back in third.

Kingston Hill was scheduled to renew his rivalry with Australia in the Irish Derby at the Curragh Racecourse three weeks later, but was withdrawn by Varian who felt that the ground at the Irish course was too firm. On 5 July, Kington Hill was matched against older horses for the first time in the Eclipse Stakes at Sandown Park Racecourse. Ridden by Frankie Dettori he was restrained in the early stages before making progress in the straight, but was unable to catch the leaders and finished fourth behind Mukhadram, beaten four lengths by the winner. It was expected that the colt would run next in the Great Voltigeur Stakes at York Racecourse, but as in Ireland, he was withdrawn on account of the firm ground.

On 13 September, Kingston Hill started 9/4 favourite for the St Leger at Doncaster, despite doubts about his ability to cope with the firm ground. His twelve opponents included Romsdal, Snow Sky (Gordon Stakes) and Hartnell (Queen's Vase). Atzeni restrained the colt towards the rear of the field before moving up on the outside to make his challenge in the straight. He made rapid progress to take the lead in the closing stages and won from Romsdal and Snow Sky. Kingston Hill hung left towards the rail as he made his challenge and appeared to impede the run of Snow Sky, but after a stewards' inquiry the result remained unaltered. Atzeni said "I rode him like the best horse in the race. He travelled brilliant and he is so laid back he just goes to sleep. When I pulled him out he was always going to get there." Varian, who, like Atzeni, was winning his first classic, indicated that the colt could now be aimed at the Prix de l'Arc de Triomphe.

On 5 October, Kingston Hill attempted to become the first St Leger winner to follow up in the Prix de l'Arc de Triomphe. He started at odds of 30/1, having been given an unfavourable draw on the far outside of the twenty runner field. The colt broke quickly and Atzeni tracked across to the inside to settle in second place behind the pacemaker Montviron. He remained among the leaders throughout the race and kept on well in the closing stages to finish fourth of the twenty runners behind Treve, Flintshire and Taghrooda.

=== 2015: four-year-old season ===
In March 2015 it was announced that Kingston Hill had sustained an injury to his left foreleg and would miss the first half of the season. In July Varian revealed that the colt had suffered a fresh injury to the same leg and was unlikely to race in 2015. On 18 September it was announced that the colt would not race again and would be retired to stand as a breeding stallion at the Coolmore Stud.

== Assessment and awards ==
At the end of the season Kingston Hill was voted Cartier Champion Two-year-old Colt. In the official ratings published in January 2014, Kingston Hill was rated the second-best European two-year-old of 2013, two pounds behind Toormore.

== Pedigree ==
Pedigree of Kingston Hill, grey colt, 2011
Sire Mastercraftsman (IRE) gr. 2006	Danehill Dancer (IRE) b. 1993	Danehill b. 1986	Danzig
Sire Mastercraftsman (IRE) gr. 2006	Danehill Dancer (IRE) b. 1993	Danehill b. 1986	Razyana
Sire Mastercraftsman (IRE) gr. 2006	Danehill Dancer (IRE) b. 1993	Mira Adonde b. 1986	Sharpen Up
Sire Mastercraftsman (IRE) gr. 2006	Danehill Dancer (IRE) b. 1993	Mira Adonde b. 1986	Lettre d'Amour
Sire Mastercraftsman (IRE) gr. 2006	Starlight Dreams (USA) gr. 1995	Black Tie Affair gr. 1986	Miswaki
Sire Mastercraftsman (IRE) gr. 2006	Starlight Dreams (USA) gr. 1995	Black Tie Affair gr. 1986	Hat Tab Girl
Sire Mastercraftsman (IRE) gr. 2006	Starlight Dreams (USA) gr. 1995	Reves Celestes b. 1979	Lyphard
Sire Mastercraftsman (IRE) gr. 2006	Starlight Dreams (USA) gr. 1995	Reves Celestes b. 1979	Tobira Celeste
Dam Audacieuse (GB) b. 1997	Rainbow Quest (USA) b. 1981	Blushing Groom ch. 1974	Red God
Dam Audacieuse (GB) b. 1997	Rainbow Quest (USA) b. 1981	Blushing Groom ch. 1974	Runaway Bride
Dam Audacieuse (GB) b. 1997	Rainbow Quest (USA) b. 1981	I Will Follow b. 1975	Herbager
Dam Audacieuse (GB) b. 1997	Rainbow Quest (USA) b. 1981	I Will Follow b. 1975	Where You Lead
Dam Audacieuse (GB) b. 1997	Sarah Georgina (IRE) b. 1987	Persian Bold br. 1975	Bold Lad
Dam Audacieuse (GB) b. 1997	Sarah Georgina (IRE) b. 1987	Persian Bold br. 1975	Relkarunner
Dam Audacieuse (GB) b. 1997	Sarah Georgina (IRE) b. 1987	Dance by Night ch. 1982	Northfields
Dam Audacieuse (GB) b. 1997	Sarah Georgina (IRE) b. 1987	Dance by Night ch. 1982	Elvina

Note: b. = Bay, br. = Brown, ch. = Chestnut, gr. = Grey
