= Variety Club (horse) =

South African Thoroughbred racehorse

- Sire: Var
- Grandsire: Forest Wildcat
- Dam: La Massine
- Damsire: Secret Prospector
- Sex: Stallion
- Foaled: 8 September 2008
- Country: South Africa
- Colour: Chestnut
- Breeder: Beaumont Stud
- Owner: Ingrid Jooste & Markus Jooste
- Trainer: Joey Ramsden; Mike de Kock
- Record: 23: 17-4-1

Major wins
- Langerman Stakes (2011); Cape Guineas (2012); KRA Guineas (2012); Winter Guineas (2012); Rising Sun Gold Challenge (2012, 2013); Queen's Plate (2013); Pinnacle Stakes (2013); Firebreak Stakes (2014); Godolphin Mile (2014); Champions Mile (2014)

Awards
- South African Horse of the Year (2012, 2013)

Variety Club (foaled 8 September 2008) is a South African Thoroughbred racehorse. Racing in his native country, the horse won numerous major races including the Cape Guineas, the Queen's Plate and two editions of the Rising Sun Gold Challenge. He was voted South African Horse of the Year in both 2012 and 2013. After a complicated and protracted quarantine procedure he was allowed to compete internationally and established himself as one of the best horses in the world in 2014 with wins in the Godolphin Mile in Dubai and the Champions Mile in Hong Kong. He was retired from racing in autumn 2014 to become a breeding stallion in South Africa.

== Background ==
Variety Club is a chestnut horse with a white star and three white socks bred in South Africa by the Beaumont Stud. He was sired by Var, a horse who raced with limited success but improved after being transferred to Europe where he won the Prix de l'Abbaye in 2004. He later became a very successful sire of winners in South Africa. Variety Club's dam La Massine was a granddaughter of the South African Oaks winner Novenna, herself a descendant of the Hungarian mare Pompea who produced the Prix de l'Arc de Triomphe winner Crapom. During his racing career, Variety Club was owned by Ingrid & Markus Jooste. He was sent into training with Joey Ramsden and was ridden in all of his major races by Anton Marcus.

== Racing career ==
=== 2010/2011: two-year-old season ===
Racing as a two-year-old, Variety Club won the Langerman Stakes over 1500 metres at Kenilworth and finished second in the Champion Juvenile Cup at Fairview.

=== 2011/2012: three-year-old season ===
As a three-year-old, Variety Club finished second in the weight-for-age Queen's Plate and won the Cape Guineas before finishing second to Jackson when moved up in distance for the Cape Derby over 2000 metres on 28 January. In April he won the Winter Guineas over 1600 metres at Kenilworth by two and a quarter lengths at odds of 1/5. In June he became the first three-year-old for 11 years to win the weight-for-age Rising Sun Gold Challenge at Clairwood Racecourse. Variety Club sustained a burst blood vessel in the race, which Ramsden believed was caused by dust in the racecourse stables. His other wins that season included the Selangor Cup, the KRA Guineas and the Matchem Stakes.

=== 2012/2013: four-year-old season ===
As a four-year-old, Variety Club won the Green Point Stakes and started favourite for the Queen's Plate at Kenilworth in January. Drawn on the far outside he delayed proceedings by backing out of the stalls at the last moment and causing a false start. When the race finally started he took the lead immediately and maintained his advantage throughout, winning by two and a quarter lengths and a short head from Jackson and Pomodoro. After a break he returned to win the Pinnacle Stakes at Greyville Racecourse in May. In June, Variety Club recorded his eighth consecutive success when repeating his 2012 victory in the Rising Sun Gold Challenge, leading from the start and beating the filly Beach Beauty by a length. After the race Marcus said "Because of his high cruising speed I led more by accident than design but I think he would be even more effective against better opposition".

At the end of the South African season Variety Club went into quarantine, firstly in Mauritius and then in the United Kingdom to prepare for an international campaign in 2014. The extended quarantine period was considered necessary as many countries feared the importation of the African horse sickness virus.

=== 2013/2014: five-year-old season ===
In early 2014, Variety Club was campaigned in the United Arab Emirates and contested three races on the Tapeta surface at Meydan Racecourse in Dubai. In the Group 3 Firebreak Stakes over 1600 metres on 13 February he started favourite against eight opponents. He took the lead soon after the start and accelerated clear of his opponents in the straight to win "comfortably" by two lengths from Haatheq. In the Burj Nahaar over the same distance on 8 March he took the lead in the straight but was overtaken in the closing stages and was beaten one and three quarter lengths by the Godolphin filly Shuruq. Three weeks later Variety Club was one of fifteen runners to contest the 21st running of the Godolphin Mile and started the 11/2 third favourite behind his fellow South African Soft Falling Rain (winner of the race in 2013) and Shuruq. He took the lead soon after the start and stayed on well in the straight to win by a length from Soft Falling Rain, with Flotilla (Breeders' Cup Juvenile Fillies Turf, Poule d'Essai des Pouliches) in third. After the race Ramsden said "It is fantastic for a horse to come all the way from South Africa – to compete, let alone win, is very special. Anton did a most magical job. He was lucky he got quite a soft lead, I was very surprised that there wasn't more pressure", whilst Anton Marcus said "I wanted to make it a test of stamina. I still believe he will be better on turf. He is my horse but he really belongs to the whole of South Africa."

Shortly after his win in the Godolphin Mile, Variety Club was transferred to the stable of Mike de Kock. Derek Brugman, the racing manager of the horse's owners said "There is nothing sinister in the move. It will just allow Joey to concentrate on his local string. Joey will also continue to benefit financially from Variety Club's success as much as he would have done as the trainer". The horse was then sent to Hong Kong to contest the Champions Mile at Sha Tin Racecourse on 4 May. He started at odds of 11.6/1 in a field of fourteen which included Able Friend, Gold-Fun, California Memory, Glorious Days, Blazing Speed (Stewards' Cup), Dan Excel (winner of the race in 2013) and the Irish raider Gordon Lord Byron (Prix de la Forêt, Haydock Sprint Cup, George Ryder Stakes). He started quickly from an outside draw and led for the first 400 metres before settling in second place behind Helene Spirit. Variety Club took the lead in the straight and drew away from his rival to win by four lengths from Able Friend with Dan Excel a length and a quarter away in third ahead of Glorious Days and Gold-Fun. After the race, de Kock said "It's huge for us, it's huge for South Africa, it's fantastic for South African breeding" whilst Marcus commented "He's just an absolute professional and I'm merely a pilot".

On a flight to Europe after his win in Hong Kong, the horse became extremely aggressive and had to be sedated several times. His behavioural problems intensified at his British training base and plans to run the horse in the Prix de la Forêt at Longchamp Racecourse in October were abandoned. He was retired from racing and returned to South Africa to begin his breeding career at Klawervlei Stud. Variety Club proved to be infertile at stud and was later returned to his trainers yard where he was reported in 2018 to be enjoying retirement in his old stall.

Racing Record
Age	Starts	Wins	2nds	3rds	Year
At 2	6	3	1	1	2011
At 3	8	6	2	0	2011/12
At 4	5	5	0	0	2012/13
At 6	4	3	1	0	2014
	23	17	4	1	2011–14

== Awards and assessment ==
At the Equus Awards in August 2012, Variety Club was named champion three-year-old colt, champion middle-distance horse and South African Horse of the Year. His trainer Joey Ramsden said "He was great throughout the season and very consistent and that is what has made him special". In 2013, Variety Club was again voted South African Horse of the Year at the Equus Awards, and was also named champion miler and champion older male.

In the 2012 edition on the World Thoroughbred Racehorse Rankings he was rated 119lbs, the 74th best racehorse in the world, 21 pounds behind the top-rated Frankel. In the following year he was rated 120lbs, 47th, ten pounds behind Black Caviar and Treve. In the 2014 World's Best Racehorse Rankings, Variety Club was rated the third-best horse to race anywhere in the world at 127lbs behind the Japanese horses Just A Way and Epiphaneia and level with Able Friend, Australia, Kingman and The Grey Gatsby.

Timeform rated Variety Club in 2014 as equal 2nd best horse racing worldwide during that year at 131lbs, which is 16lbs behind the highest ever rating accorded to Frankel in 2012. In the same year Racing Post rated him at 124lbs which is 16lbs behind their highest ever rating accorded to Frankel in 2012. Both Timeform and Racing Post only started rating South African raced racehorses after 2000 and Variety Club is the highest rated South African bred racehorse so far. He remains in 2020 as the highest ever rated South African racehorse by Timeform and in the Longines World Best Racehorse Rankings

== Pedigree ==
Pedigree of Variety Club (SAF), chestnut stallion, 2008
Sire Var (USA) 1999	Forest Wildcat (USA); 1991	Storm Cat	Storm Bird
Sire Var (USA) 1999	Forest Wildcat (USA); 1991	Storm Cat	Terlingua
Sire Var (USA) 1999	Forest Wildcat (USA); 1991	Victoria Beauty	Bold Native
Sire Var (USA) 1999	Forest Wildcat (USA); 1991	Victoria Beauty	Abifaith
Sire Var (USA) 1999	Loma Preata (USA); 1994	Zilzal	Nureyev
Sire Var (USA) 1999	Loma Preata (USA); 1994	Zilzal	French Charmer
Sire Var (USA) 1999	Loma Preata (USA); 1994	Halleys Comeback	Key To The Kingdom
Sire Var (USA) 1999	Loma Preata (USA); 1994	Halleys Comeback	Promised Princess
Dam La Massine (SAF) 1992	Secret Prospector (USA); 1982	Mr. Prospector	Raise a Native
Dam La Massine (SAF) 1992	Secret Prospector (USA); 1982	Mr. Prospector	Gold Digger
Dam La Massine (SAF) 1992	Secret Prospector (USA); 1982	Secret Asset	Graustark
Dam La Massine (SAF) 1992	Secret Prospector (USA); 1982	Secret Asset	Numbered Account
Dam La Massine (SAF) 1992	Karpakova (SAF); 1986	Northern Guest	Northern Dancer
Dam La Massine (SAF) 1992	Karpakova (SAF); 1986	Northern Guest	Sex Appeal
Dam La Massine (SAF) 1992	Karpakova (SAF); 1986	Novenna	Hobnob
Dam La Massine (SAF) 1992	Karpakova (SAF); 1986	Novenna	Fidelis (Family 1-j)
