= Telescope (horse) =

Irish-bred Thoroughbred racehorse

- Racing silks of Highclere Thoroughbred Racing
- Sire: Galileo
- Grandsire: Sadler's Wells
- Dam: Velouette
- Damsire: Darshaan
- Sex: Colt
- Foaled: 25 January 2010
- Country: Ireland
- Colour: Bay
- Breeder: Barronstown Stud
- Owner: Highclere Thoroughbred Racing -Wavertree
- Trainer: Michael Stoute
- Record: 14: 5–6–1
- Earnings: £763,293

Major wins
- Great Voltigeur Stakes (2013); Hardwicke Stakes (2014); Aston Park Stakes (2015)

Telescope (foaled 25 January 2010) is an Irish-bred, British-trained Thoroughbred racehorse. He won one minor race as a two-year-old but was highly regarded by his connections and was considered a leading contender for the following year's Epsom Derby. His three-year-old campaign was severely restricted by injury, but he won two of his three races, including the Great Voltigeur Stakes. At four, he was beaten in his first two races before recording an impressive seven-length win in the Hardwicke Stakes at Royal Ascot. He added a win in the Aston Park Stakes in 2015 before his racing career was ended by injury. Apart from his wins, he finished second in the King George VI and Queen Elizabeth Stakes, third in the International Stakes and fourth in the Breeders' Cup Turf.

== Background ==
Telescope is a bay horse with a large white star bred in Ireland by the Barronstown Stud. He was sired by Galileo the winner of the 2001 Derby who went on to become an outstanding breeding stallion, winning the title of champion sire on five occasions. Galileo's other progeny include Rip Van Winkle, Nathaniel, Cape Blanco, New Approach and Frankel. His dam, Velouette was an unraced daughter of the Lowther Stakes winner Velvet Moon, a mare whose other progeny included Moon Ballad. Velvet Moon was a half-sister of Central Park who won the Derby Italiano and finished second in the Melbourne Cup and was related to the Prix Royal Oak winner Braashee.

== Racing career ==
=== 2012: two-year-old season ===
On his first racecourse appearance, Telescope, ridden by Richard Mullen, started the 4/1 favourite for a seventeen-runner maiden race over seven furlongs at Ascot Racecourse. He was restrained towards the back of the field before making progress in the final quarter mile but was beaten a short head by Snow King after Mullen dropped his whip 50 yards from the finish. Nineteen days later he started 8/13 favourite against eight opponents in a maiden race over the Rowley mile at Newmarket in which he was ridden by Richard Hughes. As on his debut, he pulled hard against his jockey's attempts to restrain him before moving up to take the lead a furlong from the finish. He won comfortably by two and a quarter lengths from Elkaayed without Hughes having to use his whip.

=== 2013: three-year-old season ===
Telescope was regarded as a leading contender for the 2013 Epsom Derby but suffered from a series of leg injuries and did not contest the race. He missed an intended run in the Dante Stakes and was withdrawn from the Derby field after performing unimpressively in a racecourse gallop at Lingfield Park Racecourse. He made a belated seasonal debut on 18 July in a minor race over ten furlongs at Leicester Racecourse in which he was ridden by Ryan Moore and started the 1/2 favourite against two opponents. The colt led in the early stages, before being headed by Centurius, but regained the lead three furlongs from the finish and drew away to win by twenty-four lengths. On 10 August, Telescope was matched against older horses for the first time when he started 4/9 favourite for the Group Three Rose of Lancaster Stakes at Haydock Park Racecourse. Telescope and Ryan Moore tracked the leaders before making a challenge in the straight but was beaten a length by the four-year-old David Livingston with Noble Mission a head away in third place. In the Group Two Great Voltigeur Stakes at York Racecourse eleven days later, Telescope started 5/4 favourite against six opponents including the Gordon Stakes winner Cap o'Rushes and the Aidan O'Brien-trained Foundry. The colt tracked the leaders before taking the lead two furlongs from the finish and winning by 1 1/4 lengths from Foundry with the Godolphin colt Secret Number in third. After the race, Telescope was made the ante-post favourite for the St Leger Stakes but was withdrawn from the race after doubts were expressed about his ability to stay the distance. He missed an alternative engagement in the Champion Stakes and did not race again in 2013.

=== 2014: four-year-old season ===
On his first appearance as a four-year-old, Telescope contested the Group Three Gordon Richards Stakes over ten furlongs at Sandown Park Racecourse on 25 April in which he finished second, proving no match for Noble Mission, who won by nine lengths. He faced Noble Mission again in the Huxley Stakes over a similar distance at Chester Racecourse on 8 May, and was beaten 2 1/4 lengths by the Lady Cecil-trained five-year-old, who was conceding three pounds. On 21 June at Royal Ascot, Telescope was moved back up in distance for the Group Two Hardwicke Stakes over 1 1/2 miles. After racing just behind the leaders Telescope took the lead a quarter of a mile from the finish and went clear of his opponents to win impressively by seven lengths from his stable companion Hillstar. Despite never having previously competed at Group One level, Telescope started 5/2 favourite for Britain's most prestigious weight-for-age race the King George VI and Queen Elizabeth Stakes over the same course and distance as the Hardwicke on 26 July. He raced in third palace before moving forward to challenge for the lead in the straight. He got the better of a protracted struggle with the five-year-old Mukhadram but was unable to hold the late run of the filly Taghrooda and finished second, three lengths behind the winner. Highclere's leader Harry Herbert said "It went according to plan... Our horse has run a cracking race... There's plenty to look forward to".

On 20 August Telescope was brought back in distance to face the Derby winner Australia as well as Mukhadram and the Prix du Jockey Club winner The Grey Gatsby in the International Stakes over 10 1/2 furlongs at York. He tracked the leaders in fourth place before moving forward to challenge for the lead in the straight, but was outpaced in the closing stages and finished third, beaten two lengths and 2 1/4 lengths by Australia and The Grey Gatsby. On 1 November, Telescope started the 8/5 favourite for the Breeders' Cup Turf at Santa Anita Park. After racing just behind the leaders he moved up on the inside on the final turn and took a narrow advantage early in the straight. He was overtaken in the closing stages and finished fourth of the twelve runners behind Main Sequence, Flintshire and Twilight Eclipse. Stoute commented "He's run a good race, but the race wasn't really run to suit him. He needs to be able to do it one long progression. He's a long striding horse for a track like this."

=== 2015: five-year-old season ===
Telescope began his 2015 season in the Jockey Club Stakes at Newmarket on 2 May. Starting the odds-on favourite he went clear of the field in the last quarter mile but was worn down in the closing stages and beaten a head by the four-year-old gelding Second Step. He was dropped in class for the Listed Aston Park Stakes at Newbury two weeks later and won easily by six lengths at odds of 8/13. In June he attempted to repeat his 2014 success in the Hardwicke Stakes. He started 6/4 favourite, but having raced in second place until the final furlong he weakened badly and finished sixth of the eight runners behind Snow Sky. He was being prepared for a second run in the King George when he sustained a tendon injury. His retirement from racing was announced on 31 August.

== Pedigree ==
Pedigree of Telescope (IRE), bay colt, 2010
Sire Galileo (IRE) 1998	Sadler's Wells (USA); 1981	Northern Dancer	Nearctic
Sire Galileo (IRE) 1998	Sadler's Wells (USA); 1981	Northern Dancer	Natalma
Sire Galileo (IRE) 1998	Sadler's Wells (USA); 1981	Fairy Bridge	Bold Reason
Sire Galileo (IRE) 1998	Sadler's Wells (USA); 1981	Fairy Bridge	Special
Sire Galileo (IRE) 1998	Urban Sea (USA); 1989	Miswaki	Mr. Prospector
Sire Galileo (IRE) 1998	Urban Sea (USA); 1989	Miswaki	Hopespringseternal
Sire Galileo (IRE) 1998	Urban Sea (USA); 1989	Allegretta	Lombard
Sire Galileo (IRE) 1998	Urban Sea (USA); 1989	Allegretta	Anatevka
Dam Velouette (GB) 2000	Darshaan (GB); 1981	Shirley Heights	Mill Reef
Dam Velouette (GB) 2000	Darshaan (GB); 1981	Shirley Heights	Hardiemma
Dam Velouette (GB) 2000	Darshaan (GB); 1981	Delsy	Abdos
Dam Velouette (GB) 2000	Darshaan (GB); 1981	Delsy	Kelty
Dam Velouette (GB) 2000	Velvet Moon (IRE); 1991	Shaadi	Danzig
Dam Velouette (GB) 2000	Velvet Moon (IRE); 1991	Shaadi	Unfurled
Dam Velouette (GB) 2000	Velvet Moon (IRE); 1991	Park Special	Relkino
Dam Velouette (GB) 2000	Velvet Moon (IRE); 1991	Park Special	Balilla (Family 4-k)
