= Taghrooda =

British-bred Thoroughbred racehorse

- Racing colours of Hamdan Al Maktoum
- Sire: Sea The Stars
- Grandsire: Cape Cross
- Dam: Ezima
- Damsire: Sadler's Wells
- Sex: Mare
- Foaled: 27 January 2011
- Country: United Kingdom
- Colour: Bay
- Breeder: Shadwell Stud
- Owner: Hamdan Al Maktoum
- Trainer: John Gosden
- Record: 6: 4-1-1
- Earnings: £1,476,101

Major wins
- Pretty Polly Stakes (2014); Oaks Stakes (2014); King George VI and Queen Elizabeth Stakes (2014)

Awards
- Cartier Champion Three-year-old Filly (2014); World's top-rated three-year-old filly (2014)

Taghrooda (foaled 27 January 2011) is an Irish bred British trained Thoroughbred racehorse. In 2014 she won the classic Oaks Stakes and went on to win Britain's premier weight-for-age race, the King George VI and Queen Elizabeth Stakes. She subsequently finished second in the Yorkshire Oaks and third in the Prix de l'Arc de Triomphe before being retired at the end of the season.

== Background ==
Taghrooda is a bay mare bred by her owner Hamdan Al Maktoum's Shadwell Stud. She is from the first crop of foals sired by Sea The Stars. Taghrooda's dam Ezima was a successful stayer who won four races including the Saval Beg Stakes. As a descendant of the broodmare Evisa, Ezima was closely related to the Ascot Gold Cup winners Enzeli and Estimate as well as the Irish Oaks winner Ebadiyla and a more distant relative of Darshaan, Sinndar, Acamas and Akiyda. Taghrooda's name is a reference to form of chanted poetry used by the Bedouins of Oman and the United Arab Emirates. The filly was sent into training with John Gosden at his Clarehaven Stable at Newmarket.

== Racing career ==
=== 2013: two-year-old season ===
On her only appearance as a two-year-old, Taghrooda started a 20/1 outsider for a maiden race over one mile at Newmarket Racecourse on 21 September. Ridden by Dane O'Neill, she was towards the rear of the fourteen runner field in the early stages before making good progress to take the lead a furlong from the finish and won by a neck from the favourite Casual Smile.

=== 2014: three-year-old season ===
On her first appearance of 2014, Taghrooda was ridden by Paul Hanagan and started favourite for the Listed Pretty Polly Stakes over ten furlongs at Newmarket on 4 May. She took the lead approaching the final furlong and drew clear of her opponents in the closing stages to win by six lengths from Jordan Princess. After the race she was promoted to favouritism for The Oaks. Hanagan said "she gave me a lot of confidence, she's just got a bit about her. Stepping up to a mile and a half will be fine, she's very uncomplicated". The Racing Post described her performance as "breathtaking".

On 6 June 2014, Taghrooda started the 5/1 third favourite, in a field of seventeen fillies, for the 236th running of the Oaks Stakes at Epsom Downs Racecourse. She raced just behind the leaders before moving into contention in the straight. She took the lead with two furlongs to run, went clear of the field and won by three and three quarter lengths from Tarfasha. The winning jockey Paul Hanagan said that the race "went like clockwork. I'd been planning it like that for about a month in my head".

Taghrooda was expected to run next in the Irish Oaks at the Curragh Racecourse on 20 July and was ante-post favourite for the race. On 17 July, however, it was announced that the filly would be rerouted to contest Britain's most prestigious weight-for-age race, the King George VI and Queen Elizabeth Stakes at Ascot Racecourse on 26 July. Hamdan Al Maktoum's racing manager Angus Gold said "I think Sheikh Hamdan wanted to give her a chance in the big one as she will be retiring at the end of this year... he just felt this filly is not going to have too many more races and deserved a chance". In the build-up to the Ascot race Gold issued another positive bulletin saying "Everything has gone very well with Taghrooda, she's been working very well and looks fantastic. She seems very happy in herself mentally".

In the King George, ridden as usual by Hanagan, Taghrooda started the 7/2 second favourite behind Telescope in an eight-runner field which included Magician, Mukhadram and Trading Leather as well as her stable companions Eagle Top (King Edward VII Stakes) and Romsdal (third in The Derby). Hanagan restrained the filly towards the back of the field in the early stages, as Leitir Mor set a fast pace. She made steady progress approaching the final turn and made her challenge on the outside in the straight. Inside the final furlong Taghrooda overtook Telescope and Mukhadram, who had been battling for the lead, and accelerated clear to win by three lengths. She became the first British-trained three-year-old filly to win the race. She was also the first British-trained female winner since the four-year-old Time Charter in 1983 and the first three-year-old filly to succeed since the French-trained Pawneese in 1976. After the race Hanagan said "It’s amazing and that just caps it all off. The reception she is getting is just out of this world". Gosden commented "I think to go to the Irish Oaks off a win at Epsom would have been a defensive move and it was bold of [Hamdan Al Maktoum] and correct". Angus Gold said "She’s blessed with this extraordinary temperament, which very few fillies of that age have. She just never turns a hair".

Taghrooda's next race was the Yorkshire Oaks over one and half miles at York Racecourse 21 August. Apparently facing much weaker opposition than in her previous race and started at odds of 1/5 against six opponents headed by Tapestry, an Aidan O'Brien-trained filly who had finished second in the Irish Oaks. Hanaghan settled the filly in fifth place before moving up on the turn into the straight and taking the lead approaching the final quarter mile. A furlong out, however, she was joined by Tapestry and after a prolonged struggle it was the Irish-trained filly who prevailed by a neck. After the race, Hanaghan said "I don't think there were many excuses, she was just beaten by a very good horse".

On 5 October, Taghrooda started the 11/2 favourite for France's most prestigious race, the Prix de l'Arc de Triomphe over 2400 metres at Longchamp Racecourse despite being given an unfavourable draw. She raced on the outside before making her challenge in the straight, staying on in the closing stages to finish third of the twenty runners, beaten two lengths and one and a quarter lengths by Treve and Flintshire. Eight days later it was announced that Taghrooda would be retired from racing to become a broodmare. Gold said "She has been wonderful and will be missed. In my time not since Salsabil have we had a filly this good, which shows how rare they are".

== Breeding record ==
Taghrooda has produced three named foals as of 2021.

- Jahafil, a bay filly, foaled in 2016, sired by Kingman. Unraced.
- Almighwar, bay colt, 2017, by Dubawi. Won two races.
- Israr, bay colt, 2019, by Muhaarar. Has won three races including the G2 Princess of Wales's Stakes.

== Assessment and awards ==
In November Taghrooda was named Champion Three-year-old Filly at the Cartier Racing Awards.

In the 2014 World's Best Racehorse Rankings, Taghrooda was rated the eighteenth best horse to race anywhere in the world in 2014 and was the top-rated three-year-old filly, three pounds ahead of Tapestry and four ahead of the American champion Untapable.

== Pedigree ==
Pedigree of Taghrooda (GB), bay mare, 2011
Sire Sea The Stars (IRE) 2006	Cape Cross (IRE); 1994	Green Desert	Danzig
Sire Sea The Stars (IRE) 2006	Cape Cross (IRE); 1994	Green Desert	Foreign Courier
Sire Sea The Stars (IRE) 2006	Cape Cross (IRE); 1994	Park Appeal	Ahonoora
Sire Sea The Stars (IRE) 2006	Cape Cross (IRE); 1994	Park Appeal	Balidaress
Sire Sea The Stars (IRE) 2006	Urban Sea (USA); 1989	Miswaki	Mr. Prospector
Sire Sea The Stars (IRE) 2006	Urban Sea (USA); 1989	Miswaki	Hopespringseternal
Sire Sea The Stars (IRE) 2006	Urban Sea (USA); 1989	Allegretta	Lombard
Sire Sea The Stars (IRE) 2006	Urban Sea (USA); 1989	Allegretta	Anatevka
Dam Ezima (IRE) 2004	Sadler's Wells (USA); 1981	Northern Dancer	Nearctic
Dam Ezima (IRE) 2004	Sadler's Wells (USA); 1981	Northern Dancer	Natalma
Dam Ezima (IRE) 2004	Sadler's Wells (USA); 1981	Fairy Bridge	Bold Reason
Dam Ezima (IRE) 2004	Sadler's Wells (USA); 1981	Fairy Bridge	Special
Dam Ezima (IRE) 2004	Ezilla (IRE); 1997	Darshaan	Shirley Heights
Dam Ezima (IRE) 2004	Ezilla (IRE); 1997	Darshaan	Delsy
Dam Ezima (IRE) 2004	Ezilla (IRE); 1997	Ezana	Ela-Mana-Mou
Dam Ezima (IRE) 2004	Ezilla (IRE); 1997	Ezana	Evisa (Family 13-c)
