= Magician (horse) =

Irish-bred Thoroughbred racehorse

- Racing colours of Michael Tabor
- Sire: Galileo
- Grandsire: Sadler's Wells
- Dam: Absolutelyfabulous
- Damsire: Mozart
- Sex: Colt
- Foaled: 24 April 2010
- Country: Ireland
- Colour: Bay
- Breeder: Absolutelyfabulous Syndicate
- Owner: Mrs John Magnier; Michael Tabor; Derrick Smith
- Trainer: Aidan O'Brien
- Record: 14: 5-4-0
- Earnings: £1,579,292

Major wins
- Dee Stakes (2013); Irish 2000 Guineas (2013); Breeders' Cup Turf (2013); Mooresbridge Stakes (2014)

Awards
- Cartier Champion Three-year-old Colt (2013)

Magician (foaled 24 April 2010) is an Irish Thoroughbred racehorse. After showing unremarkable form as a two-year-old in 2012, he established himself as a top-class performer in May 2013 with wins in the Dee Stakes and the Irish 2000 Guineas. After a long break, he returned in November to win the Breeders' Cup Turf and a month later was voted Cartier Champion Three-year-old Colt.

== Background ==
Magician is a bay colt with a white star bred in Ireland by the Absolutelyfabulous Syndicate, an organisation associated with the Coolmore Stud. He was sired by Galileo the winner of the 2001 Derby who went on to become an outstanding breeding stallion, winning the title of champion sire on four occasions. Galileo's other progeny include Rip Van Winkle, Nathaniel, Cape Blanco, New Approach and Frankel. Magician's dam, Absolutelyfabulous was a successful sprinter who won the Listed Cork Stakes and finished second in the Ballyogan Stakes. Absolutelyfabulous is a great-granddaughter of Luv Luvin', an American broodmare whose other descendants include Henrythenavigator and the Irish 2000 Guineas winner Saffron Walden.

Magician was trained throughout his racing career by Aidan O'Brien at Ballydoyle.

== Racing career ==
=== 2012: two-year-old season ===
Magician began his racing career in a seven furlong maiden race at Leopardstown Racecourse on 8 September. Ridden by Seamie Heffernan he started at odds of 10/1 and finished ninth of the sixteen runners behind Mooqtar. Nineteen days later he ran in a similar event at Dundalk and was ridden by his trainer's son Joseph O'Brien to finish second, half a length behind the Dermot Weld-trained favourite Mouteab. Joseph O'Brien rode the colt again when he started 4/5 favourite for a maiden race at the Curragh on 14 October. Racing over a mile on heavy ground, Magician took the lead inside the final quarter mile and drew clear of his opponents in the closing stages to win by six lengths from Bunairgead. Two weeks later, Magician was moved up in class to contest the Group Three Killavullan Stakes over seven furlongs at Leopardstown. Seamie Heffernan sent the colt into an early lead, but after being overtaken, and then badly hampered in the straight, Magician was eased down to finish last of the seven runners behind Big Break.

=== 2013: three-year-old season ===
On his first appearance of 2013, Magician was sent to the United Kingdom on 10 May to contest the Dee Stakes at Chester Racecourse, a race regarded as a trial for The Derby. Ridden by Ryan Moore, he started the 13/8 favourite for the nine furlong race against four British-trained opponents. Magician tracked the leader Gabrial's Kaka before moving to the outside in the straight, taking the lead, and pulling clear to win by four lengths from Contributor. After the race Moore described him as "a very nice horse... he really quickened very well." Magician's win saw him enter the ante-post betting for the Derby, with bookmakers offering him at odds of 14/1. Fifteen days after his win at Chester, Magician started the 100/30 second favourite for the Irish 2000 Guineas at the Curragh, with the Richard Hannon Sr.-trained Van der Neer heading the betting after finishing third to Dawn Approach in the English 2000 Guineas at Newmarket. Ridden by Joseph O'Brien, Magician was settled just behind the leaders before moving to the front approaching the final furlong. In the closing stages he accelerated clear of the field and won "comfortably" by three and a half lengths from his stable companion Gale Force Ten. Magician's Derby odds were cut to 6/1 after the race, but Coolmore's owner John Magnier declined to commit the horse to the race, saying that he had "all kinds of options."

Magician did not contest the Derby (won by his stable companion Ruler of the World), but was instead aimed at the St James's Palace Stakes at Royal Ascot. He started the 5/2 second favourite behind the 2000 Guineas winner Dawn Approach but was badly hampered early in the straight and finished last of the nine runners after being eased down in the closing stages.

Magician was off the course for four and a half months before his next start, the Breeders' Cup Turf at Santa Anita Park on 2 November. The colt was matched against older horses for the first time and tested over one and a half miles, three furlongs further than he had run before. Ridden by Ryan Moore, he was held up at the back of the field before producing a strong run in the straight to win by half a length from The Fugue.

In November, Magician was voted Champion Three-year-old Colt at the Cartier Racing Awards.

=== 2014: four-year-old season ===
On his four-year-old debut, Magician started the 5/2 favourite for the Dubai Sheema Classic at Meydan Racecourse on 29 March 2014. Ridden by Joseph O'Brien, he never looked likely to win but stayed on in the closing stages to finish sixth of the fifteen runner behind the Japanese mare Gentildonna. He recorded his first win of the season in the Mooresbridge Stakes at the Curragh on 5 May beating Parish Hall by a neck at odds of 2/13. Magician returned to Group One class on 25 May, when he started joint favourite for the Tatteralls Gold Cup at the Curragh. He made some progress in the straight but was never able to reach the lead and finished second, a length and a quarter behind Noble Mission. At Royal Ascot in June Magician started at odds of 6/1 for the Prince of Wales's Stakes, a race which attracted a very strong field including Treve, The Fugue, Mukhadram and Dank. The colt was among the leaders from the start and took the lead in the straight, but was overtaken approaching the final furlong by The Fugue. He held on to take second place, one and three quarter lengths behind the winner and a length ahead of Treve. Magician started at odds of 9/2 for Britain's most prestigious weight-for-age race the King George VI and Queen Elizabeth Stakes at Ascot on 26 July but ran poorly and finished sixth of the eight runners, beaten fourteen lengths by the winner Taghrooda.

In August the colt was sent to the United States to contest the thirty-second running of the Arlington Million and was made favourite at odds of 9/5. With no obvious front-runners in the race, Joseph O'Brien opted to employ new tactics as he disputed the lead from the start. He gained a narrow advantage in the straight but was caught 75 yards from the wire and beaten by the 11.5/1 outsider Hardest Core. Magician returned to America to defend the Breeders' Cup Turf, but was withdrawn three days before the race after returning from exercise lame in his right foreleg.

== Assessment ==
In the 2013 World's Best Racehorse Rankings Magician was rated the eleventh best racehorse in the world and the third best three-year-old colt behind Olympic Glory and Toronado. He was also the highest-rated three-year-old to win a race in North America.

== Pedigree ==
Pedigree of Magician (IRE), bay colt, 2010
Sire Galileo (IRE) 1998	Sadler's Wells (USA); 1981	Northern Dancer	Nearctic
Sire Galileo (IRE) 1998	Sadler's Wells (USA); 1981	Northern Dancer	Natalma
Sire Galileo (IRE) 1998	Sadler's Wells (USA); 1981	Fairy Bridge	Bold Reason
Sire Galileo (IRE) 1998	Sadler's Wells (USA); 1981	Fairy Bridge	Special
Sire Galileo (IRE) 1998	Urban Sea (USA) ch. 1989	Miswaki	Mr. Prospector
Sire Galileo (IRE) 1998	Urban Sea (USA) ch. 1989	Miswaki	Hopespringseternal
Sire Galileo (IRE) 1998	Urban Sea (USA) ch. 1989	Allegretta	Lombard
Sire Galileo (IRE) 1998	Urban Sea (USA) ch. 1989	Allegretta	Anatevka
Dam Absolutelyfabulous (IRE) 2003	Mozart (IRE); 1998	Danehill	Danzig
Dam Absolutelyfabulous (IRE) 2003	Mozart (IRE); 1998	Danehill	Razyana
Dam Absolutelyfabulous (IRE) 2003	Mozart (IRE); 1998	Victoria Cross	Spectacular Bid
Dam Absolutelyfabulous (IRE) 2003	Mozart (IRE); 1998	Victoria Cross	Glowing Tribute
Dam Absolutelyfabulous (IRE) 2003	Lady Windermere (IRE); 1997	Lake Coniston	Bluebird
Dam Absolutelyfabulous (IRE) 2003	Lady Windermere (IRE); 1997	Lake Coniston	Persian Polly
Dam Absolutelyfabulous (IRE) 2003	Lady Windermere (IRE); 1997	Brigid	Irish River
Dam Absolutelyfabulous (IRE) 2003	Lady Windermere (IRE); 1997	Brigid	Luv Luvin' (Family 9-b)
