= Akeed Mofeed =

British-bred Thoroughbred racehorse

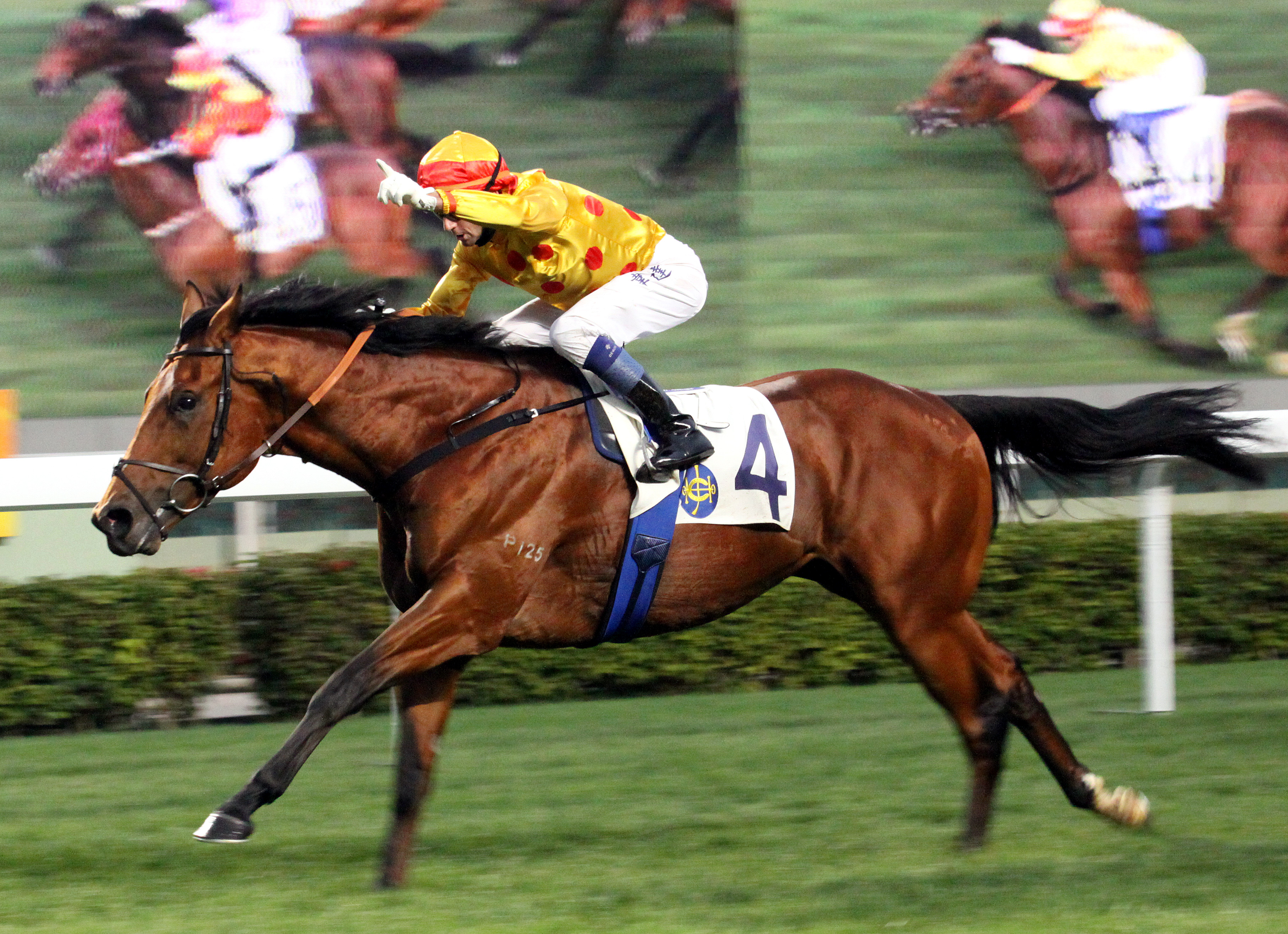
- Sire: Dubawi
- Grandsire: Dubai Millennium
- Dam: Wonder Why
- Damsire: Tiger Hill
- Sex: Stallion
- Foaled: 14 February 2009
- Country: Great Britain
- Colour: Bay
- Breeder: Rabbah Bloodstock Limited
- Owner: Jaber Abdullah (Ireland); Pan Sutong (Hong Kong)
- Trainer: John Oxx (Ireland); Richard Gibson (Hong Kong)
- Record: 17: 6-2-1
- Earnings: €2,680,074; HK$28,642,450

Major wins
- Hong Kong Derby (2013); Hong Kong Cup (2013)
- Last updated on April 1, 2014

Akeed Mofeed (事事為王; foaled 14 February 2009) is a Thoroughbred racehorse trained in Ireland by John Oxx and arrived in Hong Kong in 2012. In Hong Kong he was trained by Richard Gibson. He is notable for winning the BMW Hong Kong Derby 2013 and the Longines Hong Kong Cup 2013.

Born on 14 February 2009 in England, Akeed Mofeed is sired by Dubawi, a three-time Group 1 winner whose renowned offspring include Dubai World Cup winner Monterosso and Cathay Pacific Hong Kong Sprint winner Lucky Nine. Before arriving in Hong Kong, Akeed Mofeed finished 4th in the Irish Derby 2012 and thereafter won a listed race, the Platinum Stakes. With great expectations from the media, Akeed Mofeed opened its account by winning an 1800m Class 2 race in early March 2013 and subsequently sealed its status as the best local 4-year-old of the year by capturing victory in the BMW Hong Kong Derby 2013. Akeed Mofeed is also the 1st runner-up of the G2 LONGINES Jockey Club Cup (2000m) at Sha Tin racecourse on Sunday, 17 November, losing only by a diminishing head to Endowing, the champion. On 8 December 2013, Akeed Mofeed was crowned champion of G1 LONGINES Hong Kong Cup.

== Dubai World Cup ==
Akeed Mofeed was invited to represent Hong Kong in the Dubai World Cup Carnival and competed in the most prestigious race, G1 Dubai World Cup (2000M – “Tapeta”) on 29 March 2014. He finished fifth among sixteen runners and won a prize of US$300,000.

== Retirement ==
Originally planned to make a start in the 2014 Queen Elizabeth II Cup upon his return from Dubai, Akeed Mofeed would sustain a tendon injury during trackwork prior to the race. It would fail to recover as expected with treatment, and Akeed Mofeed would be retired in June of the same year.

== Stallion career ==
Post retirement, Akeed Mofeed started at stud as a stallion at owner Pan Sutong's Goldin Farms, Lindsay Park in South Australia. He would briefly relocate to Swettenham Stud in Victoria in 2019 before returning to Goldin Farms in 2021. After his owner's bankruptcy in 2022, he moved to stand at Cornerstone Stud, later moving to Rosden Park in 2024.

As of 28th April 2026, Akeed Mofeed stands at AUD$2200, having sired several stakes winners. His most successful progeny are The Amazonian with a win in the Group Three SA Fillies Classic, and Assertive Approach with wins in the Listed Lightning Stakes and the Carlyon Stakes.

== Form Records ==
Date	Racecourse	Distance	Race Class	Name of Race	Actual Weight	Jockey	Place	Finishing Time	Length Behind Winner	Champion(1st Runner-up)
04/08/2011	Ireland	Firm - 1400M		Irish Stallion Farms E.B.F. Maiden	129	J. Murtagh	4/13	N/A	6-3/4	Learn
03/09/2011	Ireland	Firm - 1400M		Irish Stallion Farms E.B.F. Maiden	126	J. Murtagh	1/11	1.27.35	5	(Athens)
25/09/2011	Ireland	Very Heavy - 1600M	G2	Juddmonte Beresford Stakes	127	J. Murtagh	2/5	N/A	1/2	David Livingston
30/06/2012	Ireland	Heavy - 2400M	G1	Dubai Duty Free Irish Derby	126	W. Buick	4/5	N/A	18-1/2	Camelot
05/08/2012	Ireland	Heavy - 1600M	Listed	Platinum Stakes	128	N. McCullagh	1/5	1.44.20	5	(Barack)
12/01/2013	Sha Tin	Turf – 1400M		Class 2 – Beas River Handicap	119	O. Doleuze	3/14	1.22.44	1-1/2	Fulfil A Wish
17/02/2013	Sha Tin	Turf – 1800M	Hong Kong Group One	The Hong Kong Classic Cup	126	O. Doleuze	6/14	1.49.20	1-3/4	It Has To Be You
02/03/2013	Sha Tin	Turf – 1800M		Class 2 – Taipa Handicap	123	D. Whyte	1/14	1.47.45	2-1/2	(Kyara)
17/03/2013	Sha Tin	Turf – 2000M	Hong Kong Group One	The BMW Hong Kong Derby 2013	126	D. Whyte	1/13	2.01.84	1/2	(Endowing)
28/04/2013	Sha Tin	Turf – 2000M	Group One	The Audemars Piguet QEII Cup	126	D. Whyte	5/14	2.02.59	2-3/4	Military Attack
01/10/2013	Sha Tin	Turf – 1400M	Hong Kong Group Three	The National Day Cup (Handicap)	129	D. Whyte	9/14	1.21.57	5-1/4	Gold-Fun
27/10/2013	Sha Tin	Turf – 1600M	Hong Kong Group Two	The Oriental Watch Sha Tin Trophy (Handicap)	121	D. Whyte	7/12	1.34.55	3	Gold-Fun
17/11/2013	Sha Tin	Turf – 2000M	Group Two	The Longines Jockey Club Cup	123	D. Whyte	2/11	2.00.63	HD	Endowing
8/12/2013	Sha Tin	Turf – 2000M	Group One	The Longines Hong Kong Cup	126	D. Whyte	1/12	2.01.96	1	(Tokei Halo)
2/2/2014	Sha Tin	Turf – 1800M	Hong Kong Group Three	The Centenary Vase (Handicap)	133	D. Whyte	1/10	1.46.82	N	(Ashkiyr)
23/2/2014	Sha Tin	Turf – 2000M	Hong Kong Group One	The Citibank Hong Kong Gold Cup	126	D. Whyte	5/7	2.02.07	5-1/4	Military Attack
29/3/2014	Dubai	"Tapeta" - 2000M	G1	Dubai World Cup	126	D. Whyte	5/16	2:01.61	7-3/4	African Story
