= 2014 Prix de l'Arc de Triomphe =

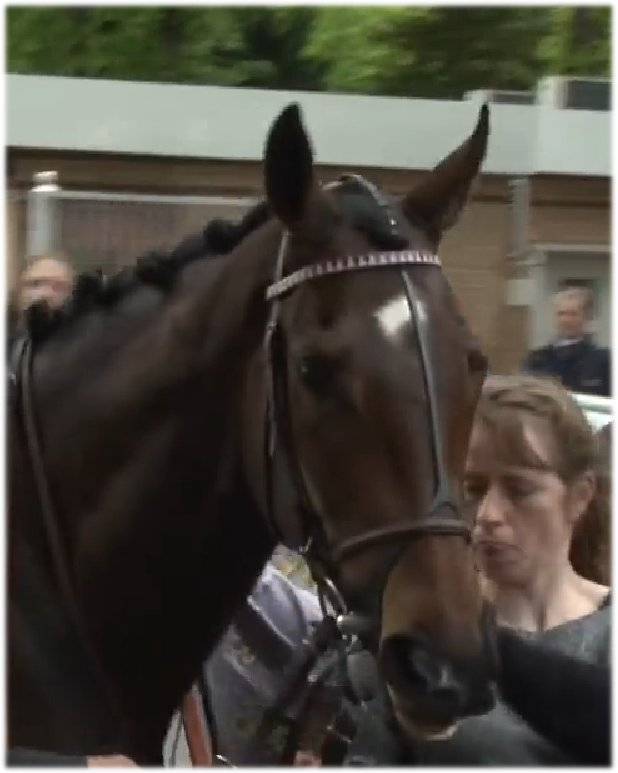
- 2014 Prix l'Arc de Triomphe winner, Treve
- Location: Longchamp Racecourse
- Date: October 5, 2014
- Winning horse: Treve

The 2014 Prix de l'Arc de Triomphe was a horse race held at Longchamp on Sunday, 5 October 2014. It was the 93rd running of the Prix de l'Arc de Triomphe.

The winner was Al Shaqab Racing's Treve, a four-year-old filly trained in France by Criquette Head-Maarek and ridden by Thierry Jarnet, repeating her victory in 2013. She became the first horse since Alleged to win the race twice. Treve's victory gave Head her third win in the race and was a record-equaling fourth success for Jarnet.

== The contenders ==
The 2013 winner Treve returned and attracted some support, despite having been beaten in all three of her races in 2014. The most fancied of the French runners were the three-year-olds Ectot, winner of the Prix Niel, and the unbeaten filly Avenir Certain winner of the Poule d'Essai des Pouliches and the Prix de Diane. The other French contenders included Flintshire (2013 Grand Prix de Paris), Dolniya (Prix de Malleret), Prince of Gibraltar (2013 Critérium de Saint-Cloud), and Spiritjim (disqualified after winning the Grand Prix de Saint-Cloud). There were three runners from Japan, headed by the Dubai Duty Free winner Just A Way who was moving up in distance. The other Japanese runners were the multiple Grade I winner Gold Ship, and the filly Harp Star who had won the Oka Sho and recorded an upset win over Gold Ship at Sapporo in August. Britain was represented by Taghrooda, a three-year-old filly who had won the Epsom Oaks and King George VI and Queen Elizabeth Stakes, the St Leger winner Kingston Hill and the six-year-old Al Kazeem, winner of the 2013 Eclipse Stakes who had been returned to racing after an unsuccessful spell at stud. There were three runners from Ireland, all from the Ballydoyle stable: Ruler of the World who had won the 2013 Epsom Derby and returned to form with a win in the Prix Foy, Tapestry who had recorded an upset win over Taghrooda in the Yorkshire Oaks and Chicquita, winner of the Irish Oaks in 2013. Germany was represented by the four-year-old Ivanhowe, who had defeated Sea The Moon (who had been ante-post favourite for the Arc) in the Grosser Preis von Baden. Taghrooda was sent off the 5.5/1 favourite, ahead of Avenir Certain (6/1), Ectot (6.7/1), Harp Star (6.9/1), and Just A Way (8/1) with Treve starting at odds of 14.4/1.

== The race ==
Ruler of the World started quickly, but was soon overtaken by Montviron, the pacemaker for Ectot.

Flintshire, Taghrooda, and Kingston Hill stayed on well, and Harp Star made rapid progress on the wide outside from a seemingly impossible position, but none of them were able to mount a serious challenge to the leader. Treve won by two lengths from Flintshire with Taghrooda in third ahead of Kingston Hill, Dolniya, and Harp Star.

== Race details ==
- Sponsor: Qatar Racing and Equestrian Club
- Purse: €5,000,000
- Going: Good
- Distance: 2,400 metres
- Number of runners: 20
- Winner's time: 2:26.05

== Full result ==
Pos.	Marg.	Horse	Age	Jockey	Trainer (Country)
1		Treve	4	Thierry Jarnet	Criquette Head-Maarek (FR)
2	2	Flintshire	4	Maxime Guyon	André Fabre (FR)
3	1¼	Taghrooda	3	Paul Hanagan	John Gosden (GB)
4	¾	Kingston Hill	3	Andrea Atzeni	Roger Varian (GB)
5	nk	Dolniya	3	Christophe Soumillon	Alain de Royer-Dupré (FR)
6	nk	Harp Star	3	Yuga Kawada	Hiroyoshi Matsuda (JPN)
7	hd	Prince Gibraltar	3	Jean-Bernard Eyquem	Jean-Claude Rouget (FR)
8	shd	Just A Way	5	Yuichi Fukunaga	Naosuke Sugai (JPN)
9	¾	Ruler of the World	4	Frankie Dettori	Aidan O'Brien (IRE)
10	nse	Al Kazeem	6	James Doyle	Roger Charlton (GB)
11	¾	Avenir Certain	3	Christophe Lemaire	Jean-Claude Rouget (FR)
12	nse	Siljan's Saga	4	Pierre-Charles Boudot	J-P Gauvin (FR)
13	1	Tapestry	3	Ryan Moore	Aidan O'Brien (IRE)
14	hd	Gold Ship	5	Norihiro Yokoyama	Naosuke Sugai (JPN)
15	1½	Chicquita	4	Joseph O'Brien	Aidan O'Brien (IRE)
16	nse	Spiritjim	4	Stéphane Pasquier	Pascal Bary (FR)
17	¾	Ectot	3	Gregory Benoist	Élie Lellouche (FR)
18	shd	Ivanhowe	4	William Buick	Jean-Pierre Carvalho (GER)
19	2	Free Port Lux	3	Mickael Barzalona	Freddy Head (FR)
20	9	Montviron	3	Cyrille Stefan	Élie Lellouche (FR)

- Abbreviations: ns = nose; shd = short-head; hd = head; snk = short neck; nk = neck

== Winner's details ==
Further details of the winner, Treve

- Sex: filly
- Foaled: 7 April 2010
- Country: France
- Sire: Motivator
- Owner: Al Shaqab Racing
- Breeder: Haras du Quesnay

== Subsequent breeding careers ==
Leading progeny of participants in the 2014 Prix de l'Arc de Triomphe.

=== Sires of Group/Grade One winners ===
Just A Way (8th)

- Danon The Kid - 1st Hopeful Stakes (2020)
- Teorema - 1st Japan Breeding Farms' Cup Ladies' Classic (2023)
- Rouge Eveil (2nd Queen Elizabeth II Cup 2023)
- Velox (2nd Satsuki Shō 2019)

Ruler of the World (9th)

- Iridessa – 1st Fillies' Mile (2018), 1st Matron Stakes, 1st Pretty Polly Stakes (Ireland), 1st Breeders' Cup Filly & Mare Turf (2019)

Al Kazeem (10th)

- Aspetar – 1st Preis von Europa (2019)

Gold Ship (14th)

- Meiner Grand - 1st Nakayama Daishogai (2023)
- Uberleben - 1st Yushun Himba (2021)
- Meisho Tabaru - 1st Takarazuka Kinen (2025)

=== Other Stallions ===
Kingston Hill (4th) – Minor flat winners
Prince Gibraltar (7th) – Minor flat winners
Flintshire (2nd) – Exported to America – Offspring yet to race
Ectot (17th) – Offspring yet to race
Ivanhowe (18th) – Offspring yet to race
Free Port Lux (19th) – Offspring yet to race

=== Broodmares ===
Chicquita (15th) – Secret Thoughts (3rd Silver Flash Stakes 2018)
Taghrooda (3rd) – Minor flat winner
Harp Star (6th) – Minor runner in Japan
Tapestry (13th) – Minor flat winner
Avenir Certain (11th) – Exported to Japan – Minor runner
Treve (1st) – Offspring yet to race
Dolniya (5th) – Offspring yet to race
Siljan's Saga (12th) – Offspring yet to race
