= 2014 1000 Guineas =

201st 1000 Guineas Stakes
- 1000 Guineas
- Location: Newmarket Racecourse
- Date: 4 May 2014
- Winning horse: Miss France (IRE)
- Jockey: Maxime Guyon
- Trainer: André Fabre (FR)
- Owner: Ballymore Thoroughbred

The 2014 1000 Guineas Stakes was a horse race held at Newmarket Racecourse on Sunday 4 May 2014. It was the 201st running of the 1000 Guineas.

The winner was the Ballymore Thoroughbred's Miss France, an Irish-bred bay filly trained at Chantilly by André Fabre and ridden by Maxime Guyon. Miss France's victory was the first in the race for her owner, trainer and jockey.

== The contenders ==
The race attracted a field of seventeen runners, thirteen trained in the United Kingdom, two in Ireland and two in France. The favourite was the Aidan O'Brien-trained Tapestry, who had won the Debutante Stakes and finished second in the Moyglare Stud Stakes in 2013. She was accompanied by her stable companion Bracelet, the winner of the Leopardstown 1,000 Guineas Trial Stakes. The Godolphin stable was represented by Ihtimal who had won the Sweet Solera Stakes and the May Hill Stakes in England in 2013 before taking the UAE 1000 Guineas and the UAE Oaks in Dubai in early 2014. The French challengers were the Oh So Sharp Stakes winner Miss France, and Vorda, the winner of the Prix Robert Papin and the Cheveley Park Stakes. The most strongly fancied of the British-trained runners was Rizeena, who had won the Queen Mary Stakes and beaten Tapestry in the Moyglare Stud Stakes. Other Group race winners in the field were Lucky Kristale (Duchess of Cambridge Stakes, Lowther Stakes), Sandiva (Nell Gwyn Stakes) and Princess Noor (Princess Margaret Stakes). Tapestry headed the betting at odds of 4/1 ahead of Rizeena (9/2), with Ihtimal and Miss France on 7/1.

== The race ==
Shortly after the start the fillies formed a single group racing down the centre of the wide Newmarket straight. The 100/1 outsider Manderley took the lead in the early stages and set a steady pace from Majeyda and Miss France with Ihtimal, Tapestry and Euro Charline close behind. Manderley maintained her advantage until the final quarter mile when she was challenged by Miss France and Ihtimal on her right as Lightning Thunder began to make rapid progress along the stands side rail. Miss France took the lead inside the final furlong and held off the string late challenge of Lightning Thunder to win by a neck with Ihtimal half a length away in third and Manderley holding on in fourth. Euro Charline took fifth ahead of Majeyda, Rizeena, Vorda and Sandiva. The favourite Tapestry dropped away and finished last of the fourteen runners.

Miss France's win meant that André Fabre joined Michael Stoute and Aidan O'Brien as the third active trainer to have won all five of the British Classic Races. After the race Fabre, admitted that Maxime Guyon had not followed his instructions, saying "I was a bit worried to see Miss France so close to the pace. It was not the plan at all. But it was a fantastic ride. He did not listen to me".

== Race details ==
- Sponsor: QIPCO
- First prize: £246,618
- Surface: Turf
- Going: Good to Firm
- Distance: 8 furlongs
- Number of runners: 17
- Winner's time: 1:37.40

== Full result ==
Pos.	Marg.	Horse (bred)	Jockey	Trainer (Country)	Odds
1		Miss France (IRE)	Maxime Guyon	André Fabre (FR)	7/1
2	nk	Lightning Thunder (GB)	Harry Bentley	Olly Stevens (GB)	14/1
3	½	Ihtimal (IRE)	Silvestre de Sousa	Saeed bin Suroor (GB)	7/1
4	¾	Manderley (IRE)	Pat Dobbs	Richard Hannon Jr. (GB)	100/1
5	1½	Euro Charline (GB)	Adam Kirby	Marco Botti (GB)	14/1
6	1¼	Majeyda (USA)	Mickael Barzalona	Charlie Appleby (GB)	33/1
7	nk	Rizeena (IRE)	Richard Hughes	Clive Brittain (GB)	9/2
8	shd	Vorda (FR)	Christophe Lemaire	Philippe Sogorb (FR)	14/1
9	1	Sandiva (IRE)	Frankie Dettori	Richard Fahey (GB)	16/1
10	½	Lamar (IRE)	Luke Morris	James Tate (GB)	100/1
11	¾	Joyeuse (GB)	James Doyle	Lady Cecil (GB)	16/1
12	nk	Princess Noor (IRE)	Andrea Atzeni	Roger Varian (GB)	25/1
13	1½	Lady Lara (IRE)	Kieren Fallon	Alan Jarvis (GB)	40/1
14	1½	Bracelet (IRE)	Ryan Moore	Aidan O'Brien (IRE)	11/1
15	6	Betimes (GB)	William Buick	John Gosden (GB)	25/1
16	13	Lucky Kristale (GB)	Tom Queally	George Margarson (GB)	14/1
17	1	Tapestry (IRE)	Joseph O'Brien	Aidan O'Brien (IRE)	4/1 fav

- Abbreviations: nse = nose; nk = neck; shd = head; hd = head; dist = distance; UR = unseated rider; DSQ = disqualified; PU = pulled up

== Winner's details ==
Further details of the winner, Miss France

- Foaled: 23 March 2011
- Country: Ireland
- Sire: Dansili; Dam: Miss Tahiti (Tirol)
- Owner: Ballymore Thoroughbred
- Breeder: Dayton Investments
