= Bracelet (horse) =

Irish-bred Thoroughbred racehorse

- Sire: Montjeu
- Grandsire: Sadler's Wells
- Dam: Cherry Hinton
- Damsire: Green Desert
- Sex: Mare
- Foaled: 24 January 2011
- Country: Ireland
- Colour: Bay
- Breeder: Roncon & Chelston
- Owner: Susan Magnier, Michael Tabor & Derrick Smith
- Trainer: Aidan O'Brien
- Record: 6: 4-0-0
- Earnings: £333,425

Major wins
- Leopardstown 1,000 Guineas Trial (2014); Ribblesdale Stakes (2014); Irish Oaks (2014)

Bracelet (foaled 24 January 2011) is an Irish Thoroughbred racehorse and broodmare. She won the second of her two starts as a two-year-old in 2013 and developed into a top-class filly in the following year, taking the Leopardstown 1,000 Guineas Trial and Ribblesdale Stakes. She recorded her biggest victory on her sixth and final appearance when she won the Irish Oaks. She was retired from racing at the end of the season and became a broodmare for the Coolmore Stud.

== Background ==
Bracelet is a bay mare with a narrow white blaze and two white socks bred in Ireland by Roncon & Chelston, breeding companies associated with the Coolmore Stud. The filly was sent into training with Aidan O'Brien at Ballydoyle and was ridden in four of her six races by her trainer's son Joseph. Like many Coolmore horses, Bracelet raced in the colours of a partnership consisting of Susan Magnier, Michael Tabor and Derrick Smith.

She was from the tenth crop of foals sired by Montjeu whose wins included the Prix du Jockey Club, Irish Derby, Prix de l'Arc de Triomphe and King George VI and Queen Elizabeth Stakes. As a breeding stallion his other progeny included Motivator, Authorized, Pour Moi, Camelot, Scorpion, Masked Marvel, Hurricane Fly, St Nicholas Abbey and Hurricane Run. Bracelet's dam Cherry Hinton (not to be confused with the mare foaled in 1975) failed to win in five starts but did finish fifth in the 2007 Epsom Oaks and also produced the Rockfel Stakes winner Wading. As a daughter of Urban Sea, Cherry Hinton was a half-sister to both Galileo, Sea the Stars and Black Sam Bellamy.

== Racing career ==
=== 2013: two-year-old season ===
Bracelet made her racecourse debut in the Listed Fillies' Sprint Stakes over six furlongs at Naas Racecourse on 3 June 2013 and finished eighth of the ten runners behind the favourite Sandiva. Ten days later the filly stepped up in distance but dropped in class for a maiden race over seven furlongs at Leopardstown Racecourse. Starting at odds of 1/2 she took the lead inside the final furlong and won "comfortably" by two lengths from the David Wachman-trained Tap Dancing.

=== 2014: three-year-old season ===
On 30 March 2014, Bracelet began her second season in the Group 3 Leopardstown 1,000 Guineas Trial over seven furlongs on very soft ground. After being restrained by Joseph O'Brien in the early stages she began to make steady progress approaching the last quarter mile, overtook the Dermot Weld-trained favourite Balansiya 100 yards from the finish and won by a length. Ryan Moore took the ride when Bracelet was sent to England to contest the 201st running of the 1000 Guineas over the Rowley Mile course at Newmarket Racecourse. She started the 11/1 fifth choice in the seventeen-runner field but was outpaced in the closing stages and came home in fourteenth place, more than ten lengths behind the winner Miss France.

Bracelet was ridden by Joseph O'Brien when she was stepped up in distance to contest the Ribblesdale Stakes over one and half miles at Royal Ascot on 19 June. Equipped with a hood for the first time, she was made the 10/1 fifth choice in the betting behind Vazira (Prix Saint-Alary), Inchila (fourth in The Oaks), Bright Approach (third in the Cheshire Oaks) and Wonderstruck. After racing in mid-division Bracelet made a forward move early in the straight, took the lead approaching the final furlong and won by half a length and a head from the outsiders Lustrous and Criteria. After the race Joseph O'Brien said "She did everything right today. She's tough, she stays and she tries."

A month after her win at Ascot Bracelet, ridden by Colm O'Donoghue, was one of ten fillies to contest the Irish Oaks over one and a half miles on good-to-firm ground the Curragh. The O'Brien stable fielded three other runners, namely Tapestry, Marvellous and Palace (Cairn Rouge Stakes). The Epsom Oaks runner-up Tarfasha started favourite ahead of Marvellous, Volume (third in the Epsom Oaks) and Tapestry with Bracelet next in the betting on 10/1. The start of the race was delayed when Volume was found to be wearing a set of horseshoes which were banned in Ireland, and which needed to be replaced before she was allowed to take part. O'Donoghue settled the filly in fourth place as Volume set the pace from Palace and Tarfasha. Bracelet moved forward on the outside shortly after the final turn, took the lead a furlong from the finish and held off the late challenge of her stablemate Tapestry to win by a neck, with the rallying Volume a neck away in third place. After the race Aidan O'Brien praised the winning jockey, commenting "It's great for Colm. He's just got beat in this race a few times and he's also been beat in the Derby a few times. He gave her a marvellous ride and he's a world-class rider".

Bracelet did not race again and was retired at the end of the year.

== Breeding record ==
After her retirement from racing, Bracelet became a broodmare for the Coolmore Stud. Her first foal was born in 2017:

- Chain of Gold, a colt, foaled in 2017, sired by Bayern

== Pedigree ==
Pedigree of Bracelet (IRE), bay mare, 2011
Sire Montjeu (IRE) 1996	Sadler's Wells (USA); 1981	Northern Dancer	Nearctic
Sire Montjeu (IRE) 1996	Sadler's Wells (USA); 1981	Northern Dancer	Natalma
Sire Montjeu (IRE) 1996	Sadler's Wells (USA); 1981	Fairy Bridge	Bold Reason
Sire Montjeu (IRE) 1996	Sadler's Wells (USA); 1981	Fairy Bridge	Special
Sire Montjeu (IRE) 1996	Floripedes (FR); 1985	Top Ville	High Top
Sire Montjeu (IRE) 1996	Floripedes (FR); 1985	Top Ville	Sega Ville
Sire Montjeu (IRE) 1996	Floripedes (FR); 1985	Toute Cy	Tennyson
Sire Montjeu (IRE) 1996	Floripedes (FR); 1985	Toute Cy	Adele Toumignon
Dam Cherry Hinton (GB) 2004	Green Desert (USA); 1983	Danzig	Northern Dancer
Dam Cherry Hinton (GB) 2004	Green Desert (USA); 1983	Danzig	Pas de Nom
Dam Cherry Hinton (GB) 2004	Green Desert (USA); 1983	Foreign Courier	Sir Ivor
Dam Cherry Hinton (GB) 2004	Green Desert (USA); 1983	Foreign Courier	Courtly Dee
Dam Cherry Hinton (GB) 2004	Urban Sea (USA); 1989	Miswaki	Mr. Prospector
Dam Cherry Hinton (GB) 2004	Urban Sea (USA); 1989	Miswaki	Hopespringseternal
Dam Cherry Hinton (GB) 2004	Urban Sea (USA); 1989	Allegretta	Lombard
Dam Cherry Hinton (GB) 2004	Urban Sea (USA); 1989	Allegretta	Anatevka (Family: 9-h)
