= Tapestry (horse) =

Irish Thoroughbred racehorse

- Racing colours of Susan Magnier
- Sire: Galileo
- Grandsire: Sadlers Wells
- Dam: Rumplestiltskin
- Damsire: Danehill
- Sex: Filly
- Foaled: 18th of January 2011
- Country: Ireland
- Colour: Bay
- Breeder: Orpendale And Niarchos Family
- Owner: Sue Magnier, Michael Tabor, Niarchos Family
- Trainer: Aidan O'Brien
- Record: 9:3-2-0
- Earnings: £353,238

Major wins
- Debutante Stakes (2013); Yorkshire Oaks (2014)

Tapestry foaled 18 January 2011 is an Irish Thoroughbred racehorse. She ran three times as a two-year-old, winning on her first two starts including the Debutante Stakes. Her greatest success came in 2014 when she won the 2014 Yorkshire Oaks ending the Oaks and King George VI and Queen Elizabeth Stakes winner Taghrooda's unbeaten record. She will stay in training as a 4 year old in 2015.

== Background ==
Tapestry is a bay filly, she is her dam Rumplestiltskin's 3rd foal. Her sire is Galileo, therefore, she is bred on the same Danehill Galileo cross that has produced leading horses like Frankel, Teofilo and Roderic O'Connor. She is a full sister to John F Kennedy. She is trained by Aidan O'Brien and owned by John Magnier's wife Sue, and running in her famous navy blue silks.

== Two Year-Old Career ==
Tapestry's career began in July 2013 in a maiden race at the Curragh. She was trainer Aidan O'Brien's second string with his son Joseph O'Brien riding the 6/4 joint favourite Snow. With 1 furlong to travel, Tapestry was 5th, but quickened to win by half a length under a ride by Seamie Heffernan.
She returned to the Curragh in August to contest the Group 2 Debutante Stakes. She was one of 6 fillies in the race, 3 of them trained by Aidan O'Brien. The 4/5 favourite was asked to quicken by Joseph O'Brien in the closing stages overtaking stablemate Perhaps to win by 1 and 3/4 lengths. The win caused some bookmakers to cut their ante post odds on her winning the 1000 Guineas. Aidan O'Brien said after the race she could be aimed at the Moyglare Stud Stakes.
For her final start of 2013 Tapestry ran in the Molyglare stud stakes, one of the leading races for 2 year old fillies with many past winners going on to win the 1000 Guineas. She was supplemented late for the race at a cost of €22,500. This race matched her against Kiyoshi who had won the Albany Stakes, Kiyoshi started 13/8 favourite with Tapestry at 2/1. The race was won by the Queen Anne Stakes winner Rizeena at a price of 9/2. Tapestry passed the winning post in the third place but a stewards enquiry found Jamie Spencer's filly Kiyoshi, who finished 2nd, to have interfered with her run and reversed the placings. After the race Aidan O'Brien praised her performance "She ran very well, As for the rest of this year, she has the option of going for the Fillies' Mile at Newmarket or we might just leave her off for the rest of the season."

== Three Year-Old Career ==
During a stable tour in early 2014 Aidan O'Brien revealed Tapestry would be sent straight to the 1000 Guineas without a prep run. She and Rizeena dominated the Ante post betting for the Guineas but mid April bookmakers began to lengthen their prices on tapestry due to the amount of bets on her rival.
Tapestry was joined in the Guineas by fellow Aidan O'Brien filly Bracelet, who had won the 1000 Guineas Trial Stakes and was ridden by Ryan Moore. On the day of the race a large number of bets before the off saw Tapestry's price shorten from 6/1 to 4/1 making her favourite for the race. She raced competitively for the first few furlongs but as the leaders began to quicken she had nothing to give with Joseph O'Brien pulling her up to finish in last place behind winner Miss France. Later Aidan O'Brien blamed himself for the flop as he knew she wasn't 100% fit for the race and should never have run her. He also ruled her out of running in the Irish 1000 Guineas.
Despite at one stage being the Ante post favourite Tapestry was scratched from The Oaks and instead was entered in the Coronation Stakes at Royal Ascot 2 weeks later. She never looked to threaten and finished 6th behind Rizeena. Her first Irish appearance of 2014 was in the Irish Oaks. Joseph O'Brien chose to ride her over his Epsom Oaks ride Marvellous. She finished 2nd to Bracelet, ridden by Colm O'Donoghue, despite stumbling out of the starting stalls and knocking her saddle to her rump.
A month later Tapestry was entered in the Yorkshire Oaks to face John Gosden's star filly Taghrooda who had made history becoming the first oaks winner to win the King George VI and Queen Elizabeth Stakes. Ryan Moore was enlisted to ride her with Joseph O'Brien riding last years runner up Venus de Milo. Connections of Taghrooda were confident in the filly and unsurprisingly bookies made her 1/5 to win. In the race Volume made the running with Taghrooda taking over in the home straight, Paul Hanagan pushed her along however Moore was able to get Tapestry ahead of her to win by a length ending her unbeaten run. Aidan O'Brien said "She went weak from halfway in the Guineas, which was probably down to pushing her in the spring, She had a break after that and the lads have done an unbelievable job to get her back. What she did in the [Irish] Oaks was extraordinary and Ryan produced her unbelievably today."
It was reported Tapestry's need start would be back over a mile in the Matron Stakes, billed as a rematch with Rizeena. Joseph O'Brien was back in the saddle having ridden Tapestry's younger brother John F Kennedy to victory in the Juvenile Turf Stakes earlier in the day. Despite starting second favourite at 9/4 Tapestry finished 9th of the 10 runners. Despite an entry in the Prix de l'Opéra at Longchamp Racecourse Tapestry was supplemented for the 2014 Prix de l'Arc de Triomphe at a cost of €120,000. Ridden by Ryan Moore she finished 13th behind Trévé.

== Pedigree ==
Pedigree of Tapestry (IRE), 2011
Sire Galileo (IRE) 1998	Sadler's Wells (USA); 1981	Northern Dancer	Nearctic
Sire Galileo (IRE) 1998	Sadler's Wells (USA); 1981	Northern Dancer	Natalma
Sire Galileo (IRE) 1998	Sadler's Wells (USA); 1981	Fairy Bridge	Bold Reason
Sire Galileo (IRE) 1998	Sadler's Wells (USA); 1981	Fairy Bridge	Special
Sire Galileo (IRE) 1998	Urban Sea (USA) ch. 1989	Miswaki	Mr Prospector
Sire Galileo (IRE) 1998	Urban Sea (USA) ch. 1989	Miswaki	Hopespringseternal
Sire Galileo (IRE) 1998	Urban Sea (USA) ch. 1989	Allegretta	Lombard
Sire Galileo (IRE) 1998	Urban Sea (USA) ch. 1989	Allegretta	Anatevka
Dam Rumplestiltskin (IRE) 2005	Danehill (USA); 1986	Danzig	Northern Dancer
Dam Rumplestiltskin (IRE) 2005	Danehill (USA); 1986	Danzig	Pas de Nom
Dam Rumplestiltskin (IRE) 2005	Danehill (USA); 1986	Rayzana	His Majesty
Dam Rumplestiltskin (IRE) 2005	Danehill (USA); 1986	Rayzana	Spring Adieu
Dam Rumplestiltskin (IRE) 2005	Monevassia (USA); 1994	Mr Prospector	Raise A Native
Dam Rumplestiltskin (IRE) 2005	Monevassia (USA); 1994	Mr Prospector	Gold Digger
Dam Rumplestiltskin (IRE) 2005	Monevassia (USA); 1994	Miesque	Nureyev
Dam Rumplestiltskin (IRE) 2005	Monevassia (USA); 1994	Miesque	Pasadoble
