= Vorda =

French-bred Thoroughbred racehorse

- Sire: Orpen
- Grandsire: Lure
- Dam: Velda
- Damsire: Observatory
- Sex: Mare
- Foaled: 30 March 2011
- Country: France
- Colour: Bay
- Breeder: S R L Edy
- Owner: Remy Picamau; Gerard Augustin-Normand; Mohammed bin Khalifa Al Thani
- Trainer: Philippe Sogorb
- Record: 11: 4-2-0
- Earnings: £308,038

Major wins
- Prix La Flèche (2013); Prix Robert Papin (2013); Cheveley Park Stakes (2013)

Vorda (30 March 2011 – 14 July 2022) was a French Thoroughbred racehorse and prospective broodmare. In a racing career which lasted from April 2013 until October 2014 she won four of her eleven races. After being bought cheaply as a yearling she was one of the best juvenile fillies in Europe in 2013. In France she won the Prix La Flèche and the Prix Robert Papin as well as finishing second in the Prix Morny before being sent to England to record her biggest victory in the Cheveley Park Stakes. She failed to win as a three-year-old but ran well in several major races before being retired at the end of the season.

== Background ==
Vorda was a bay mare with a white star bred in France by S R L Edy. Her sire, the Kentucky-bred Orpen, raced for the Coolmore Stud, recording his biggest victory in the 1998 Prix Morny. His other progeny have included the South African sprinter War Artist as well as Torrestrella (Poule d'Essai des Pouliches), Blu Constellation (Critérium de Maisons-Laffitte) and Killybegs (Craven Stakes). Vorda is second foal of her dam Velda who had little success as a racehorse in Italy before retiring to become a broodmare. She was a granddaughter of the Oaks d'Italia winner Val d'Erica.

In October 2012 the yearling filly was offered for sale at Deauville and was bought for €9,000 by the trainer Philippe Sogorb. The filly was trained by Sogorb throughout her racing career and initially raced in the ownership of Remy Picamau.

== Racing career ==
=== 2013: two-year-old season ===
Vorda began her racing career in the Prix Caravelle over 1000 metres at Chantilly Racecourse on 29 April. Ridden by François-Xavier Bertras, she started a 13.6/1 outsider and won by one and a half lengths from Aventure Love and six others. A majority share in the filly was then sold to Gerard Augustin-Normand. Gregory Benoist took over the ride when the filly was moved up in class and started 1.6/1 favourite for the Listed Prix La Flèche over the same distance at Maisons-Laffitte Racecourse on 11 June. After being restrained towards the rear of the seven-runner field she quickened to take the lead in the last 200 metres and won "comfortably" by one and three quarter lengths from the colt Muharaaj. On 21 July at the same track, the filly was stepped up in class and distance for the Group Two Prix Robert Papin over 1100 metres. She was made the 3/1 favourite ahead of the Prix du Bois winner Vedeux, whilst the other contenders included the British challengers Extortionist (Windsor Castle Stakes) and Ambiance (Dragon Stakes). Benoist settled the favourite behind the leaders as the Italian-trained filly Omaticaya set the pace, before moving forward 300 metres from the finish. Vorda took the lead in the closing stages and drew ahead to win by one and a half lengths and a short neck from Omaticaya and Vedeux. After the race Sogorb commented "She has just improved with every run and she does everything so easily".

On 18 August at Deauville Racecourse Vorda was moved up in class and distance again for the Group One Prix Morny over 1200 metres and started favourite ahead of the American-trained No Nay Never and the British filly Rizeena. After being held up as usual by Benoist she kept on well in the last 300 metres without ever looking likely to win and finished second, a length behind No Nay Never. Following the race, the filly was bought by the Qatari Sheikh Mohammed bin Khalifa Al Thani. On her next appearance, Vorda returned to all-female competition and was sent to England for the Group One Cheveley Park Stakes over six furlongs at Newmarket Racecourse on 28 September. Ridden by Olivier Peslier she started the 11/8 favourite ahead of the Albany Stakes winner Kiyoshi, whilst the other five runners included Joyeuse (Dick Poole Fillies' Stakes), Come To Heel (Curragh Stakes) and Princess Noor (Princess Margaret Stakes). Peslier tracked the leaders before making a forward move approaching the final furlong. She overtook Princess Noor in the closing stages and won by three quarters of a length with Kiyoshi and Come To Heel in third and fourth. Interviewed after the race, Sogorb said "From the very beginning I knew I had a good filly... She stood out from the rest, she was better than average but I didn't imagine I had a Group 1 winner". The former jockey added "I regret not being able to ride her myself".

For her final appearance as a two-year-old, Vorda was sent to the United States to contest the Breeders' Cup Juvenile Fillies Turf over one mile at Santa Anita Park on 1 November. She was made the 11/4 favourite, but after racing on the outside for most of the way she made no impression in the closing stages and finished seventh behind the British-trained Chriselliam.

=== 2014: three-year-old season ===
Vorda failed to win in 2014, when she was ridden in all five of her races by Christophe Lemaire. On her seasonal debut she contested the Prix Imprudence (a trial race for both the 1000 Guineas and the Poule d'Essai des Pouliches) over 1400 metres at Maisons-Laffitte on 3 April. After taking the lead 200 metres from the finish she was caught in the final strides and beaten a short neck by the François Doumen-trained Xcellence, with the favourite Miss France in sixth. On 4 April Vorda returned to Newmarket for the 201st running of the 1000 Guineas over the Rowley Mile. She started at odds of 14/1 and never threatened to reproduce her Cheveley Park success, finishing eighth of the seventeen runners behind Miss France. In July she ran fourth to the German seven-year-old in the Group Three Prix de la Porte Maillot and in the following month she finished fifth behind the British colt Garswood in the Group One Prix Maurice de Gheest. Vorda's final race was the Group One Prix de la Forêt over 1400 metres at Longchamp Racecourse on 5 October. Starting a 16/1 outsider she stayed on well to take fourth place, two and a quarter lengths behind the winner Olympic Glory.

== Pedigree ==
Pedigree of Vorda (FR), bay filly, 2011
Sire Orpen (USA) 1996	Lure (USA); 1989	Danzig	Northern Dancer
Sire Orpen (USA) 1996	Lure (USA); 1989	Danzig	Pas de Nom
Sire Orpen (USA) 1996	Lure (USA); 1989	Endear	Alydar
Sire Orpen (USA) 1996	Lure (USA); 1989	Endear	Chappaquiddick
Sire Orpen (USA) 1996	Bonita Francita (CAN); 1987	Devil's Bag	Halo
Sire Orpen (USA) 1996	Bonita Francita (CAN); 1987	Devil's Bag	Ballade
Sire Orpen (USA) 1996	Bonita Francita (CAN); 1987	Raise the Standard	Hoist The Flag
Sire Orpen (USA) 1996	Bonita Francita (CAN); 1987	Raise the Standard	Natalma
Dam Velda (GB) 2006	Observatory (USA); 1997	Distant View	Mr. Prospector
Dam Velda (GB) 2006	Observatory (USA); 1997	Distant View	Seven Springs
Dam Velda (GB) 2006	Observatory (USA); 1997	Stellaria	Roberto
Dam Velda (GB) 2006	Observatory (USA); 1997	Stellaria	Victoria Star
Dam Velda (GB) 2006	Viavigoni (GB); 2001	Mark of Esteem	Darshaan
Dam Velda (GB) 2006	Viavigoni (GB); 2001	Mark of Esteem	Homage
Dam Velda (GB) 2006	Viavigoni (GB); 2001	Val d'Erica	Ashmore
Dam Velda (GB) 2006	Viavigoni (GB); 2001	Val d'Erica	Laconia (Family: 14-c)
