= Integral (horse) =

British-bred Thoroughbred racehorse

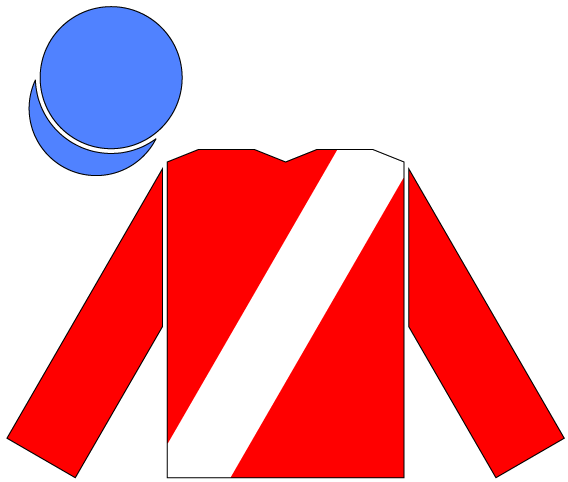
- Racing silks of Cheveley Park Stud
- Sire: Dalakhani
- Grandsire: Darshaan
- Dam: Echelon
- Damsire: Danehill
- Sex: Mare
- Foaled: 13 March 2010
- Country: Great Britain
- Colour: Bay
- Breeder: Cheveley Park Stud
- Owner: Cheveley Park Stud
- Trainer: Sir Michael Stoute
- Jockey: Ryan Moore
- Record: 15: 6–3–1
- Earnings: £584,063

Major wins
- Distaff Stakes (2013); Atalanta Stakes (2013); Duke of Cambridge Stakes (2014); Falmouth Stakes (2014); Sun Chariot Stakes (2014)

Integral (foaled 13 March 2010) is a British Thoroughbred racehorse. Unraced as a two-year-old, she was a Group 3 winner at three when finishing in a dead heat for first place in the Atalanta Stakes. In 2014 she won the Duke of Cambridge Stakes at Royal Ascot, before scoring her first Group One in her next race, the Falmouth Stakes. She went on to record a second Group One success in the Sun Chariot Stakes. In 2015 she failed to win but finished second in the Sun Chariot Stakes and fourth in the Queen Elizabeth II Stakes.

== Background ==
Integral is a bay filly bred by Cheveley Park Stud and foaled on 13 March 2010. She was sired by Dalakhani, who was named Cartier Horse of the Year in 2003 after wins in the Prix Lupin, Prix du Jockey Club and Prix de l'Arc de Triomphe. As a breeding stallion his offspring have included Conduit, Duncan and Reliable Man. Integral's dam is Echelon, who won a number of Group races over her four-season racing career, including a Group 1 victory in the Matron Stakes in 2007. Echelon's dam Exclusive is a half-sister to the 2000 Guineas winner Entrepreneur. Integral is trained at Newmarket by Sir Michael Stoute.

== Racing career ==
=== 2013: three-year-old season ===
Integral never raced as a two-year-old and started her racing career in a one-mile maiden race at Goodwood on 31 May 2013. Jockey Ryan Moore positioned her behind the leaders, before taking the lead two furlongs from the finish and drawing clear to win by two and three quarter lengths from pre-race favourite Magic of Reality. Her next race was the Distaff Stakes, a Listed race which is run over one mile at Sandown Park. After being at the back of the field for the majority of the race, she made quick progress in the final furlong to take the lead with 100 yards to run, winning the race by one and a half lengths from Light Up My Life. On 3 August, Integral raced in the Nassau Stakes, where she started at the price of 8/1. She was short of racing room over a furlong out and had to be moved out by Moore. She never got on terms with the leaders and finished in seventh place behind winner Winsili. Integral started as the 13/8 favourite for the Atalanta Stakes at the end of August. Moore held her up and was in the last two in the early stages, before moving through the field from three furlongs out to take the lead two out. She was just overtaken by Ladys First with 100 yards to run, but battled back to join her on the line, with the pair finishing in a dead heat for first place, one and three quarter lengths clear of third-placed Shuruq. Integral's final race of 2013 was the Sun Chariot Stakes on 28 September, where she was again held up in the early stages. She began to make headway two furlongs out and was in the lead as the field entered the final furlong, but she was overtaken by Sky Lantern, with about half a furlong to go. Sky Lantern won the race by a length from Integral, who was two lengths ahead of third-placed Duntle.

=== 2014: four-year-old season ===
Integral started favourite for her reappearance as a four-year-old in the Dahlia Stakes. After being held up at the rear she moved through to challenge the leaders as they entered the final furlong. Esoterique and Integral pulled away from the rest of the field and were neck and neck inside the last 200 yards, but Integral could not quite get to Esoterique, losing by a head. At Royal Ascot, Integral was one of the 14 fillies and mares to line up for the Duke of Cambridge Stakes. Ryan Moore positioned her just behind the leaders in the early stages before quickening to take the lead over a furlong from the finish. She drifted right in the closing stages, but pulled away to win by two lengths from L'Amour De Ma Vie. On 11 July, Integral was ridden by regular jockey Ryan Moore in the Falmouth Stakes. She started the race as the 15/8 favourite and chased leader Sky Lantern in the early stages. Rizeena moved up to join Sky Lantern at the head of the field after three furlongs, with Integral just behind the pair. Sky Lantern began to fade three furlongs from the finish, leaving Rizeena in an outright lead until she was overtaken by Integral over one furlong from the finish. As they entered the final furlong Integral had a two length lead, which she maintained until the finish to win the race, beating runner-up Rizeena by that margin, with Peace Burg a further three quarters of a length behind the runner-up in third place.

Integral then traveled to Frances for the Prix Rothschild, where she faced only three opponents. Racing abroad for the first time, she raced in second for much of the race and all four runners were in with a chance with 200 metres to run. Miss France took the lead about 100 metres out, but was soon overtaken by Esoterique, who won the race by three quarters of a length from Miss France, with Integral third and L'Amour De Ma Vie fourth. In October, Integral returned to Newmarket for the Group One Sun Chariot Stakes in which she was one of four 7/2 co-favourites alongside Fintry, Esoterique and Miss France, with Sky Lantern among the other runners. She took the lead from the start and set a steady pace from Esoterique before accelerating in the final quarter mile and winning by a length from Miss France. Integral was matched against colts in the Queen Elizabeth II Stakes at Ascot on 18 October. She started the 9/2 second favourite but never looked likely to win and finished seventh of the eleven runners behind Charm Spirit.

=== 2015: five-year-old season ===
On her five-year-old debut, Integral finished fourth against male opposition in the Lockinge Stakes and then attempted to repeat her 2014 success in the Duke of Cambridge Stakes. She was made the 8/11 favourite but tired badly in the closing stages and finished fifth of the six runners behind Amazing Maria. After a lengthy break she returned in October for the Sun Chariot Stakes on 3 October. After leading for most of the way she was caught inside the final furlong and beaten half a length by the French-trained Esoterique. Two weeks later she started a 20/1 outsider for the Queen Elizabeth II Stakes in which she was ridden for the first time by Frankie Dettori. She stayed on steadily in the closing stages to finish fourth of the nine runners behind Solow, Belardo and Gabrial.

== Assessment ==
At the end of 2013, Integral was given an official rating of 115 for her performance in the Sun Chariot Stakes, ranking her as the joint 200th best racehorse in the world.

== Pedigree ==
Pedigree of Integral, bay filly, 2010
Sire Dalakhani (IRE) gr. 2000	Darshaan (GB) br. 1981	Shirley Heights b. 1975	Mill Reef
Sire Dalakhani (IRE) gr. 2000	Darshaan (GB) br. 1981	Shirley Heights b. 1975	Hardiemma
Sire Dalakhani (IRE) gr. 2000	Darshaan (GB) br. 1981	Delsy b. 1972	Abdos
Sire Dalakhani (IRE) gr. 2000	Darshaan (GB) br. 1981	Delsy b. 1972	Kelty
Sire Dalakhani (IRE) gr. 2000	Daltawa (IRE) gr. 1989	Miswaki ch. 1978	Mr. Prospector
Sire Dalakhani (IRE) gr. 2000	Daltawa (IRE) gr. 1989	Miswaki ch. 1978	Hopespringseternal
Sire Dalakhani (IRE) gr. 2000	Daltawa (IRE) gr. 1989	Damana gr. 1981	Crystal Palace
Sire Dalakhani (IRE) gr. 2000	Daltawa (IRE) gr. 1989	Damana gr. 1981	Denia
Dam Echelon (GB) b. 2002	Danehill (USA) b. 1986	Danzig b. 1977	Northern Dancer
Dam Echelon (GB) b. 2002	Danehill (USA) b. 1986	Danzig b. 1977	Pas de Nom
Dam Echelon (GB) b. 2002	Danehill (USA) b. 1986	Razyana b. 1981	His Majesty
Dam Echelon (GB) b. 2002	Danehill (USA) b. 1986	Razyana b. 1981	Spring Adieu
Dam Echelon (GB) b. 2002	Exclusive (GB) ch. 1995	Polar Falcon b. 1987	Nureyev
Dam Echelon (GB) b. 2002	Exclusive (GB) ch. 1995	Polar Falcon b. 1987	Marie d'Argonne
Dam Echelon (GB) b. 2002	Exclusive (GB) ch. 1995	Exclusive Order ch. 1979	Exclusive Native
Dam Echelon (GB) b. 2002	Exclusive (GB) ch. 1995	Exclusive Order ch. 1979	Bonavista (Family 6-e)
