= Flintshire (horse) =

British-bred Thoroughbred racehorse

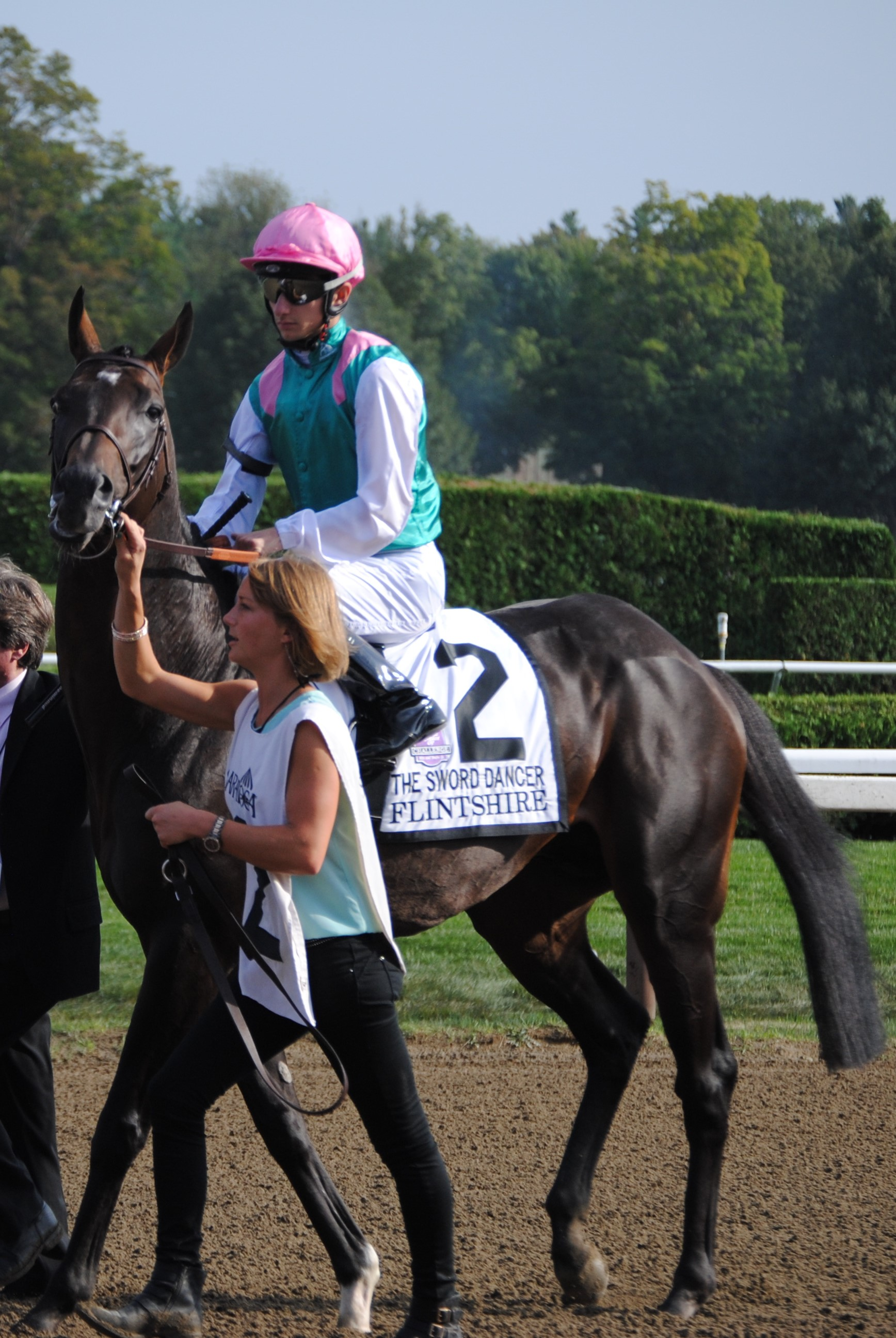
- Flintshire before the 2015 Sword Dancer
- Sire: Dansili
- Grandsire: Danehill
- Dam: Dance Routine
- Damsire: Sadler's Wells
- Sex: Colt
- Foaled: 4 April 2010
- Country: United Kingdom
- Colour: Dark bay or brown
- Breeder: Juddmonte Farms
- Owner: Khalid Abdullah
- Trainer: André Fabre; Chad C. Brown
- Record: 23: 8-11-1
- Earnings: £5,786,144 $8,909,910

Major wins
- Prix du Lys (2013); Grand Prix de Paris (2013); Hong Kong Vase (2014); Sword Dancer Stakes (2015, 2016); Manhattan Handicap (2016); Bowling Green Handicap (2016)

Awards
- American Champion Male Turf Horse (2016)

Flintshire (foaled 4 April, 2010) is a British-bred Thoroughbred racehorse who has been trained in France and the United States. Unraced as a juvenile, he was one of the best three-year-old colts in France in 2013, winning the Prix du Lys and the Grand Prix de Paris. In 2014 he finished second in the Prix de l'Arc de Triomphe and the Breeders' Cup Turf before recording his biggest win in the Hong Kong Vase. As five-year-old he won the Sword Dancer Invitational Handicap and again finished second in the Arc. At the start of his six-year-old season in 2016 he was sent to be trained in the United States. He began the season with victories in the Manhattan Handicap, Bowling Green Handicap and Sword Dancer Stakes, before finishing second in his last two starts, the Joe Hirsch Turf Classic and Breeders' Cup Turf.

== Background ==
Flintshire is a dark bay or brown colt with a small white star and a white sock on his right front leg, bred in the United Kingdom by his owner, Khalid Abdullah's Juddmonte Farms. He was sired by Dansili, whose other progeny have included Harbinger, The Fugue, Dank and Rail Link. Flintshire's dam Dance Routine was a successful racemare whose wins included the Prix de Royaumont and the Prix de Royallieu. The colt was sent into training with André Fabre at Chantilly. Before being transferred to the United States in 2016, he was ridden by Maxime Guyon.

== Racing career ==
=== 2013: three-year-old season ===
Flintshire did not race as a two-year-old, making his debut in a maiden race over 2000 metres at Chantilly on May 7. He started favourite in an eight-runner field and won by two and a half lengths from Temps Libre after taking the lead 200 metres from the finish. Four weeks later he started 3/5 favourite for the Prix de Lormoy at Longchamp Racecourse but after taking the lead in the straight he was overtaken in the last 100 metres and beaten a length by the outsider Silver Trail. Despite his defeat, Flintshire was moved up in class to contest the Group III Prix du Lys over 2400 metres at Chantilly on 16 June and started the 7/2 second favourite behind the Élie Lellouche-trained Park Reel. After racing towards the middle of the nine runner field he took the lead 200 metres from the finish and accelerated clear to win in "impressive" style by three lengths from Park Reel. On 13 July at Longchamp Flintshire started favourite for the 152nd running of the Grand Prix de Paris over 2400 metres, with his main rivals appearing to be the Prix Greffulhe winner Ocovango (also trained by Fabre) and the Aidan O'Brien-trained Battle of Marengo, winner of the Derrinstown Stud Derby Trial. Flintshire was restrained towards the rear of the eight runner field, before moving forward in the straight, and taking the lead 200 metres out. He accelerated clear before being eased down by Guyon to win by one and a half lengths from Manndawi, with Ocavango in third. Fabre said that the winner "has great acceleration and is a very exciting horse".

After a summer break, Flintshire returned for the Prix Niel at Longchamp on 15 September. He started 5/4 in a strong field but although he made progress in the straight he never looked likely to win and finished fourth behind Kizuna, Ruler of the World and Ocavango. On his final appearance of the year, Flintshire contested the 92nd running of France's most prestigious race, the Prix de l'Arc de Triomphe. Starting at odds of 12/1 in a seventeen-runner field he finished eighth, twelve lengths behind the winner Treve.

=== 2014: four-year-old season ===
On his first appearance as a four-year-old, Flintshire was sent to England to contest the Coronation Cup at Epsom Downs Racecourse on 7 June and finished second to the odds-on favourite Cirrus des Aigles with the unplaced runners including Talent and Joshua Tree. Three weeks later, Flintshire started 13/8 favourite for the Grand Prix de Saint-Cloud and finished fifth of the seven runners behind the subsequently disqualified Spiritjim. Flintshire was scheduled to contest the King George VI and Queen Elizabeth Stakes at Ascot Racecourse in late July but was withdraw after running a high temperature shortly before the race.

On his return to the track in September, Flintshire started the 6/4 favourite for the Prix Foy and finished second to Ruler of the World. On October 5 the colt ran for the second time in the Prix de l'Arc de Triomphe and started at odds of 16/1. He stayed on in the straight to finish second, two lengths behind the winner Treve. The other beaten horses included Taghrooda, Kingston Hill, Harp Star, Just A Way, Ruler of the World, Al Kazeem, Avenir Certain, Gold Ship and Ectot. Flintshire was then to the United States to contest the 31st running of the Breeders' Cup Turf, run that year at Santa Anita Park and started the 11/4 second favourite behind the British colt Telescope. After starting slowly, he was soon in touch with the leaders before taking the lead approaching the final furlong, but was overtaken in the final strides and beaten half a length by Main Sequence. On his last appearance of the season, Flintshire was sent to Hong Kong to contest the Hong Kong Vase on 14 December and started the 11/10 favourite against ten opponents including the last two winners of the race Dominant and Red Cadeaux. Other contenders included Empoli (Preis von Europa) from Germany, Parish Hall (Dewhurst Stakes) from Ireland, Snow Sky (Gordon Stakes) from England and Curren Mirotic from Japan. In a slowly-run race, Guyon settled the colt in mid-division before moving forward on the outside in the straight, taking the lead inside the final furlong and winning by half a length from the locally trained Willie Cazals. Khalid Abdullah's representative Teddy Grimthorpe said "It's really important and we're absolutely thrilled. We've had near misses with Polish Summer and Cityscape so to nail it is fantastic. I was yelling from the stands for Maxime to go on, but he's got a good turn of foot and it worked out, although he would have preferred a faster pace. He stays in training and will have an international campaign next year".

=== 2015: five-year-old season ===
Flintshire made his first appearance of 2015 in the Prix Darshaan over 1900 metres on the Polytrack surface at Chantilly on 3 March. The race was intended as a trial for French-trained horses aimed at the Dubai World Cup Night meeting. He started the 1/2 favourite but was beaten a short neck by the four-year-old filly Dolniya. In the Sheema Classic at Meydan Racecourse on 28 March, Flintshire started 3/1 second favourite behind the Japanese filly Harp Star in a field which also included Dolniya, Main Sequence and Designs On Rome. In a slowly-run race, he raced in mid-division before making steady progress in the straight and finished second, two and a quarter lengths behind Dolniya.

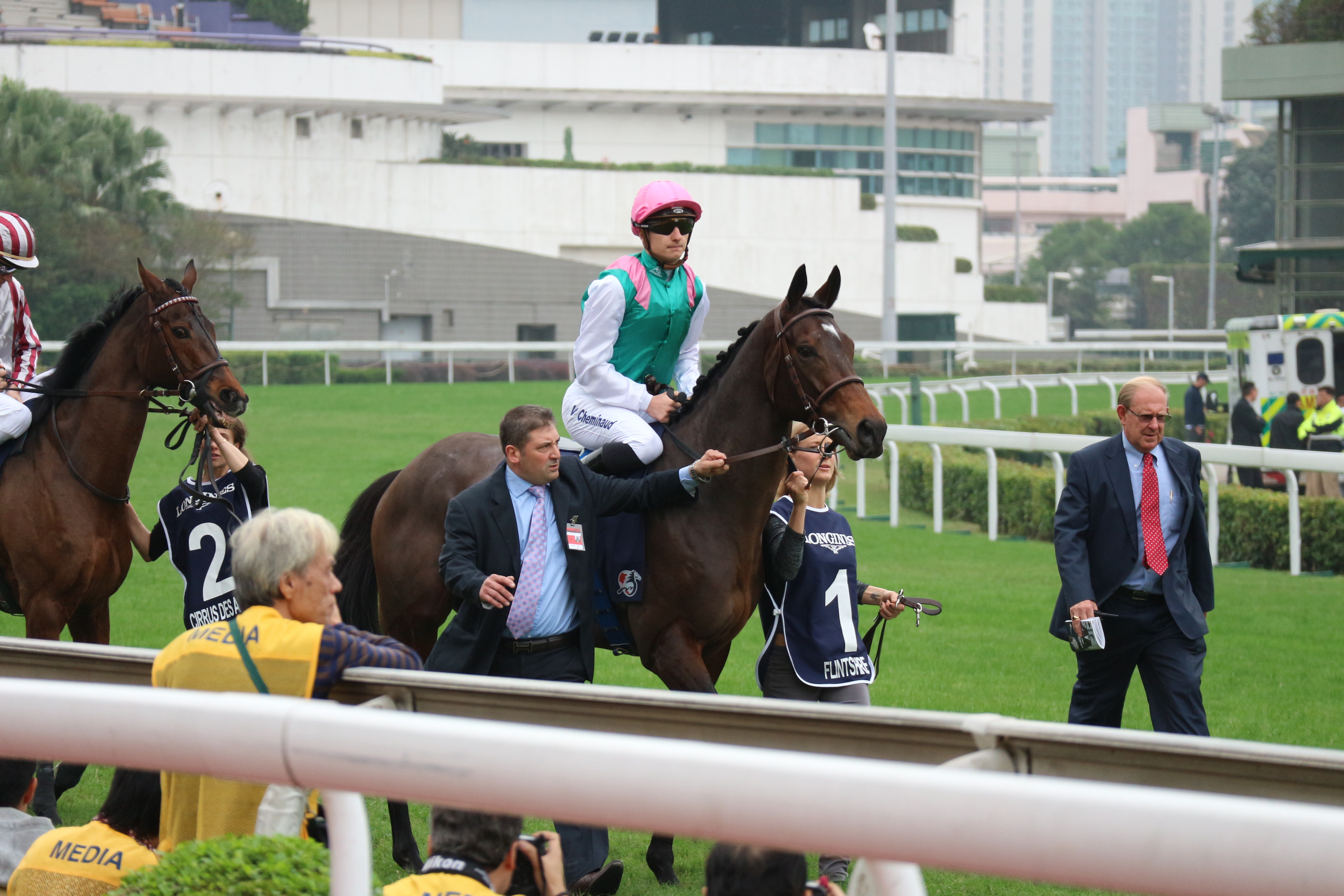
Flintshire before the 2015 Hong Kong Vase

On his return to Europe, Flintshire faced Dolniya yet again in the Coronation Cup on 6 June. After tracking the filly for most of the way he was outpaced in the final furlong and finished third of the four runners behind the upset winner Pether's Moon. On his return to France, the horse started the 5.7/1 third favourite behind Treve and Dolniya in the Grand Prix de Saint-Cloud on 28 June. After tracking the leaders he took the lead in the straight but was overtaken by Treve in the closing stages and was beaten one and a quarter lengths into second place. An intended run in the King George VI and Queen Elizabeth Stakes was abandoned owing to the soft ground at Ascot. Flintshire was shipped back to America and contested the 1.5-mile (2,400 m) Sword Dancer Stakes at Saratoga Race Course in New York State on 29 August. In a stalking position until the final turn, he then took a commanding lead and won by three lengths in a time of 2:23.77 on a firm turf course. Khalid Abdulla's racing manager Teddy Grimthorpe commented "He's just so unbelievably consistent. He's traveled the world. He's won in Hong Kong, he's won in Dubai, and now he's won here. He's a remarkable horse".

On October 4 Flintshire made his third bid for the Prix de l'Arc de Triomphe and started at odds of 18.6/1 in a seventeen-runner field. He was among the leaders from the start and stayed on strongly in the straight to finish second, two lengths behind the winner Golden Horn. Flintshire attempted to repeat his 2014 success in the Hong Kong Vase and finished second to the Irish three-year-old Highland Reel.

=== 2016: six-year-old season ===
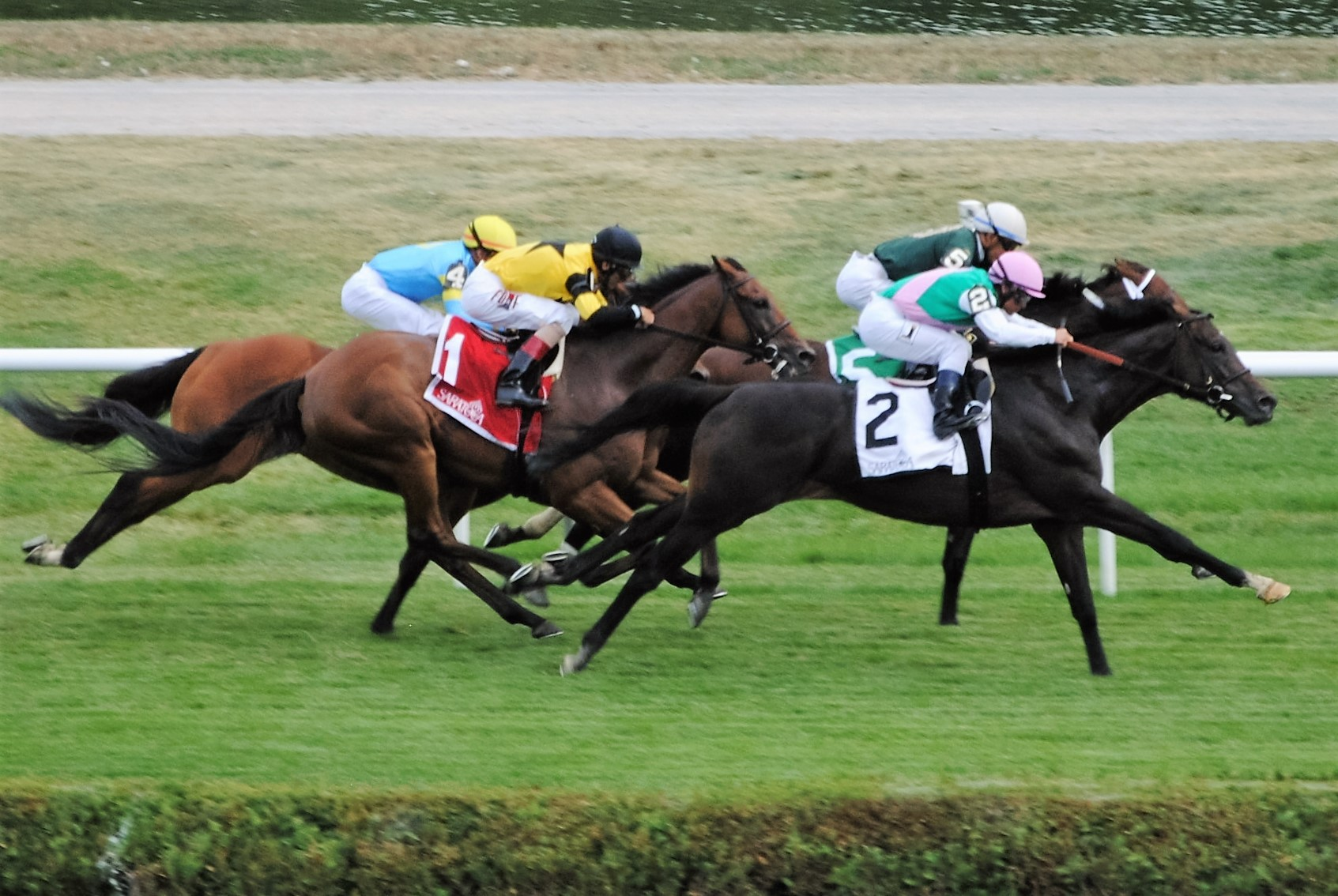
Flintshire strikes the lead in the 2016 Bowling Green Handicap

In 2016, Flintshire was transferred to the United States and entered the stable of Chad C. Brown. On his first appearance for his new trainer, he contested the Grade I Manhattan Handicap at Belmont Park and started favourite in an eleven-runner field which included the 2015 American Champion Male Turf Horse, Big Blue Kitten. Ridden by Javier Castellano, he tracked a slow place, then kicked free in the stretch. He won in a time of 1:58.92 for 1.25-mile (2,010 m).

On 30 July, Flintshire was the 1-9 favorite in the Bowling Green Handicap at Saratoga, facing three rivals. Grand Tito set a "glacial" place of 1:19.4 for the first 6 furlongs in the 1 3/8-mile race. Flintshire was close behind the leader but boxed by the other two horses against the rail. As they entered the stretch, Flintshire dropped back and started to swing around the other horses, then had to adjust his path again. Finally in the clear, he accelerated rapidly and won by 3/4 lengths.

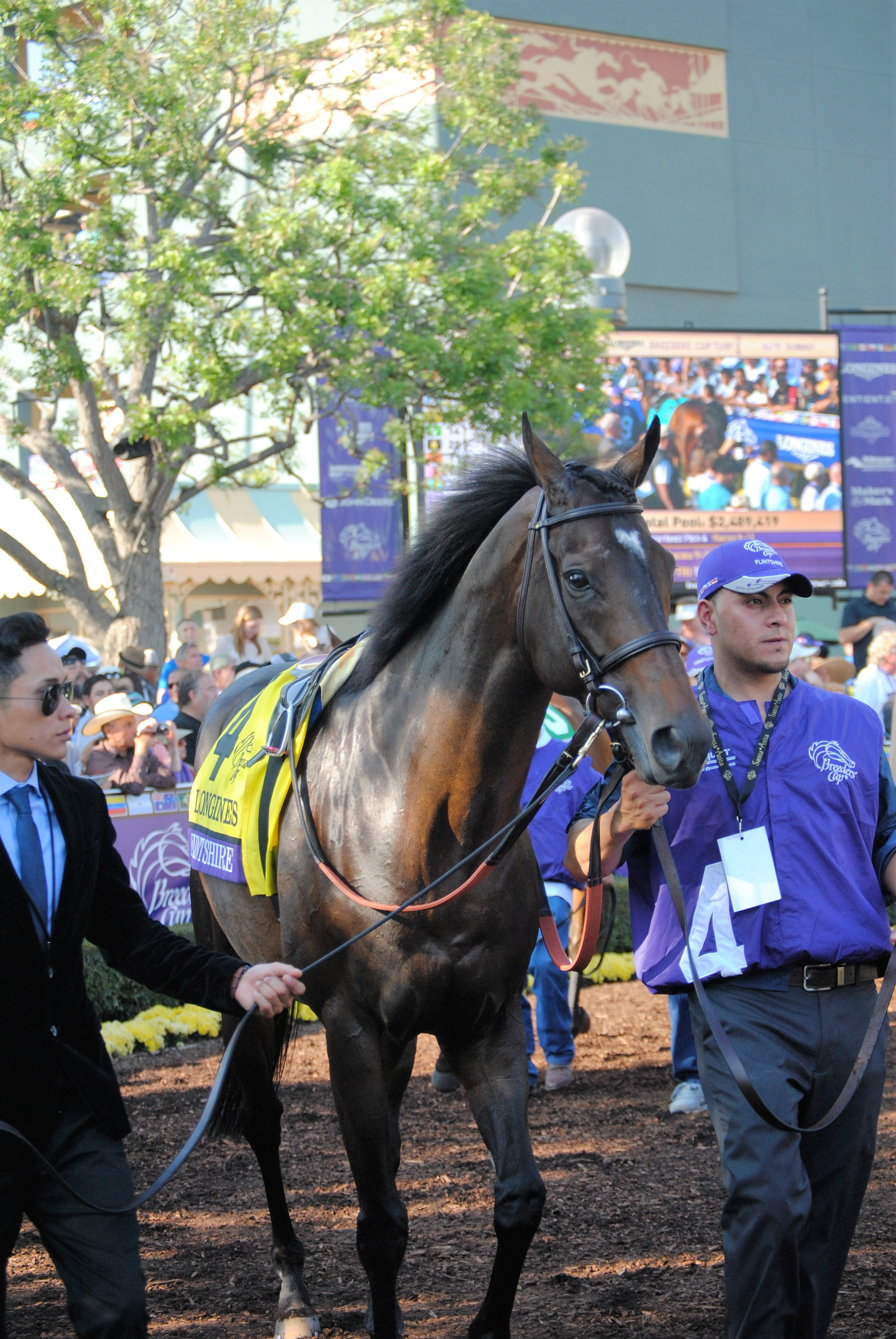
Flintshire at the 2016 Breeders' Cup

On 27 August, Flintshire won the Sword Dancer Stakes for the second year in a row. To prevent a repetition of the problems experienced in the Bowling Green, Juddmonte also entered Inordinate as a "rabbit" to ensure a fast pace. As they entered the stretch, Flintshire was moving well but looked trapped on the rail. Inordinate's jockey pulled the horse wide, causing another horse to check while opening a hole for Flintshire to accelerate through. Flintshire drew off to win by 1 3/4 in an excellent time of 2:23.45, just 1/5 off the stakes record, having run the last quarter mile in 22 seconds. A claim of foul against Inordinate was disallowed, but the stewards did speak with Brown and the jockeys involved.

On 3 October, Flintshire finished second in the Joe Hirsch Turf Classic on yielding turf, unable to make up enough ground on the front-running Ectot. "We knew the risk going into the race running on soft ground. He has a poor record on it", said Brown. "I didn't see another option; I didn't feel comfortable going into the Breeders' Cup without a prep. So, we gave it a shot and it didn't work out."

On 5 November, Flintshire was made the favorite for the $4 million Breeders' Cup Turf. The other nine runners included Highland Reel (King George), Found (Arc, 2015 Breeders' Cup Turf), Ectot, Ashleyluvssugar (Del Mar Handicap), Da Big Hoss (American St. Leger Stakes), Mondialiste (Arlington Million), Ulysses (an improving three-year-old from Europe) and the veteran Twilight Eclipse (Man o' War Stakes). Unexpectedly, Highland Reel took the lead soon after the start and set a steady pace before kicking seven lengths clear of his opponents at half way. Flintshire made a late move but had too much ground to make up, finishing 1 3/4 lengths back, with Found staying on to take third place. "Unfortunately, the way it worked out, it was unfortunate for my horse", said Castellano. "Usually you don’t see the European horses run so aggressively, open up, and carry their speed — especially at 1 1/2 miles — but it worked out great for him."

== Retirement and stud ==
Flintshire was retired to stud at Hill 'n' Dale Farms near Lexington, Kentucky after a partnership was formed including Hill 'n' Dale, S.F. Bloodstock, China Horse Club, and Juddmonte Farms. His fee for 2017 will be $20,000 live foal. "He is by our most accomplished stallion, from one of our best families", said Garrett O'Rourke, general manager of Juddmonte's Kentucky operation. "He is our leading earner ever and one of the soundest and most honest horses we have ever raced. He has a regal temperament and a will to win that shows in his scintillating turn of foot. We are very proud of him."

In 2021 Flintshire was moved to Haras de Montaigu in France and in 2023 Flintshire stood for €6,000 fee. In 2023 Flintshire's daughter Surge Capacity won the Grade 1 Matriarch Stakes at Del Mar.

=== Notable progeny ===
c = colt, f = filly, g = gelding

Foaled	Name	Sex	Major Wins
2020	Surge Capacity	f	Matriarch Stakes

== Pedigree ==
Pedigree of Flintshire (GB), dark bay or brown colt, 2010
Sire Dansili (GB) 1996	Danehill (IUSA); 1986	Danzig	Northern Dancer
Sire Dansili (GB) 1996	Danehill (IUSA); 1986	Danzig	Pas de Nom
Sire Dansili (GB) 1996	Danehill (IUSA); 1986	Razyana	His Majesty
Sire Dansili (GB) 1996	Danehill (IUSA); 1986	Razyana	Spring Adieu
Sire Dansili (GB) 1996	Hasili (IRE); 1991	Kahyasi	Ile de Bourbon
Sire Dansili (GB) 1996	Hasili (IRE); 1991	Kahyasi	Kadissya
Sire Dansili (GB) 1996	Hasili (IRE); 1991	Kerali	High Line
Sire Dansili (GB) 1996	Hasili (IRE); 1991	Kerali	Sookera
Dam Dance Routine (GB) 1999	Sadler's Wells (USA); 1981	Northern Dancer	Nearctic
Dam Dance Routine (GB) 1999	Sadler's Wells (USA); 1981	Northern Dancer	Natalma
Dam Dance Routine (GB) 1999	Sadler's Wells (USA); 1981	Fairy Bridge	Bold Reason
Dam Dance Routine (GB) 1999	Sadler's Wells (USA); 1981	Fairy Bridge	Special
Dam Dance Routine (GB) 1999	Apogee (GB); 1990	Shirley Heights	Mill Reef
Dam Dance Routine (GB) 1999	Apogee (GB); 1990	Shirley Heights	Hardiemma
Dam Dance Routine (GB) 1999	Apogee (GB); 1990	Bourbon Girl	Ile de Bourbon
Dam Dance Routine (GB) 1999	Apogee (GB); 1990	Bourbon Girl	Fleet Girl (Family 4-m)

- Flintshire is inbred 4 × 3 to Northern Dancer, meaning that this stallion appears in both the fourth and third generations of his pedigree.
- Flintshire is inbred 4 × 4 to Ile De Bourbon, meaning that this stallion appears twice in the fourth generation of his pedigree.
