= Exclusive (horse) =

British-bred Thoroughbred racehorse

- Sire: Polar Falcon
- Grandsire: Nureyev
- Dam: Exclusive Order
- Damsire: Exclusive Native
- Sex: Mare
- Foaled: 8 April 1995
- Country: United Kingdom
- Colour: Chestnut
- Breeder: Cheveley Park Stud
- Owner: Cheveley Park Stud
- Trainer: Michael Stoute
- Record: 6: 2-0-2
- Earnings: £172,697

Major wins
- Coronation Stakes (1998)

Exclusive (foaled 8 April 1995) was a British Thoroughbred racehorse and broodmare. As a juvenile, she won a strongly-contested race on her debut and the finished third in the Fillies' Mile. As a three-year-old in 1998 she finished third in the classic 1000 Guineas before recording her biggest win in the Coronation Stakes at Royal Ascot. After her retirement from racing, she became a very successful broodmare, being the ancestor of major winners including Chic and Integral.

== Background ==
Exclusive was a chestnut mare with a white blaze and four white socks bred by her owner the Cheveley Park Stud. She was sired by Polar Falcon, an American-bred stallion who won the Lockinge Stakes and the Haydock Sprint Cup in 1991. As a breeding stallion his most influential offspring was Pivotal who won the Nunthorpe Stakes and became a very successful sire.

Exclusive's dam Exclusive Order, was a top-class racemare who won the Prix du Calvados, Prix de la Porte Maillot and Prix Maurice de Gheest. She later became a very successful broodmare, producing the 2000 Guineas winner Entrepreneur and The Oaks runner-up Dance A Dream. The name Exclusive has been used for several other racehorses including the dam of Exclusive Order's sire Exclusive Native.

The filly was sent into training with Michael Stoute at the Freemason Lodge Stables in Newmarket, Suffolk.

== Racing career ==
=== 1997: two-year-old season ===
Exclusive never contested a maiden race, beginning her racing career in a minor stakes event over seven furlongs at Kempton Park Racecourse on 10 September. Starting the 100/30 second favourite, she took the lead two furlongs from the finish and won by one and three-quarter lengths from Celtic Cross with Leggera (later to win the Prix Vermeille and finish second in the Prix de l'Arc de Triomphe) three and a half lengths back in third. In October, Exclusive was moved up in class for the Group One Fillies' Mile at Ascot Racecourse. She started at odds of 5/1, she finished third of the eight runners behind Glorosio and the favourite Jibe with the May Hill Stakes winner Midnight Line in fifth.

=== 1998: three-year-old season ===
On her three-year-old debut, Exclusive started the 2/1 favourite for the Group Three Nell Gwyn Stakes (a trial for the 1000 Guineas) over seven furlongs at Newmarket Racecourse on 14 April, but appeared to be outpaced in the closing stages and finished fifth of the seven runners behind the 33/1 outsider Cloud Castle. Three weeks later she started at odds of 8/1 in a sixteen-runner field for the 185th running of the 1000 Guineas over Newmarket's Rowley Mile course. Ridden for the first time by Walter Swinburn she took the lead three furlongs out and stayed on well after being overtaken to finish third behind Cape Verdi and Shahtoush.

On 17 June at Royal Ascot, Exclusive started the 5/1 second favourite, behind the Poule d'Essai des Pouliches winner Zalaiyka in the Group One Coronation Stakes. The other contenders included the Godolphin runner La Nuit Rose (third in the Irish 1,000 Guineas) and Daunting Lady (Fred Darling Stakes). With Swinburn again in the saddle, she took the lead inside the final furlong and won by 1 1/2 lengths from Zalaiyka, with Winona (winner of the Irish Oaks on her next start) half a length a way in third.

On her final appearance, Exclusive was stepped up in distance and matched against colts and older horses for the first time when she contested the Juddmonte International over 10 1/2 furlongs at York Racecourse in August. After racing keenly in the early stages he was badly hampered in the straight and finished sixth of the nine runners behind One So Wonderful.

== Breeding record ==
Exclusive was retired from racing to become a broodmare for Cheveley Park. She produced at least nine foals and five winners between 2000 and 2011:

- Chic, a chestnut filly, foaled in 2000, sired by Machiavellian. Won six races including the Hungerford Stakes and two editions of the Celebration Mile.
- Echoes, chestnut filly, 2001, by Rainbow Quest. Unraced.
- Echelon, bay filly, 2002, by Danehill. Won nine races including Matron Stakes, Celebration Mile, Princess Elizabeth Stakes (twice), Dahlia Stakes, Chartwell Fillies' Stakes. Dam of Integral
- Excellent, chestnut filly, 2003, by Grand Lodge. Failed to win in two races.
- Panache, colt, 2005, by King's Best. Won three races.
- Expressive, bay mare, 2006, by Falbrav. Won one race.
- De Rigueur, bay colt (later gelded), 2008, by Montjeu. Won eleven races including Old Newton Cup.
- Tubal, bay colt, 2010, by Dalakhani. Unraced.
- Executrix, bay filly, 2011, by Oasis Dream. Failed to win in five races.

== Pedigree ==
Pedigree of Exclusive (GB), chestnut mare, 1995
Sire Polar Falcon (USA) 1987	Nureyev (USA); 1977	Northern Dancer	Nearctic
Sire Polar Falcon (USA) 1987	Nureyev (USA); 1977	Northern Dancer	Natalma
Sire Polar Falcon (USA) 1987	Nureyev (USA); 1977	Special	Forli
Sire Polar Falcon (USA) 1987	Nureyev (USA); 1977	Special	Thong
Sire Polar Falcon (USA) 1987	Marie d'Argonne (FR); 1981	Jefferson	Charlottesville
Sire Polar Falcon (USA) 1987	Marie d'Argonne (FR); 1981	Jefferson	Monticella
Sire Polar Falcon (USA) 1987	Marie d'Argonne (FR); 1981	Mohair	Blue Tom
Sire Polar Falcon (USA) 1987	Marie d'Argonne (FR); 1981	Mohair	Imberline
Dam Exclusive Order (USA) 1979	Exclusive Native (USA); 1965	Raise a Native	Native Dancer
Dam Exclusive Order (USA) 1979	Exclusive Native (USA); 1965	Raise a Native	Raise You
Dam Exclusive Order (USA) 1979	Exclusive Native (USA); 1965	Exclusive	Shut Out
Dam Exclusive Order (USA) 1979	Exclusive Native (USA); 1965	Exclusive	Good Example
Dam Exclusive Order (USA) 1979	Bonavista (USA); 1964	Dead Ahead	Turn-To
Dam Exclusive Order (USA) 1979	Bonavista (USA); 1964	Dead Ahead	Siama
Dam Exclusive Order (USA) 1979	Bonavista (USA); 1964	Ribotina	Ribot
Dam Exclusive Order (USA) 1979	Bonavista (USA); 1964	Ribotina	French Polish (Family: 6-e)
