= 2013 Epsom Derby =

- Derby
- Location: Epsom Downs Racecourse
- Date: 1 June 2013
- Winning horse: Ruler of the World
- Starting price: 7/1 3rd Fav
- Jockey: Ryan Moore
- Trainer: Aidan O'Brien
- Owner: Sue Magnier / Michael Tabor / Derrick Smith
- Conditions: Good to firm

Epsom Derby 2013
1-2-3
Ruler Of The World	Libertarian	Galileo Rock

Also Ran
4-5-6
Battle Of Marengo	Ocovango	Mars
7-8-9
Chopin	Flying The Flag	Mirsaale
10-11-12
Festive Cheer	Ocean Applause	Dawn Approach

The 2013 Epsom Derby (known as the Investec Derby for sponsorship reasons) was the 234th annual running of the Derby horse race. It took place at Epsom Downs Racecourse on 1 June 2013.

The race was won by Ruler of the World, at odds of 7/1 ridden by jockey Ryan Moore. The winner gave Aidan O'Brien his fourth success and was the first horse since Shergar to win both the Chester Vase and the Derby. The favourite Dawn Approach finished last of the twelve runners.

== Race synopsis ==
Dawn Approach, who had been sired by 2008 Derby winner New Approach, was a 5-4 favorite leading into the race, having won the 2013 2000 Guineas Stakes, the first leg of Britain's Triple Crown, by 5 lengths. The only other horse from the 2000 Guineas was Mars, going off at 12–1. Appearing in his third race was Ruler of the World, who did not race as a two-year-old, but he won his first race, a maiden race at Curragh by 3 1/2 lengths and also took the Chester Vase by six lengths. Ruler of the World went off at 7-1 odds.

Present for the race, as in years past, was Queen Elizabeth II, along with a crowd of 18,237. Favourite Dawn Approach would be ridden by Kevin Manning, who had also ridden his father New Approach to the 2008 Derby win. Ruler of the World, who would go on to win this year's Derby, was ridden by Ryan Moore, after fellow jockey Joseph O'Brien elected to ride Battle of Marengo. Both Battle of Marengo and Ruler of the World were trained by Aidan O'Brien from Ballydoyle, who is Joseph's father. O'Brien would train five of the twelve horses in the race, also including Mars, Flying the Flag, and Festive Cheer.

At the start of the race, favourite Dawn Approach showed little discipline, and was out of the running by the first furlong. Though he led briefly at the one-mile mark, he would fall to the back of the pack and finished last, half a length behind Ocean Applause. Early in the straight Ruler of the World overtook his stable companion Battle of Marengo and established a clear advantage which he maintained throughout the final quarter mile and won by a length and a half. Libertarian finished strongly, overtaking several horses in the closing strides to finish second ahead of Galileo Rock and Battle of Marengo.

Following the race, winning jockey Ryan Moore stated "I planned to be a bit closer but I just didn’t get away very well —- it was a very messy race." Trainer Aiden O'Brien, on winning his fifth Derby stated that Ruler of the World "quickened up well that day and won like a very good horse."

== Race details ==
- Sponsor: Investec
- Winner's prize money: £782,314
- Going: Good
- Number of runners: 12
- Winner's time: 2 minutes, 39.06 seconds

== Full result ==
	Dist *	Horse	Jockey	Trainer	SP
1		Ruler of the World	Ryan Moore	Aidan O'Brien	7-1
2	1½	Libertarian	William Buick	Elaine Burke	14-1
3	shd	Galileo Rock	Wayne Lordan	David Wachman	25-1
4	shd	Battle of Marengo	Joseph O'Brien	Aidan O'Brien	11-2
5	½	Ocovango	Pierre-Charles Boudot	André Fabre	8-1
6	1½	Mars	Richard Hughes	Aidan O'Brien	12-1
7	nse	Chopin	Jamie Spencer	Andreas Wohler	12-1
8	2¼	Flying the Flag	Colm O'Donoghue	Aidan O'Brien	66-1
9	1¼	Mirsaale	Neil Callan	James Tate	50-1
10	4½	Festive Cheer	Seamie Heffernan	Aidan O'Brien	25-1
11	21	Ocean Applause	Daragh O'Donohoe	John Ryan	200-1
12	½	Dawn Approach	Kevin Manning	Jim Bolger	5-4 F

== Winner details ==
Further details of the winner, Ruler of the World:

- Foaled: 17 March 2010, in Ireland
- Sire: Galileo; Dam: Love Me True (Kingmambo)
- Owner: Derrick Smith, Sue Magnier and Michael Tabor
- Breeder: Southern Bloodstock

== Form analysis ==
=== Two-year-old races ===
Notable runs by the future Derby participants as two-year-olds in 2012:

- Dawn Approach – 1st in Coventry Stakes, 1st in Vincent O'Brien Stakes, 1st in Dewhurst Stakes
- Battle of Marengo – 1st in Beresford Stakes

=== The road to Epsom ===
Early-season appearances in 2013 and trial races prior to running in the Derby:

- Dawn Approach – 1st in 2000 Guineas
- Ruler of the World – 1st in Chester Vase
- Libertarian – 1st in Dante Stakes
- Battle of Marengo – 1st in Ballysax Stakes, 1st in Derrinstown Stud Derby Trial
- Ocavango – 1st in Prix Greffulhe
- Chopin – 1st in Dr. Busch-Memorial
- Festive Cheer – 2nd in Prix Hocquart

=== Subsequent Group 1 wins ===
Group 1 / Grade I victories after running in the Derby:

- Dawn Approach – St. James's Palace Stakes (2013)

== Subsequent breeding careers ==
Leading progeny of participants in the 2013 Epsom Derby.

=== Sires of Group/Grade One winners ===
Ruler of the World (1st)

- Iridessa – 1st Fillies' Mile (2018), 1st Matron Stakes, 1st Pretty Polly Stakes (Ireland), 1st Breeders' Cup Filly & Mare Turf (2019)

=== Other Stallions ===
Dawn Approach (12th) – Musis Amica (2nd Prix De Diane 2018), Mary Tudor (3rd Irish Oaks 2018), Madhmoon (2nd Epsom Derby (2019)
Ocovango (5th) – Langer Dan – 1st Wensleydale Juvenile Hurdle (2019)
Battle Of Marengo (4th) – Sired flat and jumps winners
Libertarian (2nd) – Offspring yet to race, several sold as stores
Flying The Flag (8th) – Exported to South Africa
