= Oh So Sharp Stakes =

Flat horse race in Britain

- Class: Group 3
- Location: Rowley Mile; Newmarket, England
- Inaugurated: 1987
- Race type: Flat / Thoroughbred
- Sponsor: Godolphin
- Website: Newmarket

Race information
- Distance: 7f (1,408 metres)
- Surface: Turf
- Track: Straight
- Qualification: Two-year-old fillies
- Weight: 9 st 2 lb Penalties; 5 lb for G1 / G2 winners 3 lb for G3 winners
- Purse: £65,000 (2025); 1st: £34,026

Oh So Sharp Stakes
2026
Lola De Valence	Sweltering	Topaz

Previous years
2025
Calendar Girl	Mubasimah	Senorita Vega
2024
Merrily	Cathedral	Flight
2023
Dance Sequence	Skellet	Star Music
2022
Midnight Mile	Lose Yourself	Small Oasis
2021
Fast Attack	Allayaali	Perfect News

2020-2011
2020
Saffron Beach	Thank You Next	Shine For You
2019
Rose Of Kildare	Valeria Messalina	Separate
2018
Mot Juste	Angel's Hideaway	Sunday Star
2017
Altyn Orda	Gavota	I Can Fly
2016
Poet's Vanity	Glitter Girl	Unforgetable Filly
2015
First Victory	Alamode	Robanne
2014
Local Time	Astrelle	Prize Exhibit
2013
Miss France	Lightning Thunder	Sweet Acclaim
2012
Waterway Run	Light Up My Life	Annie's Fortune
2011
Alsindi	Questing	Nayarra

2010-2001
2010
Havant	Look At Me	Khawlah
2009
Tabassum	Electric Feel	Hasty
2008
Souter's Sister	Moonlife	Nashmiah
2007
Raymi Coya	Step Softly	Annie Skates
2006
Selinka	Puggy	Guarantia
2005
Race For The Stars	Scottish Stage	Tiana
2004
Penkenna Princess	Favourita	Borthwick Girl
2003
Top Romance	Spotlight	Kelucia
2002
Khulood	Soldera	Miss Assertive
2001
Protectress	Snowfire	Islington

2000-1991
2000
Lilium	Nafisah	Lil's Jessy
1999
Agrippina	High Walden	Tabheej
1998
Smittenby	Fragrant Oasis	Hula Angel
1997
Name Of Love	Flawless	Shuhrah
1996
Sarayir	Fernanda	Dancing Drop
1995
Ruznama	Obsessive	Fag End
1994
Hiwaya	Germane	Poppy Carew
1993
Bulaxie	Lady Fairfax	Mild Rebuke
1992
Yawl	Rumpus	Self Assured
1991
Rose Indien	Enaya	Pericolo

1990-1988
1990
Dartrey	Diamond City	Kafiyah
1989
Va Toujours	Royal Fi Fi	Flower Girl
1988
Arsaan	Alsabiha	Priceless Pearl

The Oh So Sharp Stakes is a Group 3 flat horse race in Great Britain open to two-year-old fillies. It is run on the Rowley Mile at Newmarket over a distance of 7 furlongs (1,408 metres), and it is scheduled to take place each year in October.

== History ==
The event is named after Oh So Sharp, a Newmarket-trained winner of the fillies' Triple Crown in 1985. It was established in 1987, and it was initially an ungraded conditions race. It was given Listed status in 1993, and promoted to Group 3 level in 2007.

The race was previously held on the second day of Newmarket's three-day Cambridgeshire Meeting, the day before the Cambridgeshire Handicap, but was moved to a fixture a week later in 2014. From 2015 it was moved back a further week to become part of the Future Champions Festival at Newmarket.

== Records ==
Leading jockey (4 wins):

- Richard Hills – Hiwaya (1994), Sarayir (1996), Khulood (2002), Tabassum (2009)

Leading trainer (6 wins):

- Sir Michael Stoute – Arsaan (1988), Dartrey (1990), Lilium (2000), Top Romance (2003), Tabassum (2009), Havant (2010)

== Winners ==
Year	Winner	Jockey	Trainer	Time
1987	Intimate Guest	Steve Cauthen	Henry Cecil	1:27.35
1988	Arsaan	Tony Kimberley	Michael Stoute	1:28.20
1989	Va Toujours	Mark Rimmer	Hugh Collingridge	1:25.44
1990	Dartrey	Walter Swinburn	Michael Stoute	1:25.56
1991	Rose Indien	Tony Cruz	Mohammed Moubarak	1:24.21
1992	Yawl	Darryll Holland	Barry Hills	1:28.98
1993	Bulaxie	Willie Carson	John Dunlop	1:31.98
1994	Hiwaya	Richard Hills	Harry Thomson Jones	1:29.07
1995	Ruznama	Willie Carson	Barry Hills	1:25.33
1996	Sarayir	Richard Hills	Dick Hern	1:24.05
1997	Name of Love	Kieren Fallon	David Loder	1:24.22
1998	Smittenby	Simon Whitworth	Nerys Dutfield	1:27.74
1999	Agrippina	Pat Eddery	Alan Bailey	1:29.14
2000	Lilium	Jimmy Fortune	Sir Michael Stoute	1:26.47
2001	Protectress	Richard Quinn	Henry Cecil	1:26.61
2002	Khulood	Richard Hills	John Dunlop	1:23.02
2003	Top Romance	Jamie Spencer	Sir Michael Stoute	1:24.22
2004	Penkenna Princess	Paul Hanagan	Ralph Beckett	1:26.22
2005	Race for the Stars	Kieren Fallon	Aidan O'Brien	1:25.47
2006	Selinka	Ryan Moore	Richard Hannon Sr.	1:28.28
2007	Raymi Coya	Kerrin McEvoy	Marco Botti	1:27.51
2008	Souter's Sister	Jimmy Fortune	Richard Hannon Sr.	1:22.47
2009	Tabassum	Richard Hills	Sir Michael Stoute	1:23.90
2010	Havant	Ryan Moore	Sir Michael Stoute	1:28.74
2011	Alsindi	Tom Queally	Clive Brittain	1:24.46
2012	Waterway Run	Jim Crowley	Ralph Beckett	1:23.86
2013	Miss France	Mickael Barzalona	André Fabre	1:24.98
2014	Local Time	James Doyle	Saeed bin Suroor	1:25.26
2015	First Victory	William Buick	Saeed bin Suroor	1:26.39
2016	Poet's Vanity	Oisin Murphy	Andrew Balding	1:25.47
2017	Altyn Orda	Andrea Atzeni	Roger Varian	1:23.71
2018	Mot Juste	William Buick	Roger Varian	1:26.36
2019	Rose Of Kildare	Joe Fanning	Mark Johnston	1.25.01
2020	Saffron Beach	Adam Kirby	Jane Chapple-Hyam	1:27.00
2021	Fast Attack	James Doyle	Simon & Ed Crisford	1:26.52
2022	Midnight Mile	Oisin Orr	Richard Fahey	1:24.75
2023	Dance Sequence	William Buick	Charlie Appleby	1:26.08
2024	Merrily	Wayne Lordan	Aidan O'Brien	1:25.53
2025	Calendar Girl	Callum Rodriguez	Owen Burrows	1:23.28
2026	Lola De Valance	Saffie Osborne	Rod Millman	1:23.55

== See also ==
- Horse racing in Great Britain
- List of British flat horse races
