= Ectot =

French-bred Thoroughbred racehorse

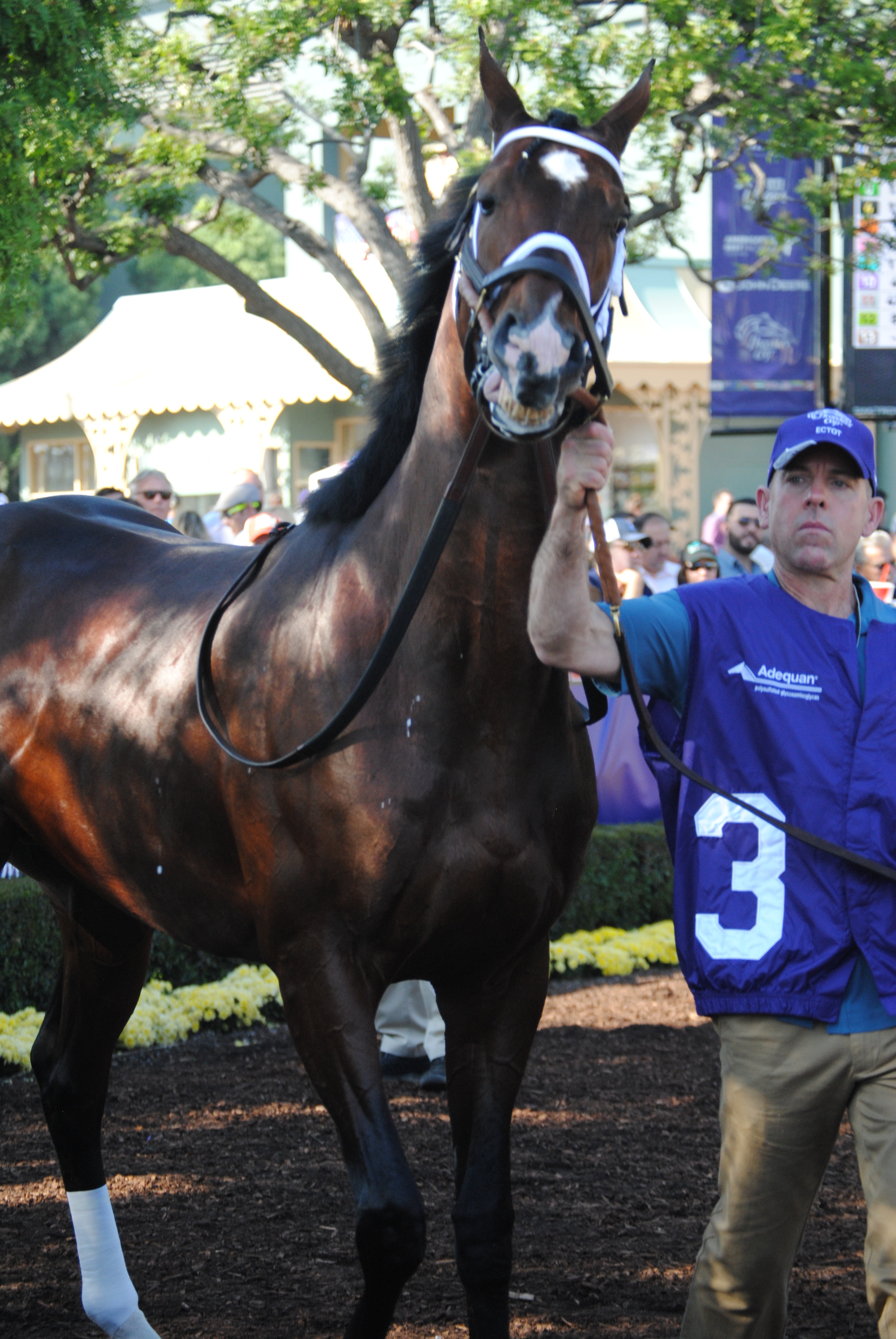
- Ectot before the 2016 Breeders' Cup Turf
- Sire: Hurricane Run
- Grandsire: Montjeu
- Dam: Tonnara
- Damsire: Linamix
- Sex: Colt
- Foaled: 8 February 2011
- Country: France
- Colour: Bay
- Breeder: Skymarc Farm Inc & Ecurie des Monceaux
- Owner: Gerard Augustin-Normand & Elisabeth Vidal; Al Shaqab Racing
- Trainer: Élie Lellouche; Todd Pletcher
- Record: 14:7-2-1
- Earnings: £532,623

Major wins
- Prix des Chênes (2013); Critérium International (2013); Prix de Fontainebleau (2014); Prix Niel (2014); Joe Hirsch Turf Classic Invitational Stakes (2016)

Ectot (foaled 8 February 2011) is a French Thoroughbred racehorse. After finishing second on his debut, he won his remaining four starts as a two-year-old in 2013 including the Prix des Chênes and the Critérium International. In the following year he won the Prix de Fontainebleau and returned after injury to win the Prix Niel. He failed to win at four but returned to form when transferred to the United States in 2016, winning the Joe Hirsch Turf Classic Invitational Stakes.

== Background ==
Ectot is a bay horse with a white star and a white sock on his left front foot bred in France by Skymarc Farm Inc & Ecurie des Monceaux. He is the most successful horse sired to date by the Prix de l'Arc de Triomphe winner Hurricane Run who currently stands as a breeding stallion at the Getut Ammerland in Germany. Ectot's dam Tonnara finished unplaced in both her races but has become a very successful broodmare, having previously produced the St James's Palace Stakes winner Most Improved. As a descendant of outstanding sprinter Myrobella, Tonnara was distantly related to Big Game, Snow Knight and Chamossaire.

As a yearling, Ectot was offered for sale at Deauville in August 2012 and bought for €75,000 by Sylvain Vidal, part owner of the Haras de la Cauvinière. The colt initially raced in the ownership of Vidal's wife Elisabeth and Gérard Augustin-Normand. Ectot was sent into training with Élie Lellouche and has been ridden in all of his races by Gregory Benoist.

== Racing career ==
=== 2013: two-year-old season ===
Ectot began his racing career in a race on very soft ground over 1400 metres at Compiègne Racecourse on 1 July in which he started the 3/1 favourite and finished second, beaten one and a half lengths by Karakontie. The winner went on to take the Prix Jean-Luc Lagardère and the Poule d'Essai des Poulains. At the end of the month, over the same distance, Ectot recorded his first success when he defeated Under The Radar by one and a half lengths in the Prix Matahawk at Clairefontaine. In August, the colt was moved up in class and distance for the Listed Critérium du Fonds Européen de l'Elevage over 1600 metres at Deauville Racecourse and won by a "short neck" and two and a half lengths from Baby Foot and Elliptique.

Ectot was again progressed in class to contest the Group Three Prix des Chênes at Longchamp Racecourse and started 6/5 favourite against four opponents including Under The Radar, Elliptique and the Aga Khan's colt Daraybi. Ectot took the lead approaching the final 200 metres and accelerated clear to win very easily by three lengths from Elliptique. On his final appearance of the year, Ectot started 7/10 favourite for the Group One Critérium International over 1600 metres on very soft ground at Saint-Cloud Racecourse on 1 November. Benoist attempted to restrain him win the early stages, but allowed him to go to the front after 400 metres. Ectot was challenged in the straight but stayed on to win by three quarter of a length and a short neck from Earnshaw and Prestige Vendôme.

=== 2014: three-year-old season ===
Ectot began his second season in the Group Three Prix Fontainebleau at Longchamp on 13 April in which he started second favourite behind Karakontie. He raced in second place before taking the lead in the straight and held off a challenge from Karakontie to win by a neck with a gap of three and a half lengths back to Galiway in third. After the race, the colt was regarded as a leading contender for the Poule d'Essai des Poulains and was also fancied for The Derby, but sustained an injury in training and did not reappear until autumn.

Before his next race, Ectot was acquired for an undisclosed sum by Al Shaqab Racing the racing organisation owned by the Qatari Sheikh Joaan Al Thani. On 14 September, after five months off the course. Ectot started the 15/8 favourite for the Prix Niel, a trial race for the Prix de l'Arc de Triomphe. Benoist restrained the horse at the back of the eight runners field before making progress on the outside in the straight. He took the lead over 200 metres from the finish and won by a neck from Teletext, with the Aidan O'Brien-trained Adelaide in third and Elliptique in fourth. On 5 October, Ectot started the 6.7/1 third favourite behind Taghrooda and Avenir Certain for the 93rd running of the Pri de l'Arc de Triomphe. He pulled hard against Benoist's attempts to restrain him in the early stages and never looked likely to win, finishing seventeenth of the twenty runners behind Treve.

=== 2015: four-year-old season ===
Ectot remained in training as a four-year-old but made only three appearances and failed to win in a season interrupted by injury. He finished last of nine in the Prince of Wales's Stakes, third in La Coupe de Maisons-Laffitte and seventh in the Prix du Conseil de Paris.

=== 2016: five-year-old season ===
In 2016 Ectot was moved to the United States where he was trained by Todd Pletcher. He began his North American career by finishing fourth in the Lure Stakes at Saratoga Race Course on 6 August and then ran second in an allowance race at the same track on 4 September. On 1 October Ectot contested the Grade I Joe Hirsch Turf Classic Invitational Stakes over one and a half miles on rain-softened turf at Belmont Park and started the 9.4/1 third choice in the betting. His three opponents were the 1/5 favourite Flintshire, Money Multiplier and Twilight Eclipse (Man o' War Stakes). Ridden by José Ortiz he led from the start and drew away from his rivals in the straight to win by five lengths from Flintshire. Pletcher commented "He's trained exceptionally well for us since he came in... His races leading up to this were sneaky good and he seemed to be improving. We made some minor adjustments with equipment and shoes and figured it out as we went along... We're delighted with his efforts today".

== Stud career ==
Ectot was retired to stud and stands at Haras de Bouquetot in France for a service fee of €4,000. His first progeny began racing in 2021.

== Pedigree ==
Pedigree of Ectot, bay colt, 2011
Sire Hurricane Run (IRE) 2002	Montjeu (IRE); 1996	Sadler's Wells	Northern Dancer
Sire Hurricane Run (IRE) 2002	Montjeu (IRE); 1996	Sadler's Wells	Fairy Bridge
Sire Hurricane Run (IRE) 2002	Montjeu (IRE); 1996	Floripedes	Top Ville
Sire Hurricane Run (IRE) 2002	Montjeu (IRE); 1996	Floripedes	Toute Cy
Sire Hurricane Run (IRE) 2002	Hold On (GER); 1991	Surumu	Literat
Sire Hurricane Run (IRE) 2002	Hold On (GER); 1991	Surumu	Surama
Sire Hurricane Run (IRE) 2002	Hold On (GER); 1991	Hone	Sharpen Up
Sire Hurricane Run (IRE) 2002	Hold On (GER); 1991	Hone	Lucy
Dam Tannara (IRE) 2003	Linamix (FR); 1987	Mendez	Bellypha
Dam Tannara (IRE) 2003	Linamix (FR); 1987	Mendez	Miss Carina
Dam Tannara (IRE) 2003	Linamix (FR); 1987	Lunadix	Breton
Dam Tannara (IRE) 2003	Linamix (FR); 1987	Lunadix	Lutine
Dam Tannara (IRE) 2003	Mahalia (IRE); 1993	Danehill	Danzig
Dam Tannara (IRE) 2003	Mahalia (IRE); 1993	Danehill	Razyana
Dam Tannara (IRE) 2003	Mahalia (IRE); 1993	Maresca	Mill Reef
Dam Tannara (IRE) 2003	Mahalia (IRE); 1993	Maresca	Caprera (Family 6-e)
