= Marvellous (horse) =

Irish-bred Thoroughbred racehorse

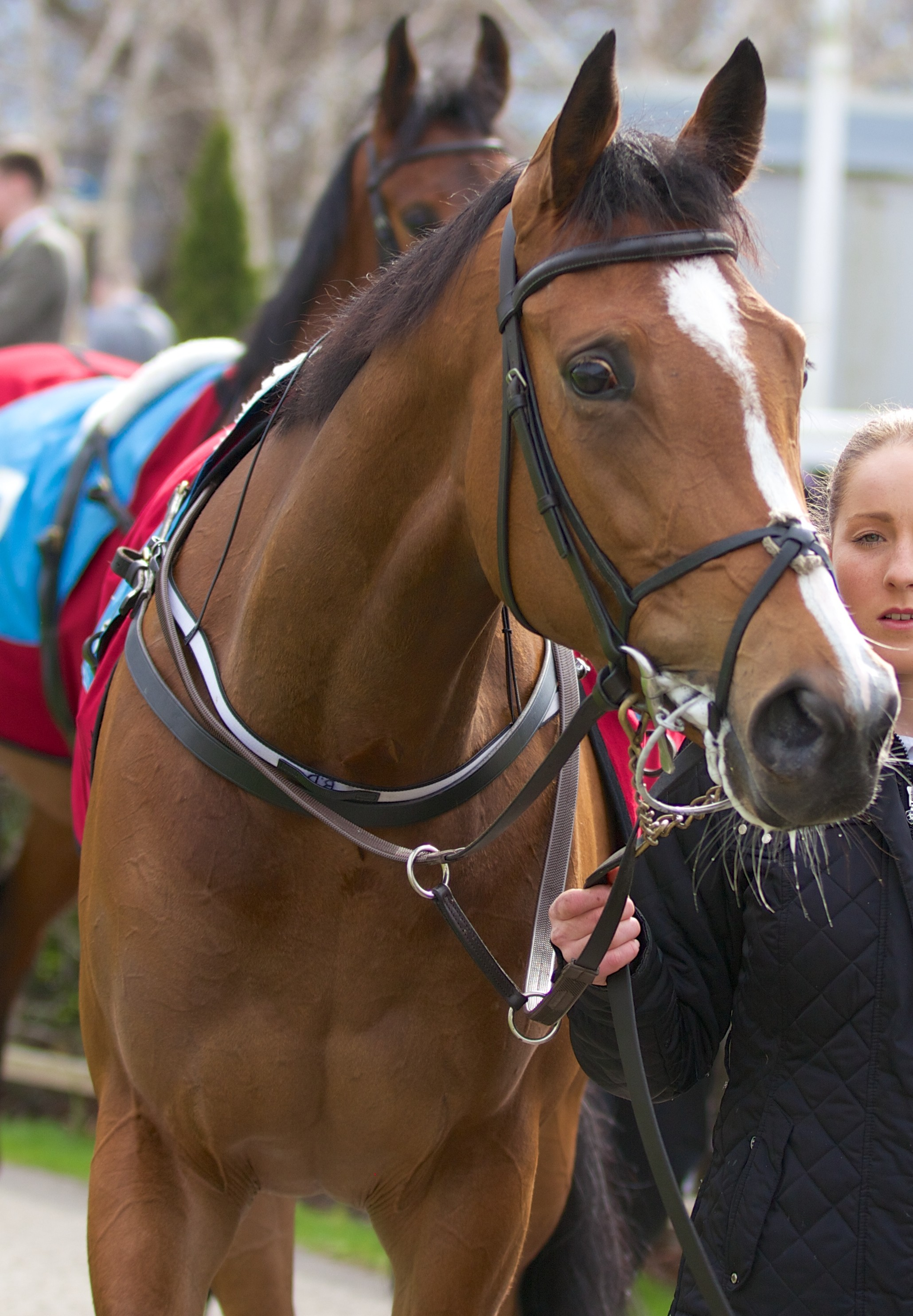
- Marvellous at Leopardstown on 30 March 2014
- Sire: Galileo
- Grandsire: Sadler's Wells
- Dam: You'resothrilling
- Damsire: Storm Cat
- Sex: Filly
- Foaled: 9 January 2011
- Country: Ireland
- Colour: Bay
- Breeder: You'resothrilling Syndicate
- Owner: Derrick Smith; Susan Magnier; Michael Tabor
- Trainer: Aidan O'Brien
- Jockey: Joseph O'Brien; Seamie Heffernan; Ryan Moore
- Record: 4: 2–0–0
- Earnings: £160,222

Major wins
- Irish 1,000 Guineas (2014)

Marvellous (foaled 9 January 2011) is an Irish Thoroughbred racehorse who won the Irish 1,000 Guineas at The Curragh by three lengths. She is trained by Aidan O'Brien and owned by Derrick Smith, Susan Magnier and Michael Tabor.

== Background ==
Marvellous is a bay filly bred by the You'resothrilling Syndicate and foaled on 9 January 2011. She was sired by Galileo, who won the Derby, Irish Derby and King George VI and Queen Elizabeth Stakes in 2001. Galileo is now one of the world's leading stallions and has been champion sire of Great Britain and Ireland five times. His other progeny include Cape Blanco, Frankel, Golden Lilac, Nathaniel, New Approach, Rip Van Winkle and Ruler of the World. Marvellous's dam is You'resothrilling, a daughter of Storm Cat was a sister of the leading racehorse and stallion Giant's Causeway. You'resothrilling was trained by Aidan O'Brien and won the Cherry Hinton Stakes in 2007. Marvellous, who is You'resothrilling's first foal, is owned by Derrick Smith, Susan Magnier and Michael Tabor, and is trained by Aidan O'Brien.

== Racing career ==
=== 2013: Two-year-old season ===
Marvellous made her racecourse debut on 9 October 2013, when she was one of fifteen runners in a one-mile maiden race for fillies at Navan. Jockey Joseph O'Brien held her up near the rear of the field in the early stages of the race. When the field had two furlongs left to run she had moved through the field to sixth place, before challenging the leaders in the final furlong. Marvellous took the lead near the finish and won by half a length from the Dermot Weld trained filly I'm Yours.

=== 2014: Three-year-old season ===
Marvellous returned to the racetrack as a three-year-old for the Leopardstown 1,000 Guineas Trial Stakes, where she finished in sixth place, about four lengths behind stablemate Bracelet, who won the race. Marvellous then faced ten opponents in the Irish 1,000 Guineas at The Curragh, where she started at the price of 10/1 and was ridden by Ryan Moore. She was in the rear of the field for most of the race and was in last place at the halfway point. However, she closed the gap to the leaders to challenge for the lead inside the final furlong, before pulling clear to win by three lengths from pre-race favourite Lightning Thunder. Vote Often finished over four lengths behind the runner-up in third place. Marvellous's next race was the Oaks at Epsom Downs, where she was ridden by Joseph O'Brien and started as the 4/1 favourite. She raced near the middle of the 17-runner field in the early stages of the race. Marvellous made some progress, but could never get to the leaders and finished in sixth place, over eight lengths behind winner Taghrooda.

== Pedigree ==
Pedigree of Marvellous, bay filly, 2011
Sire Galileo (IRE) b. 1998	Sadler's Wells (USA) b. 1981	Northern Dancer* b. 1961	Nearctic
Sire Galileo (IRE) b. 1998	Sadler's Wells (USA) b. 1981	Northern Dancer* b. 1961	Natalma
Sire Galileo (IRE) b. 1998	Sadler's Wells (USA) b. 1981	Fairy Bridge b. 1975	Bold Reason
Sire Galileo (IRE) b. 1998	Sadler's Wells (USA) b. 1981	Fairy Bridge b. 1975	Special
Sire Galileo (IRE) b. 1998	Urban Sea (USA) ch. 1989	Miswaki ch. 1978	Mr. Prospector
Sire Galileo (IRE) b. 1998	Urban Sea (USA) ch. 1989	Miswaki ch. 1978	Hopespringseternal
Sire Galileo (IRE) b. 1998	Urban Sea (USA) ch. 1989	Allegretta ch. 1978	Lombard
Sire Galileo (IRE) b. 1998	Urban Sea (USA) ch. 1989	Allegretta ch. 1978	Anatevka
Dam You'resothrilling (USA) b. 2005	Storm Cat (USA) b. 1983	Storm Bird b. 1978	Northern Dancer*
Dam You'resothrilling (USA) b. 2005	Storm Cat (USA) b. 1983	Storm Bird b. 1978	South Ocean
Dam You'resothrilling (USA) b. 2005	Storm Cat (USA) b. 1983	Terlingua ch. 1976	Secretariat
Dam You'resothrilling (USA) b. 2005	Storm Cat (USA) b. 1983	Terlingua ch. 1976	Crimson Saint
Dam You'resothrilling (USA) b. 2005	Mariah's Storm (USA) b. 1991	Rahy ch. 1985	Blushing Groom
Dam You'resothrilling (USA) b. 2005	Mariah's Storm (USA) b. 1991	Rahy ch. 1985	Glorious Song
Dam You'resothrilling (USA) b. 2005	Mariah's Storm (USA) b. 1991	Immense b. 1979	Roberto
Dam You'resothrilling (USA) b. 2005	Mariah's Storm (USA) b. 1991	Immense b. 1979	Imsodear (Family 11)

Note: b. = Bay, br. = Brown, ch. = Chestnut

* Marvellous is inbred 3 × 4 to the stallion Northern Dancer, meaning that Northern Dancer appears once in the third generation and once in the fourth generation of his pedigree.
