= Rizeena =

Irish-bred Thoroughbred racehorse

- Racing silks of Sheikh Rashid Dalmook Al Maktoum
- Sire: Iffraaj
- Grandsire: Zafonic
- Dam: Serena's Storm
- Damsire: Statue of Liberty
- Sex: Filly
- Foaled: 24 March 2011
- Country: Ireland
- Colour: Bay
- Breeder: Roundhill Stud
- Owner: Sheikh Rashid Dalmook Al Maktoum
- Trainer: Clive Brittain
- Jockey: Frederik Tylicki; Ryan Moore; James Doyle; Richard Hughes; Olivier Peslier
- Record: 11: 5–3–1
- Earnings: £527,240

Major wins
- National Stakes (2013); Queen Mary Stakes (2013); Moyglare Stud Stakes (2013); Coronation Stakes (2014)

Rizeena (foaled 24 March 2011) is an Irish-bred, British-trained Thoroughbred racehorse. As a two-year-old she won the Queen Mary Stakes at Royal Ascot, before going on to win the Group 1 Moyglare Stud Stakes later in the year, and in 2014 she won the Coronation Stakes. She is owned by Sheikh Rashid Dalmook Al Maktoum and trained by Clive Brittain.

== Background ==
Rizeena is a bay filly bred by Roundhill Stud and foaled on 24 March 2011. She was sired by Iffraaj, who won the Group 2 Park Stakes twice and the Lennox Stakes once, as well as finishing second in the 2006 July Cup. Along with Rizeena, he has also sired Benvenue, Chriselliam, Hot Streak and Wootton Bassett. Rizeena's dam is Serena's Storm, a race-winning daughter of Statue of Liberty. In 2011, Rizeena was sold at the Tattersalls October Yearlings Sale for a fee of 50,000 guineas. She is owned by Sheikh Rashid Dalmook Al Maktoum and trained by Clive Brittain.

== Racing career ==
=== 2013: Two-year-old season ===
Rizeena made her racecourse debut on 18 April 2013, when she contested a five-furlong maiden race at Newmarket. She finished the race in fifth place, about two lengths behind winner Fire Blaze. On 10 May, Rizeena won a five-furlong maiden at Ascot, when she beat runner-up Oriel by 1 3/4 lengths. Rizeena's next start came in the Listed National Stakes, which is run over five furlongs and six yards at Sandown Park. Jockey Ryan Moore sent her into the lead from the start, and pulled clear with a furlong still to run to win by three lengths from Andhesontherun. At Royal Ascot, Rizeena contested the Queen Mary Stakes, where she faced 22 opponents and started as the 6/1 third-favourite, with Marygate Stakes winner Beldale Memory being sent off the 4/1 favourite. Rizeena, who was this time ridden by James Doyle, raced in the middle of the pack in the early stages. After making steady progress from over two furlongs out, she ran on in the final furlong to take the lead with 100 yards left to run, and won the race by two lengths from the Wesley Ward-trained Sweet Emma Rose, who was a further length ahead of third-placed One Chance.

On 12 July, Rizeena started favourite for the Duchess of Cambridge Stakes. She stumbled leaving the starting stalls, but recovered to race in the midfield. She was chasing the leaders when being carried left by another horse inside the penultimate furlong, but stayed on in the last 200 yards to finish second, 2 1/4 lengths behind winner Lucky Kristale. Rizeena then traveled to France for the Group 1 Prix Morny, where she was held up at the rear of the field by Ryan Moore. She ran on well inside the final furlong to finish in third place, about 1 3/4 lengths behind the winner. The race was won by No Nay Never, who beat Vorda by a length. On 1 September, Rizeena was one of seven fillies to run in the Moyglare Stud Stakes. She was ridden by James Doyle, who settled her just behind the leaders. She was fifth with 1 1/2 furlongs remaining, but stayed on to take the lead from Kiyoshi inside the final 100 yards, winning the race. Kiyoshi finished second, three quarters of a length behind Rizeena, and a head in front of Tapestry, but the stewards reversed the placings of the second and third due to interference. Rizeena's last race as a two-year-old was the Fillies' Mile, when she was ridden by James Doyle again and started as the 7/4 favourite. After being in the midfield in the early stages, she moved through to take the lead as they entered the last furlong, but was overtaken by Chriselliam near the finish. Chriselliam won the race, with Rizeena a length behind her in second place.

=== 2014: Three-year-old season ===
Rizeena's first race as a three-year-old was the 1000 Guineas Stakes on 4 May 2014. After racing in the middle of the field, she made some late progress, but did not challenge the leaders and finished in seventh place behind winner Miss France. Her next race was intended to be the Irish 1,000 Guineas, but a trickle of blood was noticed to be coming from one of her nostrils after working, and Clive Brittain withdrew her from the race. At Royal Ascot, she was one of 12 fillies to contest the Coronation Stakes on 20 June. She was ridden by Ryan Moore, who positioned her just behind the leaders, before taking the lead over a furlong out. She kept the lead until the finish, winning the race by three quarters of a length from Lesstalk In Paris, who just took second place from Euro Charline on the line. On 11 July, Rizeena took on older horses for the first time in the Falmouth Stakes at the Newmarket July Meeting. She moved through to join the leader Sky Lantern before the halfway point of the race and took the lead with three furlongs to run. She was overtaken by Integral one furlong out, who ran on to win by two lengths from Rizeena, who finished second.

== Assessment ==
In 2013, Rizeena achieved an official rating of 113, making her the third highest rated two-year-old filly in Europe, behind only Chriselliam and Vorda.

== Pedigree ==
Pedigree of Rizeena, bay filly, 2011
Sire Iffraaj (IRE) b. 2001	Zafonic (USA) b. 1990	Gone West b. 1984	Mr. Prospector
Sire Iffraaj (IRE) b. 2001	Zafonic (USA) b. 1990	Gone West b. 1984	Secrettame
Sire Iffraaj (IRE) b. 2001	Zafonic (USA) b. 1990	Zaizafon ch. 1982	The Minstrel
Sire Iffraaj (IRE) b. 2001	Zafonic (USA) b. 1990	Zaizafon ch. 1982	Mofida
Sire Iffraaj (IRE) b. 2001	Pastorale (GB) ch. 1988	Nureyev b. 1977	Northern Dancer
Sire Iffraaj (IRE) b. 2001	Pastorale (GB) ch. 1988	Nureyev b. 1977	Special
Sire Iffraaj (IRE) b. 2001	Pastorale (GB) ch. 1988	Park Appeal b. 1982	Ahonoora
Sire Iffraaj (IRE) b. 2001	Pastorale (GB) ch. 1988	Park Appeal b. 1982	Balidaress
Dam Serena's Storm (IRE) gr. 2005	Statue of Liberty (USA) b. 2000	Storm Cat b. 1983	Storm Bird
Dam Serena's Storm (IRE) gr. 2005	Statue of Liberty (USA) b. 2000	Storm Cat b. 1983	Terlingua
Dam Serena's Storm (IRE) gr. 2005	Statue of Liberty (USA) b. 2000	Charming Lassie b. 1987	Seattle Slew
Dam Serena's Storm (IRE) gr. 2005	Statue of Liberty (USA) b. 2000	Charming Lassie b. 1987	Lassie Dear
Dam Serena's Storm (IRE) gr. 2005	Princess Serena (USA) gr. 1999	Unbridled's Song gr. 1993	Unbridled
Dam Serena's Storm (IRE) gr. 2005	Princess Serena (USA) gr. 1999	Unbridled's Song gr. 1993	Trolley Song
Dam Serena's Storm (IRE) gr. 2005	Princess Serena (USA) gr. 1999	Serena's Sister b. 1994	Rahy
Dam Serena's Storm (IRE) gr. 2005	Princess Serena (USA) gr. 1999	Serena's Sister b. 1994	Imagining

Note: b. = Bay, ch. = Chestnut, gr. = Grey
