= Ruler of the World =

Thoroughbred racehorse

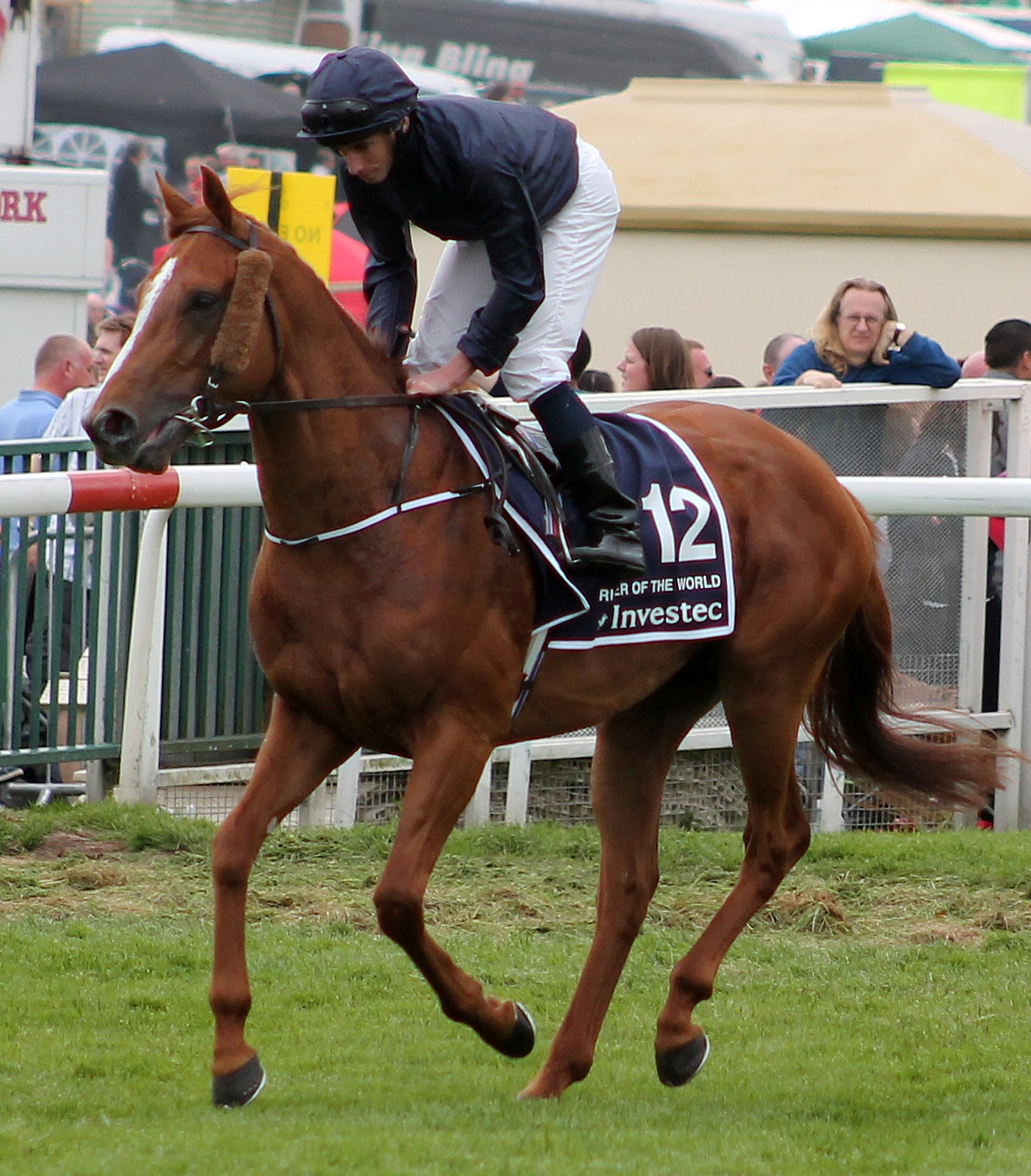
- Ruler of the World at the start of the 2013 Epsom Derby.
- Sire: Galileo
- Grandsire: Sadler's Wells
- Dam: Love Me True
- Damsire: Kingmambo
- Sex: Colt
- Foaled: 17 March 2010
- Country: Ireland
- Colour: Chestnut
- Breeder: Southern Bloodstock
- Owner: Mrs John Magnier; Michael Tabor; Derrick Smith; Al Shaqab Racing
- Trainer: Aidan O'Brien
- Record: 11: 4-1-1
- Earnings: £1,070,243

Major wins
- Chester Vase (2013); Epsom Derby (2013); Prix Foy (2014)

Ruler of the World (foaled 17 March 2010) is an Irish Thoroughbred racehorse who won The Derby in 2013. He was unraced as a two-year-old. In 2013, he won a maiden race at the Curragh and the Group Three Chester Vase before winning the Derby on his third appearance. Later that year, he finished second in the Prix Niel and third in the Champion Stakes. He remained in training as a four-year-old and won the Prix Foy before being retired to stud.

== Background ==
Ruler of the World is a chestnut colt with a narrow white blaze bred in Ireland by Southern Bloodstock, a company associated with the Coolmore Stud. He was sired by Galileo, the winner of the 2001 Derby who went on to become an outstanding breeding stallion, winning the title of champion sire on four occasions. Galileo's other progeny include Rip Van Winkle, Nathaniel, Cape Blanco, New Approach, and Frankel.

Ruler of the World's dam, Love Me True, is a half-sister to Shuailaan (Winter Hill Stakes), Madison's Charm (Comely Stakes), and Bite The Bullet (Sanford Stakes), and, as a granddaughter of Lassie Dear, is closely related to Summer Squall, A.P. Indy, and Lemon Drop Kid. Love Me True has also produced the Cartier Champion Older Horse Duke of Marmalade.

Ruler of the World was trained by Aidan O'Brien at Ballydoyle.

== Racing career ==
=== 2013: Three-year-old season ===
==== Spring ====
Ruler of the World did not compete as a two-year-old and made his debut in a 10-furlong maiden race at the Curragh on 7 April. Ridden by his trainer's son Joseph O'Brien, he started at the 2/1 second favourite in a field of eleven three-year-olds. Ruler of the World tracked the leaders before moving up into second place in the straight. He took the lead fifty yards from the finish and won going away by three quarters of a length from Manalapan. However, the subsequent poor form of the runner-up did little to boost the winner's reputation.

On 9 May, he was sent to England where he competed in the Chester Vase, a trial race for the Derby. Ridden by Ryan Moore and racing in padded cheekpieces, he was made the 10/11 favourite against three British-trained opponents in what was described as a "run-of-the-mill" trial. Ruler of the World overtook the Mark Johnston-trained Mister Impatience a furlong from the finish and drew clear to win by six lengths. After the race, Moore said, "He's still a bit green running round here, but once I grabbed hold of him he lengthened really well." Bookmakers responded to the performance by offering odds of only 6/1 against Ruler of the World for the Derby.

==== Summer ====
On 1 June, Ruler of the World was one of twelve colts to contest the 234th running of the Derby at Epsom Downs Racecourse. Joseph O'Brien, who was given the pick of the stable's five runners, elected to ride Battle of Marengo, and the ride on Ruler of the World went to Ryan Moore. The colt started at odds of 7/1 in a field of twelve, with the 2000 Guineas winner Dawn Approach the 5/4 favourite. Other contenders included the Dante Stakes winner Libertarian from England, the Prix Greffulhe winner Ocovango from France and Chopin, the first German-trained horse to run in the Derby. Ruler of the World was restrained towards the back of the field in the early stages and turned into the straight in ninth place. He moved into contention in the straight and took the lead from Battle of Marengo approaching the final furlong. He went clear of the field and was driven out by Moore and won by one and a half lengths from Libertarian, Galileo Rock, and Battle of Marengo. Ruler of the World was Aidan O'Brien's fourth Derby winner following Galileo, High Chaparral, and Camelot, and gave Moore a second win in the Epsom Classic after his success on Workforce in 2010. Ruler of the World was the first Chester Vase winner since Shergar in 1981 to win the Derby, and the first winner of the Derby to be unraced as a two-year-old since Commander in Chief in 1993.

After the race, Moore said, "I wanted to be a bit closer, but I just didn't get away very well and it was a very messy race. I had no option but to go on when I did. I knew he'd stay the trip very well but I got there a bit soon and he was very green. He'll get further. He's got a really likeable attitude. I knew the others were coming because I'd gone too early, but he really toughed it out and showed a very good attitude." O'Brien praised his winner, saying, "Credit to him, as he is really still a baby. But he'd come on a lot for his race at Chester." Responding to suggestions that his horses had run as a team, the trainer stated, "All the riders knew their horses and rode their own races, and what happened is just the way it ended up." Following his victory at the 2013 Investec Derby, Ruler of the World was allotted a mark of 120 by the BHA Head of Handicapping, making him the lowest-rated winner of the Epsom Classic this century.

Four weeks after his win at Epsom, Ruler of the World contested the Irish Derby over one and a half miles at the Curragh. Ridden by Joseph O'Brien, he started the 4/5 favourite in a field which included Libertarian and Galileo Rock, his nearest pursuers at Epsom. O'Brien held the colt up at the back of the nine-runner field before moving to the outside in the straight. Ruler of the World made some progress but never got on terms with the leaders and sustained his first defeat, finishing fifth behind Trading Leather. In an interview, O'Brien said that the defeat may have been as a result of too many races in a short period of time.

After a break of more than two months, the horse returned in the Prix Niel, a trial for the Prix de l'Arc de Triomphe over 2400 metres at Longchamp Racecourse. Moore struggled to obtain a clear run in the straight and had to switch the colt left, then right, in the closing stages. He finished strongly but failed by a short head to catch the Japanese challenger Kizuna, with the favourite, Flintshire, in fourth place. In the Prix de l'Arc de Triomphe on 6 October, Ruler of the World started at odds of 12/1 in a field of seventeen runners. The colt was settled behind the leaders by Moore but dropped to the back of the field when the pace quickened. He made some progress in the straight and finished seventh behind Treve.

In his last race of the season, Ruler of the World was dropped back in trip in the 10-furlong Champion Stakes at Ascot on 19 October, two weeks after his run in the Arc. Starting at odds of 7/1 in a 10 horse field and again partnered by Ryan Moore, the Derby winner rallied to challenge the leaders, (Farhh and Cirrus des Aigles), only to just fail and finish third beaten 3/4 length in a three-way fight to the finish. Farhh won the race and remained undefeated for the season, whereas the French champion Cirrus des Aigles won the 2011 renewal of the group 1 and finished second to Frankel in the 2012 edition. It was announced after the race that Ruler Of The World would stay in training as a four-year-old in 2014 but would not race again that year.

=== 2014: Four year old season ===
==== Spring ====
On 29 March, Ruler Of The World started at odds 6/1 for the 2014 running of the Dubai World Cup on the synthetic track at Meydan. He was drawn wide in stall 12 and raced for the first time in the colours of Al Shaqab Racing, who bought a 50% share in the horse the week of the race. Under jockey Joseph O'Brien, the colt was well placed behind the leaders early before tiring late on to finish 13th of 16 runners, well behind Godolphin Racing's winner African Story.

==== Autumn ====
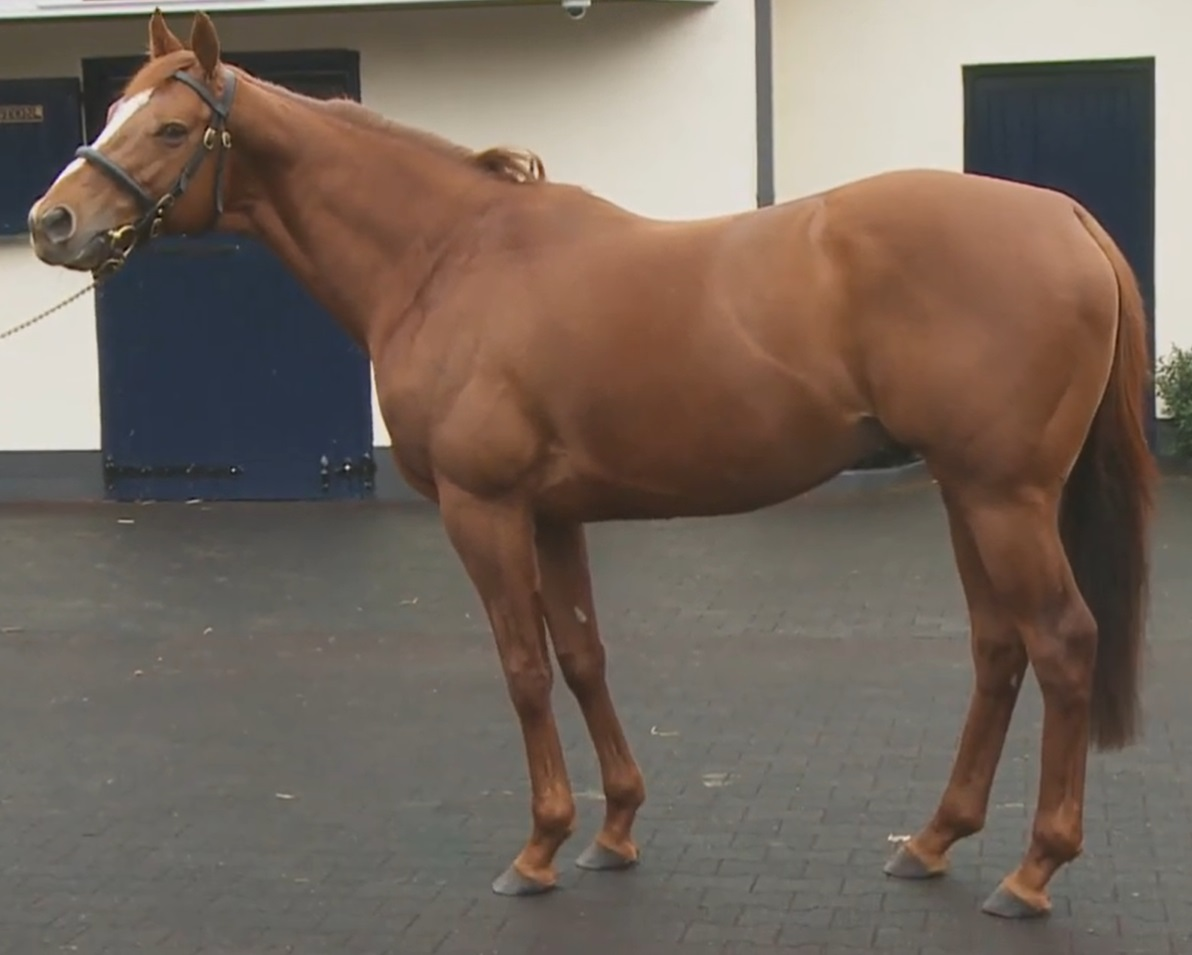
Ruler of the World at Coolmore Stud Ireland 2015

Plans to run the colt in the Coronation Cup at Epsom in June were abandoned after he sustained a muscle injury in training. Ruler of the World did not reappear until 14 September, when he contested the Prix Foy over 2400 metres at Longchamp, a trial race for the Prix de l'Arc de Triomphe. Ridden by Frankie Dettori, he started third favourite behind Flintshire, the winner of the 2013 Grand Prix de Paris and Spiritjim, the disqualified "winner" of the Prix Ganay. Ruler of the World led from the start, accelerated clear of his rivals in the straight, and won by one and a half lengths from Flintshire. On 5 October, he started at odd of 17/1 for the 93rd running of the Prix de l'Arc de Triomphe. Dettori sent the colt into the lead at the start before settling him behind the pacemaker Montviron. He stayed on at the same pace in the straight but was overtaken by several horses and finished ninth of the twenty runners behind Treve. In his second attempt to win the Champion Stakes two weeks later, he finished last of the nine runners behind Noble Mission.

=== Retirement ===
On 24 October 2014, it was announced Ruler of the World would be retired to stand at Coolmore stud alongside his father, Galileo, and fellow derby winners Pour Moi, Camelot, and Australia.

== Stud career ==
=== Notable progeny ===
c = colt, f = filly, g = gelding

Foaled	Name	Sex	Major wins
2016	Iridessa	f	Fillies' Mile, Pretty Polly Stakes, Matron Stakes, Breeders' Cup Filly & Mare Turf
2018	La Petite Coco	f	Pretty Polly Stakes
2021	The Best World	m	No major wins

== Pedigree ==
Pedigree of Ruler of the World (IRE), chestnut colt, 2010
Sire Galileo (IRE) 1998	Sadler's Wells (USA); 1981	Northern Dancer	Nearctic
Sire Galileo (IRE) 1998	Sadler's Wells (USA); 1981	Northern Dancer	Natalma
Sire Galileo (IRE) 1998	Sadler's Wells (USA); 1981	Fairy Bridge	Bold Reason
Sire Galileo (IRE) 1998	Sadler's Wells (USA); 1981	Fairy Bridge	Special
Sire Galileo (IRE) 1998	Urban Sea (USA) ch. 1989	Miswaki	Mr. Prospector
Sire Galileo (IRE) 1998	Urban Sea (USA) ch. 1989	Miswaki	Hopespringseternal
Sire Galileo (IRE) 1998	Urban Sea (USA) ch. 1989	Allegretta	Lombard
Sire Galileo (IRE) 1998	Urban Sea (USA) ch. 1989	Allegretta	Anatevka
Dam Love Me True (USA) 1998	Kingmambo (USA); 1990	Mr. Prospector	Raise a Native
Dam Love Me True (USA) 1998	Kingmambo (USA); 1990	Mr. Prospector	Gold Digger
Dam Love Me True (USA) 1998	Kingmambo (USA); 1990	Miesque	Nureyev
Dam Love Me True (USA) 1998	Kingmambo (USA); 1990	Miesque	Pasadoble
Dam Love Me True (USA) 1998	Lassie's Lady (USA); 1981	Alydar	Raise a Native
Dam Love Me True (USA) 1998	Lassie's Lady (USA); 1981	Alydar	Sweet Tooth
Dam Love Me True (USA) 1998	Lassie's Lady (USA); 1981	Lassie Dear	Buckpasser
Dam Love Me True (USA) 1998	Lassie's Lady (USA); 1981	Lassie Dear	Gay Missile (Family 3-l)

- Ruler of the World is inbred 3 × 4 to Mr. Prospector, meaning that this stallion appears in both the third and fourth generations of his pedigree. He is also inbred 4 × 4 to Raise a Native.
