= Miss France (horse) =

Irish-bred Thoroughbred racehorse

- Racing silks of Ballymore Thoroughbred Ltd
- Sire: Dansili
- Grandsire: Danehill
- Dam: Miss Tahiti
- Damsire: Tirol
- Sex: Mare
- Foaled: 23 March 2011
- Country: Ireland
- Colour: Bay
- Breeder: Dayton Investments
- Owner: Ballymore Thoroughbred
- Trainer: André Fabre
- Record: 9:3-3-0
- Earnings: £401,219

Major wins
- Oh So Sharp Stakes (2013); 1000 Guineas (2014)

Miss France (foaled 23 March 2011) is an Irish-bred, French-trained Thoroughbred racehorse. In May 2014 she won the 1000 Guineas.

== Background ==
Miss France is a bay filly with no white markings, bred in Ireland by Dayton Investments. She was sired by Dansili, whose other progeny have included Harbinger, The Fugue, Dank and Rail Link. Her dam, Miss Tahiti, was a top-class racemare who won the Group One Prix Marcel Boussac in 1995.

== Racing career ==
=== 2013: two-year-old season ===
Miss France began her racing career at Deauville Racecourse on 1 August when she finished ninth of the ten runners in a maiden race over 1200 metres. On 31 August she started 5.3/1 second favourite for a race over 1600 metres at Chantilly Racecourse. Ridden by Maxime Guyon, she accelerated clear of her opponents in the last 200 metres to win by one and a quarter lengths from Indonesienne, a filly who went on to win the Prix Marcel Boussac. Four weeks after her win at Chantilly, Miss France was sent to England to contest the Group Three Oh So Sharp Stakes over seven furlongs at Newmarket Racecourse. She was ridden by Mickael Barzalona and started 7/2 second favourite in a nine-runner field. After being restrained at the back of the field he moved forward to take the lead inside the final furlong and prevailed by a head from Lightning Thunder, despite appearing to idle in the closing stages.

=== 2014: three-year-old season ===
On her first appearance as a three-year-old, Miss France started 8/5 favourite for the Group Three Prix Imprudence over 1400 metres at Maisons-Laffitte Racecourse on 3 April. She never looked likely to win and finished sixth of the ten runners behind the François Doumen-trained outsider Xcellence. On 4 May Miss France started the 7/1 third favourite for the 1000 Guineas over the Rowley Mile at Newmarket. Ridden by Guyon, she took the lead approaching the final furlong and held off a late challenge from Lighting Thunder to win by a neck.

On 15 June, the filly was moved up in distance for the Prix de Diane over 2100 metres at Chantilly. Guyon struggled to obtain a clear run in the straight before finishing strongly to dead-heat for fifth place, one and three quarter lengths behind the winner Avenir Certain. In August, Miss France finished second behind her stable companion Esoterique in the Group One Prix Rothschild at Deauville, with the British-trained favourite Integral in third place. In October, Miss France returned to Newmarket for the Group One Sun Chariot Stakes in which she was one of four 7/2 co-favourites alongside Fintry, Esoterique and Integral. She raced in third place for most of the way before finishing second, a length behind Integral.

=== 2015: four-year-old season ===
After an absence of more than ten months, Miss France returned to the track in the Listed Prix de la Cochere at Longchamp on 6 September and finished second of the nine runners, a short neck behind the three-year-old winner Sonnerie.

== Pedigree ==
Pedigree of Miss France (IRE), bay filly, 2011
Sire Dansili (GB) 1996	Danehill (IUSA); 1986	Danzig	Northern Dancer
Sire Dansili (GB) 1996	Danehill (IUSA); 1986	Danzig	Pas de Nom
Sire Dansili (GB) 1996	Danehill (IUSA); 1986	Razyana	His Majesty
Sire Dansili (GB) 1996	Danehill (IUSA); 1986	Razyana	Spring Adieu
Sire Dansili (GB) 1996	Hasili (IRE); 1991	Kahyasi	Ile de Bourbon
Sire Dansili (GB) 1996	Hasili (IRE); 1991	Kahyasi	Kadissya
Sire Dansili (GB) 1996	Hasili (IRE); 1991	Kerali	High Line
Sire Dansili (GB) 1996	Hasili (IRE); 1991	Kerali	Sookera
Dam Miss Tahiti (IRE) 1993	Tirol (IRE); 1987	Thatching	Thatch
Dam Miss Tahiti (IRE) 1993	Tirol (IRE); 1987	Thatching	Abella
Dam Miss Tahiti (IRE) 1993	Tirol (IRE); 1987	Alpine Niece	Great Nephew
Dam Miss Tahiti (IRE) 1993	Tirol (IRE); 1987	Alpine Niece	Fragrant Dawn
Dam Miss Tahiti (IRE) 1993	Mini Luthe (FR); 1982	Luthier	Klairon
Dam Miss Tahiti (IRE) 1993	Mini Luthe (FR); 1982	Luthier	Flute Enchantee
Dam Miss Tahiti (IRE) 1993	Mini Luthe (FR); 1982	Minifer	Jim French
Dam Miss Tahiti (IRE) 1993	Mini Luthe (FR); 1982	Minifer	Valmarena (Family 10-e)
