= 2015 Epsom Derby =

- Epsom Derby
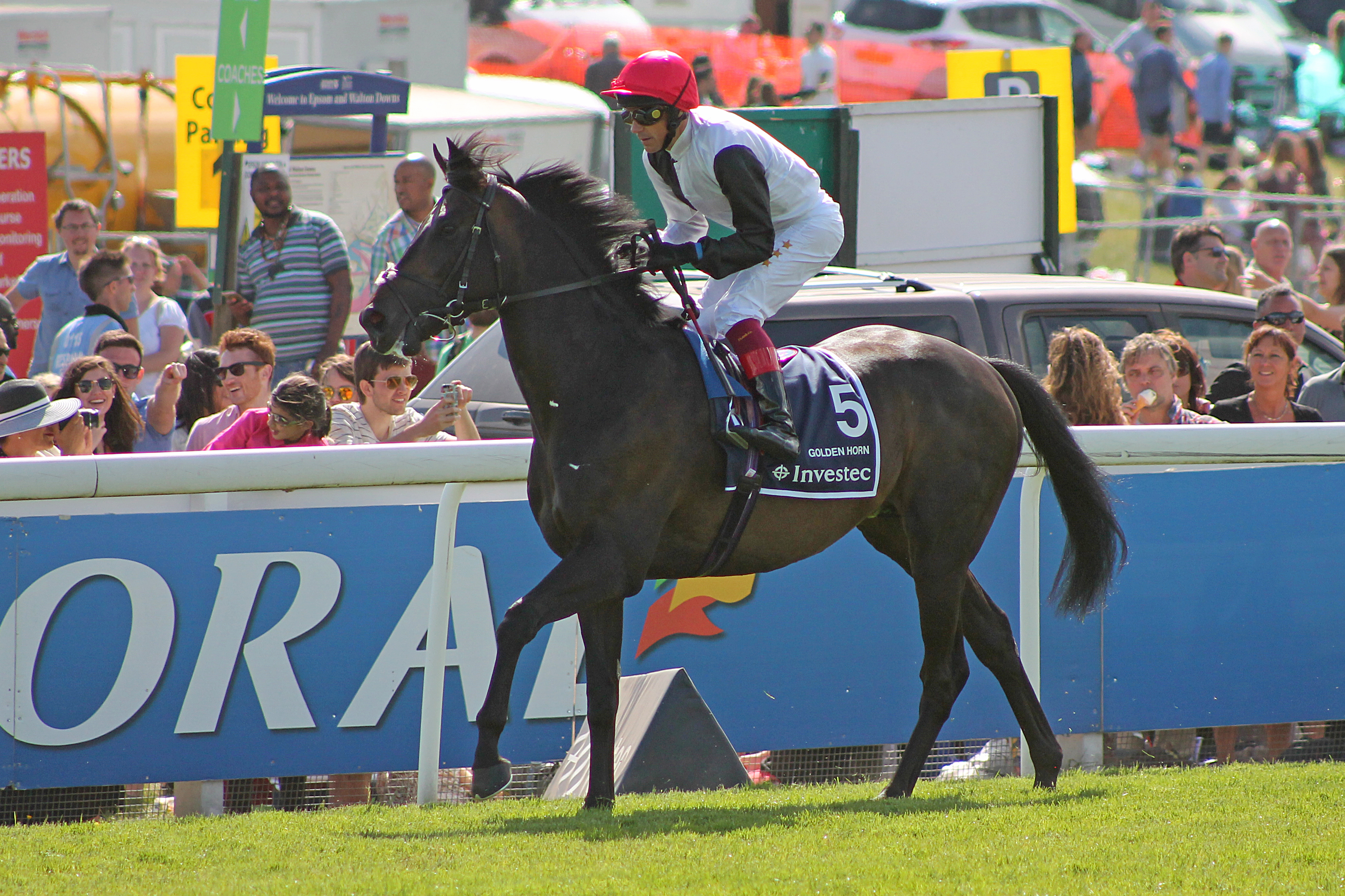
- Golden Horn at the 2015 Epsom Derby
- Location: Epsom Downs Racecourse
- Date: 6 June 2015
- Winning horse: Golden Horn
- Starting price: 13–8 Fav
- Jockey: Frankie Dettori
- Trainer: John Gosden
- Owner: Anthony Oppenheimer
- Conditions: Good to firm

Epsom Derby 2015
1-2-3
Golden Horn	Jack Hobbs	Storm The Stars

Also Ran
4-5-6
Giovanni Canaletto	Epicuris	Kilimanjaro
7-8-9
Hans Holbein	Carbon Dating	Rogue Runner
10-11-12
Moheet	Elm Park	Success Days

The 2015 Epsom Derby (known as the Investec Derby for sponsorship reasons) was the 236th annual running of the Derby horse race and took place at Epsom Downs Racecourse on 6 June 2015. The race was won by the favourite, Golden Horn, a British-bred bay colt, owned by Anthony Oppenheimer, trained in Newmarket, Suffolk by John Gosden and ridden by Frankie Dettori. The colt's win was the first for his owner, the second for Dettori (after Authorized in 2007) and the second for Gosden (after Benny the Dip in 1997).

== Race synopsis ==
=== Entries and race build-up ===
The initial entry for the 2015 Epsom Derby, announced in December 2013, consisted of 409 yearlings. The number of entries was three more than for the 2014 race and included 71 from Godolphin Racing and 54 from the partners of the Coolmore Stud. Sheikh Fahad Al Thani's Qatar Racing organization entered 15 yearlings while Sheikh Joaan bin Hamad bin Khalifa Al Thani was responsible for 12 entries. Amongst the Coolmore entries was a colt who had been purchased for a record public auction price of 3.6 million guineas in October 2013, and other owners with significant numbers of entries included Aga Khan IV with 51 yearlings and Sheikh Hamdan Al Maktoum's 47 entries. The number of potential runners was reduced to 102 at the first scratching date in March 2015, with John F Kennedy heading the betting market at odds of 6 to 1. The Coolmore stable was left with 21 possible runners, including John F Kennedy and the record auction colt, now named Sir Isaac Newton. A further 12 horses were added at the second entry stage in April 2015, including Gleneagles and Elm Park.

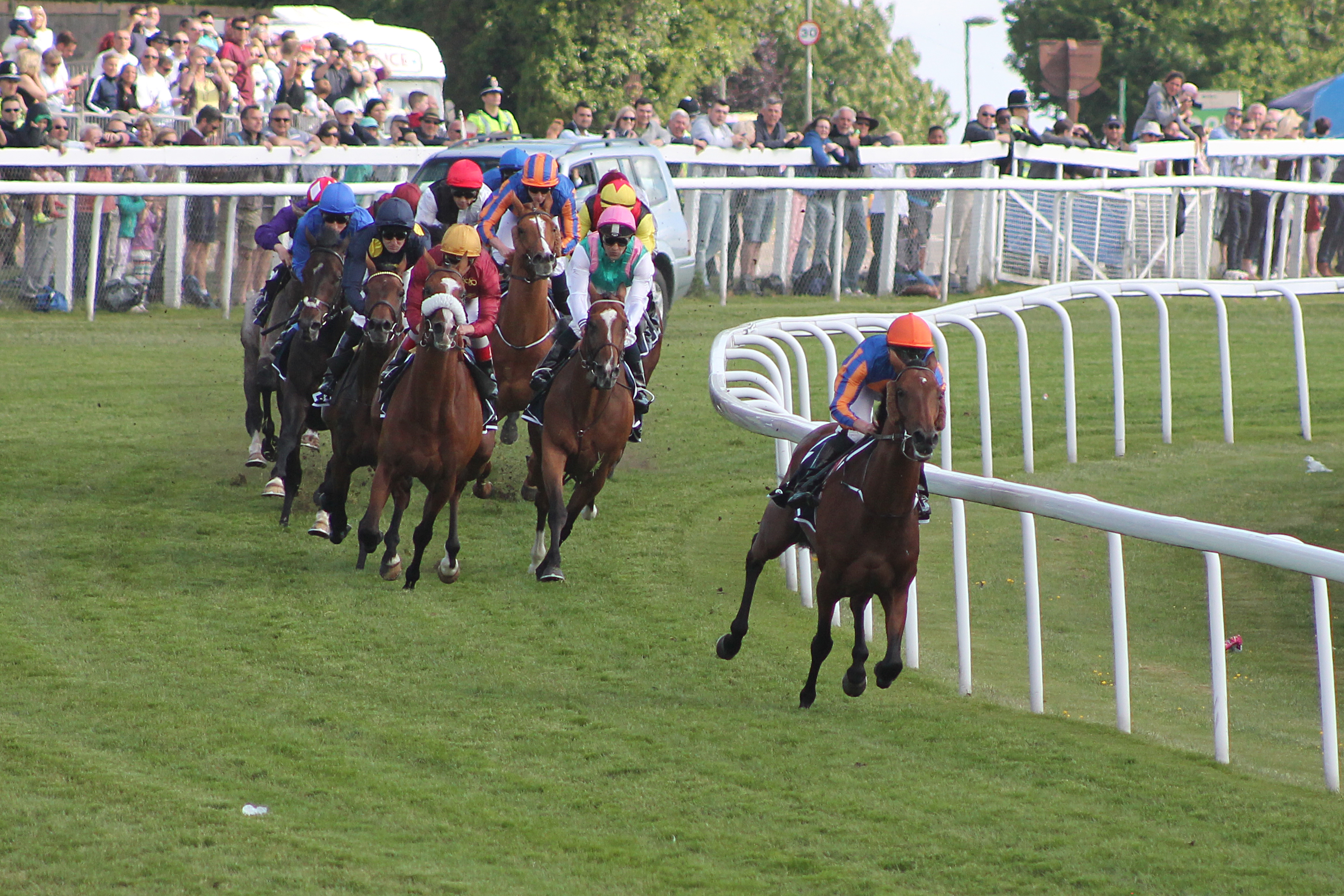
The field rounds Tattenham Corner with Hans Holbein leading.

The field began to take its final shape on 22 May when sixteen horses were left entered at the final forfeit stage. Amongst those remaining in the race were Gleneagles, who had won the 2000 Guineas since being entered; Hans Holbein, the winner of the Chester Vase and Jack Hobbs, runner-up in the Dante Stakes. The betting market was headed by Golden Horn, winner of the Feilden Stakes and the Dante Stakes, but who was not yet entered in the Derby. Golden Horn's owner, Anthony Oppenheimer, had indicated that he would enter the horse at the supplementary entry stage.

Final confirmations for the race took place on Monday 1 June leaving a potential field of fifteen runners. Gleneagles, Great Glen and Prince Gagarin were withdrawn by Aidan O'Brien and Golden Horn was supplemented as expected at a cost of £75,000. Success Days, winner of the Ballysax Stakes and Derrinstown Stud Derby Trial, was also supplemented for the race. The filly Found and Sumbal had been considered by their connections for supplementary entries but were not entered. Golden Horn was the favourite in the betting market at this point at odds of 7–4, followed by Zawraq at 5–1, Jack Hobbs at 7–1 and Elm Park at 9–1. The other eleven runners were all listed at 10–1 or greater. On the Tuesday before the race Zawraq returned from a gallop with a minor leg injury and his participation in the Derby was put in doubt. Zawraq's odds moved out to 7–1 while Giovanni Canaletto's price moved in to 8–1 after Ryan Moore was announced the horse's jockey for the race. On Thursday Zawraq was found to be lame again and was withdraw at the final declaration stage that morning along with Best Of Times and Rocky Rider, leaving a final declared field of twelve runners for the 2015 race.

On the day of the race, Saturday 6 June, Epsom's clerk of the course, Andrew Cooper, moved the Going description to "good, good to firm in places". The going for Friday's racing at Epsom had been "good" but dry weather that afternoon and overnight had made parts of the course good to firm. Jack Hobbs' participation in the race awaited a decision from trainer John Gosden, dependent on his view of whether the going would suit Jack Hobbs. After the first race of the afternoon the going description was changed to "good to firm", despite which Jack Hobbs was allowed to take his chance in the race.

In February 2015 Epsom's owners, Jockey Club Racecourses, announced that the race's start time would be 4.30pm, 30 minutes later than the 2014 running.

=== Race ===
The race began with Elm Park disputing the lead with Hans Holbein over the first half mile with Storm The Stars and Epicuris leading the chasing group, and most of the leading contenders being settled in behind. Andrea Atzeni eventually managed to restrain Elm Park, allowing Hans Holbein to establish a clear lead. At the turn into the straight Hans Holbein led by several lengths from Elm Park, followed by Epicuris, Storm The Stars, Jack Hobbs and Giovanni Canaletto. The leaders bunched approaching the final quarter mile with Hans Holbein challenged by Epicuris as Storm The Stars and Jack Hobbs challenged in the centre of the track and Golden Horn made rapid progress from the rear on the outside. Jack Hobbs took the lead but was quickly overtaken by his stablemate Golden Horn approaching the final furlong. In the closing stages Golden Horn drew away to win by three and a half lengths from Jack Hobbs, who was in turn four and a half lengths clear of Storm The Stars in third. Giovanni Canaletto took fourth ahead of Epicuris, Kilimanjaro and Hans Holbein. The winning time of 2:32.32 was the third fastest in the history of the race. The last place finisher Success Days sustained a hairline fracture in his left foot while running in the Derby and was treated on the course.

== Race card ==
No	Horse	Weight (st–lb)	Jockey	Trainer	Owner
1	Carbon Dating (IRE)	9–0	Ronan Whelan	John Patrick Shanahan (IRE)	Thistle Bloodstock Ltd
2	Elm Park	9–0	Andrea Atzeni	Andrew Balding	Qatar Racing Ltd
3	Epicuris	9–0	Thierry Thulliez	Criquette Head-Maarek (FRA)	Khalid Abdullah
4	Giovanni Canaletto (IRE)	9–0	Ryan Moore	Aidan O'Brien (IRE)	Tabor / Smith / Magnier
5	Golden Horn	9–0	Frankie Dettori	John Gosden	Anthony Oppenheimer
6	Hans Holbein	9–0	Seamie Heffernan	Aidan O'Brien (IRE)	Tabor / Smith / Magnier / Ah Khin
7	Jack Hobbs	9–0	William Buick	John Gosden	Godolphin & partners
8	Kilimanjaro (IRE)	9–0	Joseph O'Brien	Aidan O'Brien (IRE)	Tabor / Smith / Magnier
9	Moheet (IRE)	9–0	Pat Dobbs	Richard Hannon Jr.	Al Shaqab Racing
10	Rogue Runner (GER)	9–0	Oisin Murphy	Andreas Wohler (GER)	Qatar Racing Ltd
11	Storm The Stars (USA)	9–0	Pat Cosgrave	William Haggas	Sheikh Juma Dalmook al Maktoum
12	Success Days (IRE)	9–0	Shane Foley	Ken Condon (IRE)	Robert Ng

Trainers are based in Great Britain unless indicated.

== Full result ==
	Dist *	Horse	Jockey	Trainer	SP
1		Golden Horn	Frankie Dettori	John Gosden	13/8
2	3½	Jack Hobbs	William Buick	John Gosden	4/1
3	4½	Storm The Stars	Pat Cosgrave	William Haggas	16/1
4	2	Giovanni Canaletto	Ryan Moore	Aidan O'Brien (IRE)	6/1
5	1¾	Epicuris	Thierry Thulliez	Criquette Head-Maarek (FRA)	20/1
6	1¼	Kilimanjaro	Joseph O'Brien	Aidan O'Brien (IRE)	12/1
7	1½	Hans Holbein	Seamie Heffernan	Aidan O'Brien (IRE)	14/1
8	nse	Carbon Dating	Ronan Whelan	John Patrick Shanahan (IRE)	150/1
9	5	Rogue Runner	Oisin Murphy	Andreas Wohler (GER)	50/1
10	½	Moheet	Pat Dobbs	Richard Hannon Jr.	25/1
11	shd	Elm Park	Andrea Atzeni	Andrew Balding	9/1
12	8	Success Days	Shane Foley	Ken Condon (IRE)	12/1

* The distances between the horses are shown in lengths or shorter; hd = head.
† Trainers are based in Great Britain unless indicated.

== Winner details ==
Further details of the winner:

- Foaled: 27 March 2012
- Sire: Cape Cross
- Owner: Anthony Oppenheimer
- Breeder: Hascombe and Valiant Studs

== Form analysis ==
=== Two-year-old races ===
Notable runs by the future Derby participants as two-year-olds in 2014

- Elm Park – 1st in Stonehenge Stakes, 1st in Royal Lodge Stakes, 1st in Racing Post Trophy
- Epicuris – 1st in Prix de Condé, 1st in Critérium de Saint-Cloud
- Success Days – 5th in Eyrefield Stakes

=== Road to Epsom ===
Early-season appearances in 2015 and trial races prior to running in the Derby:

- Carbon Dating – 5th in Investec Derby Trial, 3rd in Derrinstown Stud Derby Trial
- Elm Park – 3rd in Dante Stakes
- Epicuris – 2nd in Prix La Force
- Giovanni Canaletto – 2nd in Gallinule Stakes
- Golden Horn – 1st in Feilden Stakes, 1st in Dante Stakes
- Hans Holbein – 1st in Chester Vase
- Jack Hobbs – 2nd in Dante Stakes
- Kilimanjaro – 1st in Lingfield Derby Trial
- Moheet – 3rd in Craven Stakes, 8th in 2000 Guineas
- Rogue Runner – 3rd in Fruhjahrs-Preis des Bankhauses Metzler Stadtrat Albert von Metzler-Rennen
- Storm The Stars – 2nd in Chester Vase, 1st in Cocked Hat Stakes
- Success Days – 1st in Ballysax Stakes, 1st in Derrinstown Stud Derby Trial

=== Subsequent Group 1 wins ===
Group 1 / Grade I victories after running in the Derby:

- Golden Horn - Eclipse Stakes (2015), Irish Champion Stakes (2015), Prix de l'Arc de Triomphe (2015)
- Jack Hobbs – Irish Derby (2015), Sheema Classic (2017)

== Subsequent breeding careers ==
Leading progeny of participants in the 2015 Epsom Derby.

Golden Horn (1st) - West End Girl (1st Sweet Solera Stakes 2019)
Jack Hobbs (2nd) - Offspring yet to race
Storm The Stars (3rd) - Offspring yet to race
Elm Park (11th) - Offspring yet to race
Success Days (12th) - Standing in Ireland
