= Jack Hobbs (horse) =

British-bred Thoroughbred racehorse

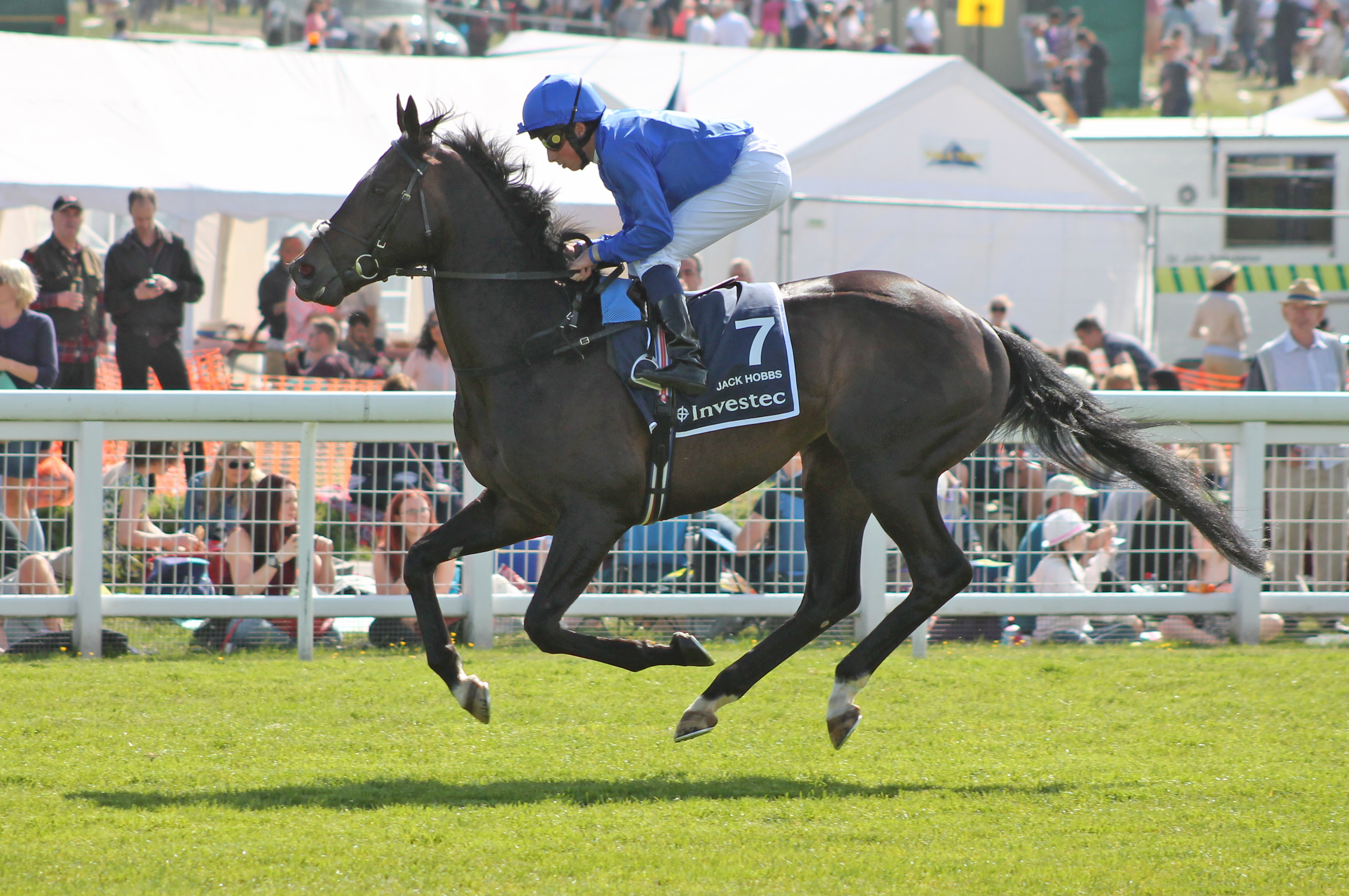
- Jack Hobbs at the 2015 Epsom Derby
- Sire: Halling
- Grandsire: Diesis
- Dam: Swain's Gold
- Damsire: Swain
- Sex: Stallion
- Foaled: 2 March 2012
- Country: United Kingdom
- Colour: Brown
- Breeder: Minster Stud
- Owner: Bailey, Hall & Hood; Godolphin & Partners
- Trainer: John Gosden
- Record: 10: 5-2-2
- Earnings: £4,165,045

Major wins
- Irish Derby (2015); September Stakes (2015); Sheema Classic (2017)
- Last updated on 25 March 2017

Jack Hobbs (foaled 2 March 2012) is a British Thoroughbred racehorse. After winning his only race as a juvenile, he established himself as a potentially top-class colt with a twelve length win in a race at Sandown on his three-year-old debut. He finished second to his stable companion Golden Horn in both the Dante Stakes and The Derby before winning the Irish Derby by five lengths. He ran twice more in 2015, winning the September Stakes before being beaten when favourite for the Champion Stakes. His 2016 season was badly disrupted by injury and he ran only twice, failing to complete his first start and being beaten on his eventual reappearance. However, he rebounded in 2017 by winning the Sheema Classic at Meydan Racecourse on Dubai World Cup Night.

== Background ==
Jack Hobbs is a brown colt with a small white star and three white socks bred in the United Kingdom by Willie Carson's Gloucestershire-based Minster Stud. He was sired by Halling, a top-class performer who won two editions of both the Eclipse Stakes and the International Stakes. Before Jack Hobbs, Halling's best offspring included Opinion Poll (Dubai Gold Cup), Cavalryman (Grand Prix de Paris) and Norse Dancer (Earl of Sefton Stakes). Jack Hobbs's dam Swain's Gold was a Kentucky-bred mare who won three races at Turf Paradise in 2004. Swain's Gold was daughter of the Orchid Handicap winner Golden Pond who was in turn a granddaughter of Connaught's half-sister Daffodil Day. Before foaling Jack Hobbs, Swain's Gold had produced the successful handicapper Niceofyoutotellme and a mare named Mrs Greeley who won three minor races.

As a yearling in October 2013, the colt was consigned to the Tattersalls sale where he was bought for 60,000 guineas by Blandford Bloodstock. He then entered the ownership of Bailey, Hall & Rachel Hood and was sent into training with Hood's husband, John Gosden, at Newmarket, Suffolk.

The colt is named after the Surrey and England cricketer Jack Hobbs.

== Racing career ==
=== 2014: two-year-old season ===
Jack Hobbs made his racecourse debut in an eight and a half furlong maiden race on the synthetic Tapeta surface at Wolverhampton Racecourse on 27 December. Ridden by Robert Havlin, he started favourite in a twelve-runner field and won by three lengths from Dutch Uncle.

=== 2015: three-year-old season ===
On his first appearance as a three-year-old, Jack Hobbs carried a weight of 125 pounds in a ten furlong handicap race at Sandown Park Racecourse on 24 April. Ridden by Frankie Dettori, he started the 10/11 favourite against eight opponents. After pulling hard in the early stages he settled into second place behind the leader Rotherwick before taking the lead approaching the final furlong. He quickly accelerated clear of the field and won by twelve lengths despite being eased down by Dettori in the closing stages. Although his pre-race handicap rating of 85 suggested that he had a great deal of improvement to make to reach the highest standard he was immediately regarded as a serious contender for The Derby. Gosden described the winner as a "big, rangy boy" and added "He's a lovely, progressive horse and we’ll see where he goes from here". Three weeks later the colt was moved up in class for the Dante Stakes (a major trial race for the Epsom Derby) over ten and a half furlongs at York Racecourse. He was made the 2/1 favourite ahead of Elm Park, John F Kennedy and Golden Horn (also trained by Gosden). After tracking leaders he moved up to challenge Elm Park for the lead in the last quarter mile. He got the better of Elm Park but proved no match for his stablemate Golden Horn, who accelerated past him in the closing stages to win by two and three quarter lengths. Dettori reportedly felt that Jack Hobbs was still a "big baby", and much less mature than his stablemate. After the race a half-share in the colt was bought by Sheikh Mohammed's Godolphin organisation.

On 6 June, Jack Hobbs was one of twelve colts to contest the 236th running of the Derby Stakes over one and a half miles at Epsom Downs Racecourse. Gosden had expressed some doubts about risking the colt on the prevailing firm ground but decided to run after Jack Hobbs performed well in a training gallop at the track. Ridden by Godolphin's retained jockey William Buick, he started the 4/1 second favourite behind Golden Horn. He turned into the straight in fifth place and moved up to take the lead approaching the final furlong before being overtaken by Golden Horn. He stayed on well in the closing stages to finish second, three and a half lengths behind his stablemate and four and a half lengths clear of Storm The Stars, who took third place ahead of the Aidan O'Brien-trained Giovanni Canaletto.

Three weeks after his defeat at Epsom, Jack Hobbs was sent to Ireland for the Irish Derby at the Curragh on 27 June. It was the 150th running of the event and the Irish Turf Club invited many previous winning owners, trainers and jockeys to the race which was regarded as the most competitive renewal for several years. Giovanni Canaletto and Storm The Stars were again in opposition, as well as The Oaks winner Qualify, the Prix du Jockey Club runner-up Highland Reel and the previously undefeated Radanpour. Starting the 10/11 favourite he was settled in third place by Buick before moving into second behind Storm The Stars in the straight. He took the lead a furlong and a half from the finish and drew away to win by five lengths from Storm The Stars, with a further five and a half lengths back to Giovanni Canaletto in third. He was the first British-trained colt to win the race since Commander in Chief 1993. After the race Buick commented "I had a lot of belief in him before Epsom and he was even better today. He's a horse that's improving all the time. It's fantastic to win an Irish Derby, but it's just great to ride horses like him. He's been handled brilliantly by John. He's obviously a late maturing horse, but he's really coming to himself now and he's a serious horse." Announcing his plans for the winner, Gosden said "We'll put him away for the Prix Niel at Longchamp and go for the Arc after. He'll be better at four because he's quite light framed and needs to fill out."

Despite Gosden's prediction, Jack Hobbs returned on 5 September for the September Stakes on the synthetic Polytrack surface at Kempton Park Racecourse. Matched against older horses for the first time he started the 1/5 favourite ahead of six opponents including Zetland Gold Cup winner Fire Fighting and the John Smith's Cup winner Arab Dawn. Buick settled the colt in second place before sending the favourite into the lead approaching the final quarter mile. Jack Hobbs quickly went clear of the field and won very easily by three and a quarter lengths from the 66/1 outsider Sweeping Up. Gosden commented "He has won well and I am happy to get a nice prep race into him at home rather than travelling for it and then having to come back to travel again".

Jack Hobbs bypassed the Prix de l'Arc de Triomphe and reappeared in the Champion Stakes over ten furlongs at Ascot two weeks later and was made favourite despite an unfavourable outside draw. William Buick tracked the pacemaker Maverick Wave before taking the lead in the straight but was never able to establish a decisive advantage. He was overtaken in the final furlong and finished third behind Fascinating Rock and Found. Gosden commented "He ran a great race today and this is no surprise to me... He is a big, overgrown kid and I couldn't be more thrilled with him today. This horse will be bigger and stronger next year and I am not in the slightest bit disappointed in him."

=== 2016: four-year-old season ===
Jack Hobbs began his third season in the Jockey Club Stakes at Newmarket on 30 April and started odds-on favourite against five opponents headed by the St Leger winner Simple Verse. He started slowly, appeared to be struggling half a mile from the finish and quickly dropped out of contention. He was pulled up and dismounted by Buick over a furlong out. It was subsequently announced that the colt had sustained a stress fracture of the pelvis and would be off the racecourse until autumn.

The colt returned in the Champion Stakes at Ascot on 14 October in which he started at odds of 7/1 in a ten-runner field. After racing towards the rear of the field in the early stages he stayed on strongly in the straight to finish third behind Almanzor and Found.

=== 2017: five-year-old season ===
On his first appearance as a five-year-old Jack Hobbs was sent to the United Arab Emirates to contest the Dubai Sheema Classic over 2400 metres at Meydan Racecourse on 25 March, and was equipped with blinkers for the first time. His six opponents included Highland Reel, Postponed and Seventh Heaven. Ridden by Buick he raced in third place behind Highland Reel before taking the lead in the straight and won by two and a quarter lengths from Seventh Heaven with Postponed in third. Commenting on the decision to run the hore in headgear for the first time Gosden said "He's dreamy. He won’t focus. He's like a kid in a school room looking out the window. I brought him out here in the lights, I put them on and did a work, and he just worked sensationally away from his lead horse. I thought, ‘I’m going to leave these on.’"

== Pedigree ==
Pedigree of Jack Hobbs (GB), brown colt 2012
Sire Halling (USA) 1991	Diesis (GB); 1980	Sharpen Up	Atan
Sire Halling (USA) 1991	Diesis (GB); 1980	Sharpen Up	Rocchetta
Sire Halling (USA) 1991	Diesis (GB); 1980	Doubly Sure	Reliance
Sire Halling (USA) 1991	Diesis (GB); 1980	Doubly Sure	Soft Angels
Sire Halling (USA) 1991	Dance Machine (GB); 1982	Green Dancer	Nijinsky
Sire Halling (USA) 1991	Dance Machine (GB); 1982	Green Dancer	Green Valley
Sire Halling (USA) 1991	Dance Machine (GB); 1982	Never A Lady	Pontifex
Sire Halling (USA) 1991	Dance Machine (GB); 1982	Never A Lady	Camogie
Dam Swain's Gold (USA) 2001	Swain (IRE); 1992	Nashwan	Blushing Groom
Dam Swain's Gold (USA) 2001	Swain (IRE); 1992	Nashwan	Height of Fashion
Dam Swain's Gold (USA) 2001	Swain (IRE); 1992	Love Smitten	Key to the Mint
Dam Swain's Gold (USA) 2001	Swain (IRE); 1992	Love Smitten	Square Angel
Dam Swain's Gold (USA) 2001	Golden Pond (IRE); 1993	Don't Forget Me	Ahonoora
Dam Swain's Gold (USA) 2001	Golden Pond (IRE); 1993	Don't Forget Me	African Doll
Dam Swain's Gold (USA) 2001	Golden Pond (IRE); 1993	Golden Bloom	Main Reef
Dam Swain's Gold (USA) 2001	Golden Pond (IRE); 1993	Golden Bloom	Daffodil Day (Family: 4-h)
