= Trial races for the Epsom Derby =

Trial races for the Epsom Derby are horse races during April and May which are contested by three-year-olds likely to run in the Derby in early June.

Most Derby runners appear in at least one race in the weeks before the event, although some, such as the winners Lammtarra and Shaamit, have arrived at Epsom with no previous run as a three-year-old.

The leading trial of recent years has been the Dante Stakes, which has been contested by eight subsequent winners of the Derby in the last 33 years. The following table shows any race classed at Listed level or above which served as a trial for a Derby winner during the period 1992 to 2026.

Race	Derby winners from race 1992–2026 (won unless stated)
Prix La Force	Pour Moi (3rd)
Feilden Stakes	Erhaab (2nd), Golden Horn
Craven Stakes	Dr Devious (2nd), Masar
Ballysax Stakes	Sinndar (2nd), Galileo, High Chaparral, Harzand, Christmas Day
Sandown Classic Trial	Benny the Dip (2nd), Adayar (2nd)
2,000 Guineas	Sir Percy (2nd), New Approach (2nd), Sea the Stars, Camelot, Australia (3rd), Masar (3rd), Auguste Rodin (12th), City of Troy (9th)
Kentucky Derby	Dr Devious (7th)
Dee Stakes	Oath, Kris Kin
Lingfield Derby Trial	High-Rise, Anthony Van Dyck, Adayar (2nd)
Prix Greffulhe	Pour Moi
Chester Vase	Ruler of the World, Wings of Eagles (2nd), Lambourn
Derrinstown Stud Derby Trial	Sinndar, Galileo, High Chaparral
Dante Stakes	Erhaab, Benny the Dip, North Light, Motivator, Authorized, Workforce (2nd), Golden Horn, Desert Crown, Christmas Day (3rd)
Glasgow Stakes(No longer a trial)	Commander in Chief
Irish 2,000 Guineas	New Approach (2nd)
Unraced as 3-y-o	Lammtarra, Shaamit
Winners on maiden	Serpentine

== See also ==
- Trial races for the Epsom Oaks
