= Elm Park (horse) =

British-bred Thoroughbred racehorse

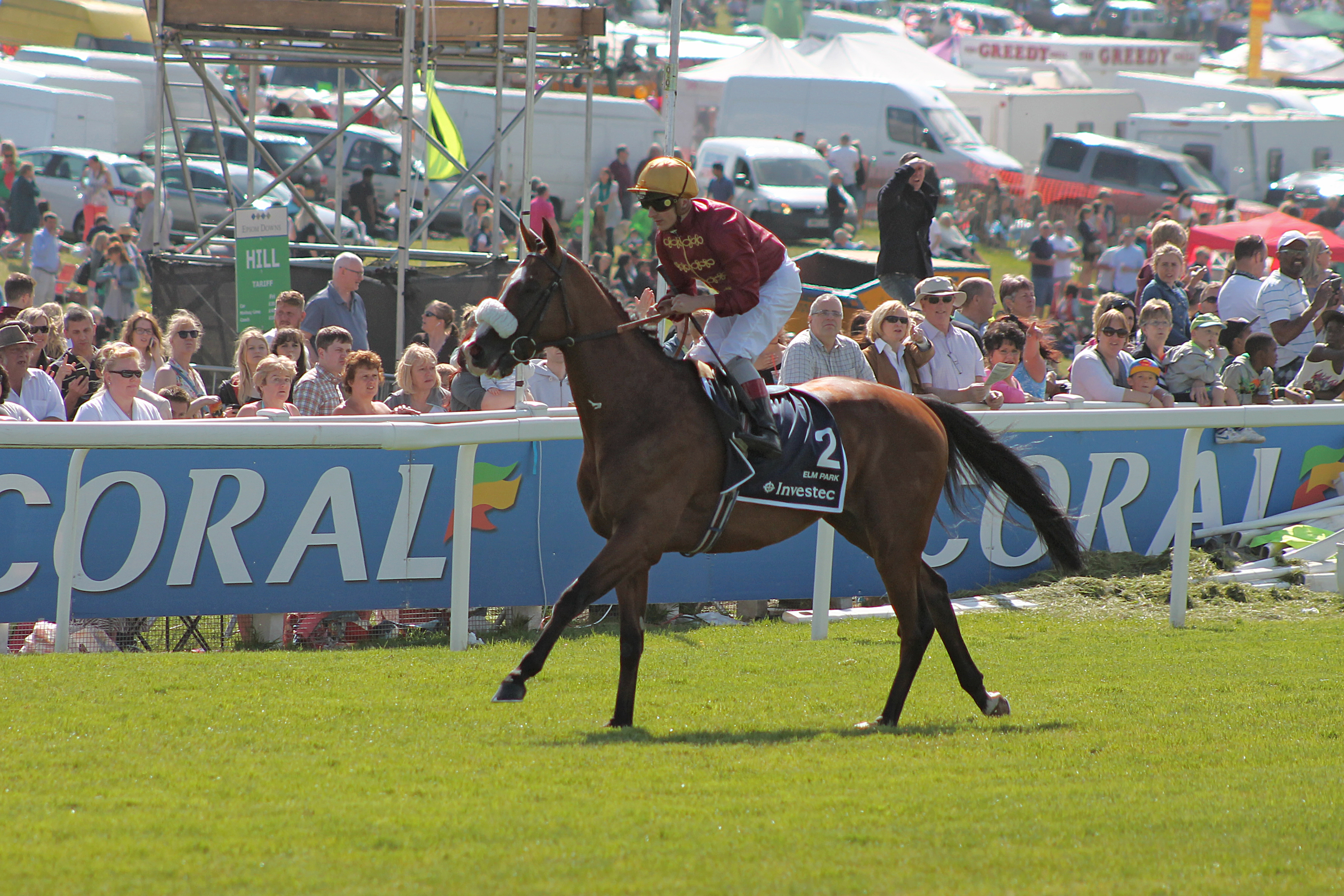
- Elm Park at the 2015 Epsom Derby
- Sire: Phoenix Reach
- Grandsire: Alhaarth
- Dam: Lady Brora
- Damsire: Dashing Blade
- Sex: Stallion
- Foaled: 23 January 2012
- Country: United Kingdom
- Color: Bay
- Breeder: Kingsclere Stud
- Owner: Kingsclere Racing Club; Qatar Racing
- Trainer: Andrew Balding
- Record: 9: 5-0-2
- Earnings: £279,829

Major wins
- Stonehenge Stakes (2014); Royal Lodge Stakes (2014); Racing Post Trophy (2014); Fortune Stakes (2015)

Elm Park (foaled 23 January 2012) is a British Thoroughbred racehorse. As a two-year-old he became regarded as a leading contender for the 2015 British Classic Races after wins in the Royal Lodge Stakes and the Racing Post Trophy. In 2015 he finished third to Golden Horn and Jack Hobbs in the Dante Stakes but finished unplaced in The Derby. He later won the listed Fortune Stakes.

== Background ==
Elm Park is a bay horse with a white blaze bred in England by the Berkshire-based Kingsclere Stud. He is the first major winner sired by Phoenix Reach, an Irish-bred, British-trained horse whose wins included the Canadian International Stakes, Hong Kong Vase and Dubai Sheema Classic. Elm Park's dam, Lady Brora, was a moderate performer who won one minor race at Great Leighs Racecourse from twelve starts in 2008 and 2009. She was a distant descendant of Own Sister, a full-sister of the leading sire Son-in-Law.

Elm Park was sent into training with Andrew Balding at Kingsclere. He began his racing career in the ownership of the Kingsclere Racing Club but was later bought by Qatar Racing.

== Racing career ==
=== 2014: two-year-old season ===
Elm Park made his debut in a seven furlong maiden race at Sandown Park Racecourse on 30 July. Ridden by David Probert he showed his inexperience ("ran green") and finished third of the eight runners behind the 8/15 favourite Latharnach. In a similar event at Newbury Racecourse on 15 August he started favourite against twelve opponents and won by three lengths having taken the lead two furlongs from the finish. Two weeks later the colt was stepped up in class and distance and started favourite for the Listed Stonehenge Stakes over one mile at Salisbury Racecourse. He led from the start and drew away in the final furlong to win by three lengths.

Andrea Atzeni took over from Probert when Elm Park contested the Group Two Royal Lodge Stakes over one mile at Newmarket Racecourse on 27 September. He started the 11/4 second favourite behind the Barry Hills-trained Nafaqa, who had won the Listed Flying Scotsman Stakes at Doncaster earlier in the month. Elm Park appeared to stumble exiting the starting stalls and again a furlong out but recovered to take the lead 100 yards from the finish and won by a length from Nafaqa, with a gap of four lengths back to Salateen in third. On his final appearance of the season Elm Park was stepped up to Group One class for the Racing Post Trophy at Doncaster on 25 October and was made 13/8 favourite against seven opponents headed by the Aidan O'Brien-trained Jacobean. The colt was sent into the lead by Atzeni after a quarter of a mile and set the pace before pulling away in the final furlong to win by two and three quarter lengths from the O'Brien second-string Aloft.

=== 2015: three-year-old season ===
Elm Park was initially aimed at the 2000 Guineas but was withdrawn from the race as Balding felt that he would have been unsuited by the prevailing firm ground. On his first appearance as a three-year-old, Elm Park contested the Group Two Dante Stakes at York Racecourse, a major trial for the 2015 Epsom Derby which attracted a strong field. The colt started 7/2 second favourite behind Jack Hobbs, with the other contenders including John F Kennedy, Nafaqa, Golden Horn (winner of the Feilden Stakes) and Ol' Man River (Beresford Stakes). Elm Park took the lead three furlongs from the finish but was overtaken in the final furlong and finished third behind Golden Horn and Jack Hobbs.

On 6 June, Elm Park, ridden by Atzeni, started the 9/1 fourth choice in the betting for the 236th running of the Epsom Derby. He started quickly and battled for the lead with Hans Holbein in the early stages as Atzeni struggled to restrain him. He was still among the leaders in the straight but tired badly in the last quarter mile and finished eleventh of the twelve runners behind Golden Horn.

Elm Park was off the course for more than three months after the Derby, before eventually reappearing in the Listed Fortune Stakes over one mile on soft ground at Sandown on 16 September. Starting the 4/7 favourite he took the lead after two furlongs and won "comfortably" by two lengths from the six-year-old Gabrial. The colt was then moved back up to Group One class for the Queen Elizabeth II Stakes at Ascot Racecourse a month later and started a 16/1 outsider. He led from the start but was overtaken approaching the final furlong and finished fifth of the nine runners behind Solow.

== Assessment ==
In the official International Classification for 2014, Elm Park was given a rating of 117, making him the third best two-year-old colt in Europe behind Belardo and the Middle Park Stakes winner Charming Thought.

== Pedigree ==
Pedigree of Elm Park, bay colt, 2012
Sire Phoenix Reach (IRE) 2000	Alhaarth (IRE); 1993	Unfuwain	Northern Dancer
Sire Phoenix Reach (IRE) 2000	Alhaarth (IRE); 1993	Unfuwain	Height of Fashion
Sire Phoenix Reach (IRE) 2000	Alhaarth (IRE); 1993	Irish Valley	Irish River
Sire Phoenix Reach (IRE) 2000	Alhaarth (IRE); 1993	Irish Valley	Green Valley
Sire Phoenix Reach (IRE) 2000	Carroll's Canyon (IRE); 1989	Hatim	Exclusive Native
Sire Phoenix Reach (IRE) 2000	Carroll's Canyon (IRE); 1989	Hatim	Sunday Purchase
Sire Phoenix Reach (IRE) 2000	Carroll's Canyon (IRE); 1989	Tuna	Silver Shark
Sire Phoenix Reach (IRE) 2000	Carroll's Canyon (IRE); 1989	Tuna	Vimelette
Dam Lady Brora (GB) 2005	Dashing Blade (GB); 1987	Elegant Air	Shirley Heights
Dam Lady Brora (GB) 2005	Dashing Blade (GB); 1987	Elegant Air	Elegant Tern
Dam Lady Brora (GB) 2005	Dashing Blade (GB); 1987	Sharp Castan	Sharpen Up
Dam Lady Brora (GB) 2005	Dashing Blade (GB); 1987	Sharp Castan	Sultry One
Dam Lady Brora (GB) 2005	Tweed Mill (GB); 1997	Selkirk	Sharpen Up
Dam Lady Brora (GB) 2005	Tweed Mill (GB); 1997	Selkirk	Annie Edge
Dam Lady Brora (GB) 2005	Tweed Mill (GB); 1997	Island Mill	Mill Reef
Dam Lady Brora (GB) 2005	Tweed Mill (GB); 1997	Island Mill	Siliciana (Family: 5-d)

- Through his dam, Elm Park was inbred 4 x 4 to Sharpen Up, meaning that this stallion appears twice in the fourth generation of his pedigree.
