= Arabian Queen =

Irish-bred Thoroughbred racehorse

- Racing silks of Jeff Smith
- Sire: Dubawi
- Grandsire: Dubai Millennium
- Dam: Barshiba
- Damsire: Barathea
- Sex: Mare
- Foaled: 23 February 2012
- Country: Ireland
- Colour: Bay
- Breeder: Littleton Stud
- Owner: Jeff Smith
- Trainer: David Elsworth
- Record: 16: 4-1-2
- Earnings: £718,916

Major wins
- Duchess of Cambridge Stakes (2014); Princess Elizabeth Stakes (2015); International Stakes (2015)
- Last updated on 14 September 2016

Arabian Queen (foaled 23 February 2012) is an Irish-bred, British-trained Thoroughbred racehorse. She showed good form as a juvenile, winning two races including the Duchess of Cambridge Stakes. In the following year she won the Princess Elizabeth Stakes but was beaten in her next three starts before recording an upset win over Golden Horn in the International Stakes.

== Background ==
Arabian Queen is a small bay mare with no white markings bred in Ireland by her owner, Jeff Smith's Littleton Stud. She was sired by Dubawi a top-class son of Dubai Millennium, whose wins included the Irish 2,000 Guineas and the Prix Jacques Le Marois. At stud, Dubawi has been a highly-successful breeding stallion, siring major winners such as Monterosso, Al Kazeem, Makfi, Lucky Nine and Night of Thunder. Arabian Queen is the first foal of her dam Barshiba, a high-class racemare who won the Lancashire Oaks in 2009 and 2010. Barshiba was a descendant of the broodmare Place d'Etoile who was the female-line ancestor of Northern Treasure (Irish 2,000 Guineas) and Oscar Schindler (Irish St. Leger).

The filly was sent into training with the veteran David Elsworth at Newmarket, Suffolk. Elsworth had trained Barshiba during her racing career as well as many other major winners including Desert Orchid and In the Groove.

== Racing career ==
=== 2014: two-year-old season ===
After finishing unplaced on her debut in a five furlong maiden race at Ascot Racecourse on 9 May and then recorded her first win in a similar event at Windsor Racecourse ten days later. At Royal Ascot in June she was moved up in class for the Group Two Queen Mary Stakes and started a 33/1 outsider. Ridden for the first time by Silvestre de Sousa, she finished sixth of the twenty-one runners behind the Irish-trained Anthem Alexander, who won by a neck from Tiggy Wiggy. In July the filly was ridden by Ryan Moore when she was stepped up to six furlong for the Duchess of Cambridge Stakes at Newmarket Racecourse and started second favourite behind the French-trained High Celebrity. Arabian Queen led from the start, accelerated approaching the final furlong and won by one and a quarter lengths from High Celebrity. After the race Elsworth said "She's a quick filly and had no luck at Ascot with the draw". Commenting on her future targets he said "We'll dwell on it. We'll probably take in races like the Cheveley Park and she would be up to a mile next year. She's precocious, she's got speed, she likes being trained."

The filly was well-beaten in her two subsequent starts, finishing fifth behind Muraaqaba in the Sweet Solera Stakes and sixth to Tiggy Wiggy in the Cheveley Park Stakes.

=== 2015: three-year-old season ===
On her first appearance as a three-year-old, Arabian Queen started at odds of 9/1 for the Group Three Princess Elizabeth Stakes over 8 1/2 furlongs at Epsom Downs Racecourse on 5 June. Ridden by de Sousa, she led from the start, drew away from her opponents in the last quarter mile and won by four lengths from Crowley's Law with the favoured Odeliz in third. The filly was moved up to Group One level for her next start, the Coronation Stakes over one mile at Royal Ascot in which she led until the final furlong before being overtaken and finishing fifth behind the French-trained Ervedya. In the Falmouth Stakes at Newmarket in July she was matched against older fillies for the first time. As at Ascot, she led for most of the way but faded in the closing stages, finishing last of the seven runners behind the four-year-old Amazing Maria. On 1 August she was moved up in distance for the Nassau Stakes over ten furlongs at Goodwood Racecourse. She started a 25/1 outsider but stayed on well in the closing stages and finished third of the nine runners behind Legatissimo and Wedding Vow.

Arabian Queen was the only filly in a seven-runner field for the International Stakes over 10 1/2 furlongs at York Racecourse on 19 August. The overwhelming favourite for the race was Golden Horn the unbeaten winner of The Derby and the Eclipse Stakes, with his main opposition appearing to come from The Grey Gatsby and the Tercentenary Stakes winner Time Test. In what had been described as "the race of the season", Arabian Queen was given little chance and started at odds of 50/1. She started quickly before settling in second place behind the pacemaker Dick Doughtywylie. She took the lead approaching the final furlong and held off a sustained challenge from Golden Horn to prevail by a neck, with a gap of three and a quarter lengths back to The Grey Gatsby in third.

After the race the 75-year-old Elsworth said "She's tenacious and she loves to battle. If we hadn’t turned up today, they would be hailing the favourite as the best since Frankel." When asked if she would stay further he said "It's a certainty. Her dam got a mile-and-a-half and she won the Lancashire Oaks twice, and it took me three years to find out her best trip, I’ve been a bit quicker with this one." De Sousa said "I was doing my own fractions and not looking at the pacemaker. Arabian Queen isn’t very big, but she has a big heart and when Golden Horn got a little bit ahead of me she just battled back". Jeff Smith said "She's a filly on an upward curve. I've been boring people by telling them that before this race no-one knew if the three-year-old fillies were as good as the three-year-old colts as they hadn't met. She has a wonderful temperament and loves her racing. She's just one of those that pops out and becomes a champion." He went on to suggest the British Champions Fillies' and Mares' Stakes as her end-of-year target.

Arabian Queen returned to action in the Prix Vermeille at Longchamp Racecourse on 12 September and started 13/2 second favourite behind the dual Prix de l'Arc de Triomphe winner Treve. She fought against De Sousa's attempts to restrain her in the early stages and after briefly looking capable of making a challenge in the straight she faded to finish sixth of the nine runners. In the British Champions Fillies' and Mares' Stakes at Ascot on 17 October she led for most of the way before tiring in the straight to finish sixth behind Simple Verse.

=== 2016: four-year-old season ===
Arabian Queen began her third season in the Dahlia Stakes over nine furlongs at Newmarket on 1 May. She led for most of the way but was overtaken in the last 100 yards and was beaten a length by the French-trained four-year-old Usherette. She was moved back up to Group One class for the Coronation Cup at Epsom on 4 June, but after racing in second place for most of the way she faded in the last quarter mile and finished unplaced behind Postponed. Arabian Queen reappeared after a three-month absence when dropped in class to run in the Listed John Musker Fillies' Stakes at Great Yarmouth on 14 September. She finished third, 1 1/4 lengths behind the winner So Mi Dar.

== Breeding record ==
Arabian Queen was retired from racing to become a broodmare for her owner's stud. Her first foal was a colt sired by Frankel and named Spirit Mixer.

== Pedigree ==
Pedigree of Arabian Queen (IRE), bay filly, 2012
Sire Dubawi (IRE) 2002	Dubai Millennium (GB); 1996	Seeking the Gold	Mr. Prospector
Sire Dubawi (IRE) 2002	Dubai Millennium (GB); 1996	Seeking the Gold	Con Game
Sire Dubawi (IRE) 2002	Dubai Millennium (GB); 1996	Colorado Dancer	Shareef Dancer
Sire Dubawi (IRE) 2002	Dubai Millennium (GB); 1996	Colorado Dancer	Fall Aspen
Sire Dubawi (IRE) 2002	Zomaradah (GB); 1995	Deploy	Shirley Heights
Sire Dubawi (IRE) 2002	Zomaradah (GB); 1995	Deploy	Slightly Dangerous
Sire Dubawi (IRE) 2002	Zomaradah (GB); 1995	Jawaher	Dancing Brave
Sire Dubawi (IRE) 2002	Zomaradah (GB); 1995	Jawaher	High Tern
Dam Barshiba (IRE) 2004	Barathea (IRE); 1990	Sadler's Wells	Northern Dancer
Dam Barshiba (IRE) 2004	Barathea (IRE); 1990	Sadler's Wells	Fairy Bridge
Dam Barshiba (IRE) 2004	Barathea (IRE); 1990	Brocade	Habitat
Dam Barshiba (IRE) 2004	Barathea (IRE); 1990	Brocade	Canton Silk
Dam Barshiba (IRE) 2004	Dashiba (GB); 1996	Dashing Blade	Elegant Air
Dam Barshiba (IRE) 2004	Dashiba (GB); 1996	Dashing Blade	Sharp Castan
Dam Barshiba (IRE) 2004	Dashiba (GB); 1996	Alsiba	Northfields
Dam Barshiba (IRE) 2004	Dashiba (GB); 1996	Alsiba	Etoile Grise (Family: 9-e)
