= Fortune Stakes =

Flat horse race in Britain

- Class: Listed
- Location: Sandown Park; Esher, England
- Race type: Flat / Thoroughbred
- Sponsor: Sporting Times / Sri Lanka
- Website: Sandown Park

Race information
- Distance: 1m (1,609 metres)
- Surface: Turf
- Track: Right-handed
- Qualification: Three-years-old and up exc. G1/G2 winners after 31 March
- Weight: 9 st 2 lb (3yo); 9 st 6 lb (4yo+); Allowances 5 lb for fillies Penalties; 3 lb for Listed winners* 5 lb for Group 3 winners* * after 31 March
- Purse: £45,000 (2025); 1st: £25,520

Fortune Stakes
2022
Bayside Boy	Sweet Believer	Escobar

Previous years
2021
Mostahdaf	Escobar	Sir Busker

2020-2011
2020
Posted	Montatham	Lavender's Blue
2019
King Of Change	Turgenev	Silver Line
2018
Wadilsafa	Hathal	Red Starlight
2017
Khafoo Shememi	Hors De Combat	Larchmont Lad
2016
Quebee	Yorker	Muwaary
2015
Elm Park	Gabrial	Fire Ship
2014
Tenor	Producer	Emell
2013
Penitent	Boomshackerlacker	Bana Wu
2012
Fulbright	Tazahum	Gabrial
2011
Lay Time	Fontley	Emerald Commander

2010-2001
2010
Penitent	Skysurfers	Bronze Cannon
2009
Bankable	Ada River	Cadre
2008
Atlantic Sport	Dijeerr	Icelandic
2007
Eisteddfod	Bygone Days	Assertive
2006
Quito	Mine	Dabbers Ridge
2005
Suggestive	Cupid's Glory	Caesar Beware
2004
Mac Love	Peter Paul Rubens	Vanderlin
2003
Monsieur Bond	Vanderlin	Topkamp
2002
Atavus	Royal Quarters	Meshaheer
2001
Bouncing Bowdler	Russian Rhapsody	Tumbleweed Ridge

2000-1991
2000
Nicobar	Veil of Avalon	Warningford
1999
Tumbleweed Ridge	Selfish	Intimaa
1998
Lilli Claire	Wenda	Ramooz
1997
Intikhab	Almushtarak	Crimson Tide
1996
Centre Stalls	Wizard King	Verzen
1995
Bin Ajwaad	Realities	Lap of Luxury
1994
Soviet Line	Polish Laughter	Storiths
1993
Tinners Way	Cloud Of Dust	Ardkinglass
1992
Calling Collect	Night Manoeuvres	Hazaam
1991
Selkirk	Susurration	Zonda

1990-1988
1990
Thakib	Batzushka	Princess Accord
1989
Rain Burst	Point House	Folly Foot
1988
Sweet Chesne	Just A Flutter	Jannubi

The Fortune Stakes is a Listed flat horse race in Great Britain open to horses aged three years or older. It is run at Sandown Park over a distance of 1 mile (1,609 metres), and it is scheduled to take place each year in September.

The race was run at Kempton Park until 1996, at Epsom between 1997 and 2007 and at Haydock Park in 2008.

The current name was adopted in 1991, the race previously being known as the Glint of Gold Stakes.

The race held Listed status until 1996 and this was reinstated in 2003.

== Winners ==
Year	Winner	Age	Jockey	Trainer	Time
1987	Accompanist	3	Willie Carson	Barry Hills	1:42.56
1988	Sweet Chesne	3	Willie Ryan	Henry Cecil	1:40.34
1989	Rain Burst	3	Ray Cochrane	Luca Cumani	1:40.33
1990	Thakib	3	Willie Carson	John Gosden	1:38.89
1991	Selkirk	3	Ray Cochrane	Ian Balding	1:36.43
1992	Calling Collect	3	Frankie Dettori	Luca Cumani	1:41.26
1993	Tinners Way	3	Pat Eddery	John Gosden	1:36.96
1994	Soviet Line	4	Walter Swinburn	Michael Stoute	1:40.14
1995	Bin Ajwaad	5	John Reid	Ben Hanbury	1:40.86
1996	Centre Stalls	3	John Reid	Fulke Johnson Houghton	1:37.18
1997	Intikhab	3	Gary Carter	David Morley	1:43.67
1998	Lilli Claire	5	Tim Sprake	David Elsworth	1:49.37
1999	Tumbleweed Ridge	6	Mark Tebbutt	Brian Meehan	1:21.83
2000	Nicobar	3	Michael Hills	Ian Balding	1:22.13
2001	Bouncing Bowdler	3	Richard Hills	Mark Johnston	1:27.15
2002	Atavus	5	Jamie Mackay	George Margarson	1:22.73
2003	Monsieur Bond	3	Robert Winston	Bryan Smart	1:21.76
2004	Mac Love	3	Gary Carter	John Akehurst	1:21.34
2005	Suggestive	7	Nicky Mackay	William Haggas	1:22.17
2006	Quito	9	Jimmy Fortune	David Chapman	1:33.62
2007	Eisteddfod	6	Nelson De Souza	Paul Cole	1:29.49
2008	Atlantic Sport	3	Eddie Creighton	Mick Channon	1:32.48
2009	Bankable	5	Ryan Moore	Gary Moore	1:45.28
2010	Penitent	4	Richard Hughes	William Haggas	1:44.49
2011	Lay Time	3	David Probert	Andrew Balding	1:39.69
2012	Fulbright	3	Silvestre de Sousa	Mark Johnston	1:41.78
2013	Penitent	7	Daniel Tudhope	David O'Meara	1:48.08
2014	Tenor	4	Adam Kirby	John Ryan	1:42.18
2015	Elm Park	3	Andrea Atzeni	Andrew Balding	1:48.11
2016	Quebee	3	Harry Bentley	Clive Cox	1:42.50
2017	Khafoo Shememi	3	Sean Levey	Richard Hannon Jr.	1:43.65
2018	Wadilsafa	3	Jim Crowley	Owen Burrows	1:43.40
2019	King of Change	3	Sean Levey	Richard Hannon Jr.	1:42.60
2020	Posted	4	William Buick	Richard Hannon Jr.	1:42.87
2021	Mostahdaf	3	Jim Crowley	John and Thady Gosden	1:47.24
2022	Bayside Boy	3	William Buick	Roger Varian	1:47.52
2023	Chindit	5	Pat Dobbs	Richard Hannon Jr.	1:50.08
2024	Skellet	3	Hector Crouch	Ralph Beckett	1:42.07
2025	Cicero's Gift	5	Jason Watson	Charlie Hills	1:46.40
2026	Cerro Blanco	3	William Buick	Charlie Appleby	1:44.72

== See also ==
- Horse racing in Great Britain
- List of British flat horse races
