= Epicuris =

British-bred Thoroughbred racehorse

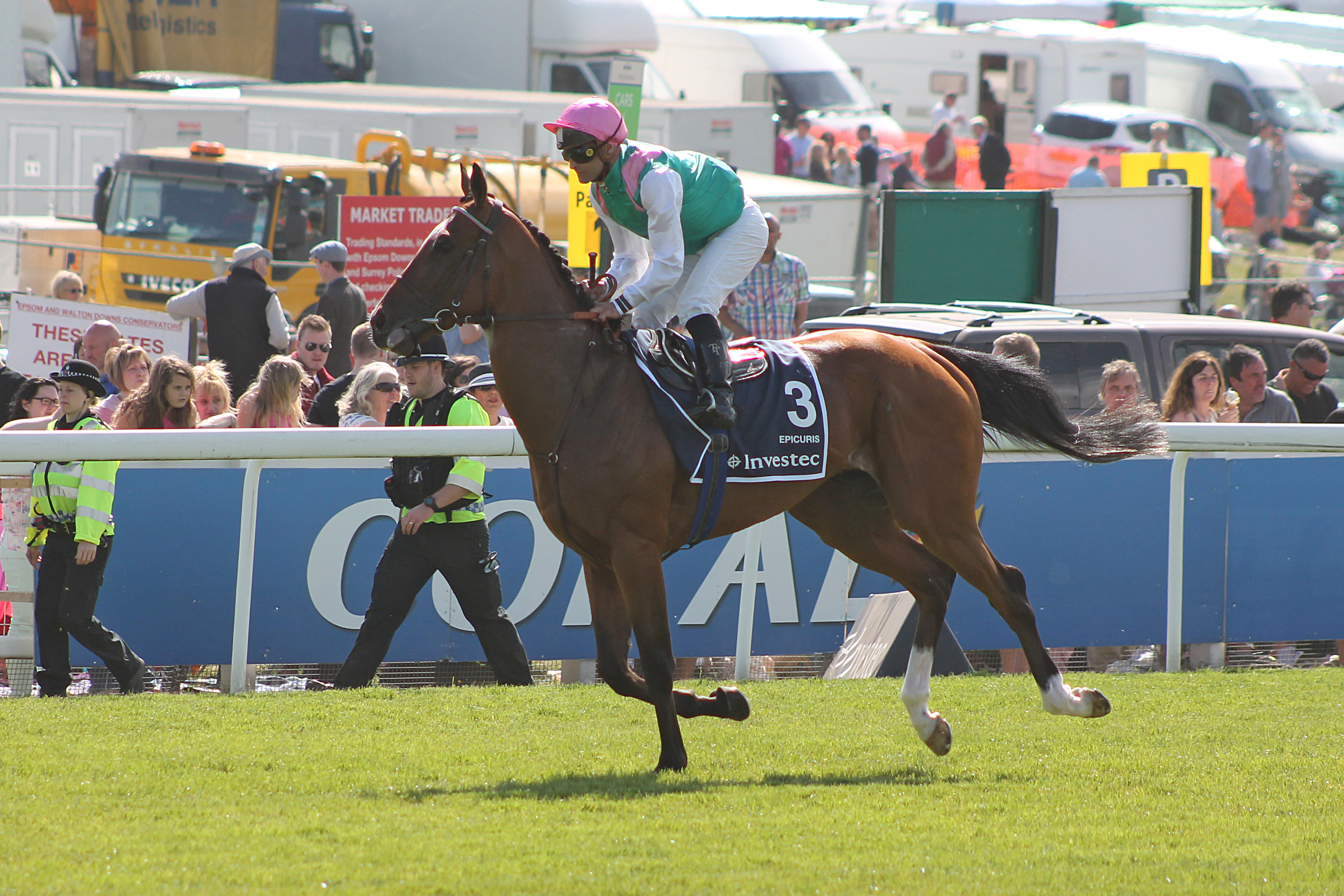
- Epicuris at 2015 Epsom Derby
- Sire: Rail Link
- Grandsire: Dansili
- Dam: Argumentative
- Damsire: Observatory
- Sex: Colt
- Foaled: 2 March 2012
- Country: United Kingdom
- Color: Bay
- Breeder: Juddmonte Farms
- Owner: Khalid Abdullah
- Trainer: Criquette Head-Maarek
- Record: 6: 3-1-0
- Earnings: £220,407

Major wins
- Prix de Condé (2014); Critérium de Saint-Cloud (2014)

Epicuris (foaled 2 March 2012) is a British-bred, French-trained Thoroughbred racehorse. He was one of the leading juveniles in France in 2014 when he was unbeaten in three starts including the Prix de Condé and the Critérium de Saint-Cloud. He was beaten when favourite on his 2015 debut and refused to enter the starting stalls for his next race. He finished fifth in the 2015 Epsom Derby.

== Background ==
Epicuris is a bay colt bred in England by his owner, Khalid Abdullah's Juddmonte Farms. His sire Rail Link won the Prix de l'Arc de Triomphe in 2006. Rail Link was not a conspicuously successful breeding stallion but has sired some good winners including Spillway (Australian Cup) and Last Train (Prix de Barbeville). Epicuris is the first foal of his dam Argumentative, who won one minor race from three starts. She was descended from the broodmare Miss Glasso whose other descendants have included Sanglamore and the Poule d'Essai des Pouliches winner Matiara.

The colt was sent into training with Criquette Head-Maarek at Chantilly. He has been ridden in all of his races by Thierry Thulliez.

== Racing career ==
=== 2014: two-year-old season ===
Epicuris began his racing career in a maiden race over 1600 metres at Longchamp Racecourse on 1 September. He started at odds of 6.2/1 and won by three quarters of a length and one and a half lengths from Mister Dancer and the Alain de Royer-Dupré-trained favourite Karaktar. At the same course on 19 October, the colt was stepped up in class and started 7/4 favourite for the Group Three Prix de Condé over 1800 metres on very soft ground. He took the lead soon after the start and won by two and a half lengths from the André Fabre-trained Big Blue. Epicuris was again stepped up in class and distance for the Group One Critérium de Saint-Cloud over 2000 metres on 8 November. Big Blue was again in opposition along with the Irish-trained Clonard Street (runner-up in the Beresford Stakes), the British challenger Crafty Choice (Zetland Stakes) and Palang from Germany. Starting the 10/11 favourite, Epicuris led from the start and won "comfortably" by two and a half lengths from Palang.

=== 2015: three-year-old season ===
On his three-year-old debut, Epicuris started odds-on favourite for the Group Three Prix La Force at Longchamp on 6 April. Thulliez attempted to make all the running, but Epicuris was overtaken 200 metres from the finish and finished second, beaten four lengths by Silverware. The colt was scheduled to return in the Prix Greffulhe at Saint-Cloud Racecourse on 5 May but refused to enter the starting stalls and was withdrawn from the race.

Head employed the horse behavioural expert Nicolas Blondeau to help the colt overcome his fear of the starting stalls, and the results were positive. When France Galop (the governing body of French racing) refused to allow Blondeau to accompany the colt at the start of the Prix du Jockey Club, Head opted to reroute Epicuris to The Derby. At Epsom, Epicuris started a 20/1 outsider and raced prominently for most of the race before tiring in the closing stages and finishing fifth of the twelve runners behind Golden Horn. In July at Maisons-Laffitte Racecourse on 19 July Epicuris started favourite for the Group Two Prix Eugène Adam over 2000 metres but again faded towards the finish and finished fourth of the six runners behind Dariyan.

In September Head-Maarek announced that the colt was unlikely to run again in 2015 but added that he "could make a nice four-year-old".

== Pedigree ==
Pedigree of Epicuris, bay colt, 2012
Sire Rail Link (GB) 2003	Dansili (USA); 1996	Danehill	Danzig
Sire Rail Link (GB) 2003	Dansili (USA); 1996	Danehill	Razyana
Sire Rail Link (GB) 2003	Dansili (USA); 1996	Hasili	Kahyasi
Sire Rail Link (GB) 2003	Dansili (USA); 1996	Hasili	Kerali
Sire Rail Link (GB) 2003	Docklands (USA); 1989	Theatrical	Nureyev
Sire Rail Link (GB) 2003	Docklands (USA); 1989	Theatrical	Tree of Knowledge
Sire Rail Link (GB) 2003	Docklands (USA); 1989	Dockage	Riverman
Sire Rail Link (GB) 2003	Docklands (USA); 1989	Dockage	Golden Alibi
Dam Argumentative (GB) 2007	Observatory (USA); 1997	Distant View	Mr. Prospector
Dam Argumentative (GB) 2007	Observatory (USA); 1997	Distant View	Seven Springs
Dam Argumentative (GB) 2007	Observatory (USA); 1997	Stellaria	Roberto
Dam Argumentative (GB) 2007	Observatory (USA); 1997	Stellaria	Victoria Star
Dam Argumentative (GB) 2007	Discuss (USA); 2002	Danzig	Northern Dancer
Dam Argumentative (GB) 2007	Discuss (USA); 2002	Danzig	Pas de Nom
Dam Argumentative (GB) 2007	Discuss (USA); 2002	Private Line	Private Account
Dam Argumentative (GB) 2007	Discuss (USA); 2002	Private Line	Miss Summer (Family: 1-l)

- Epicuris is inbred 3 x 4 to Danzig, meaning that this stallion appears in both the third and fourth generations of his pedigree.
