= Golden Horn (horse) =

British-bred Thoroughbred racehorse

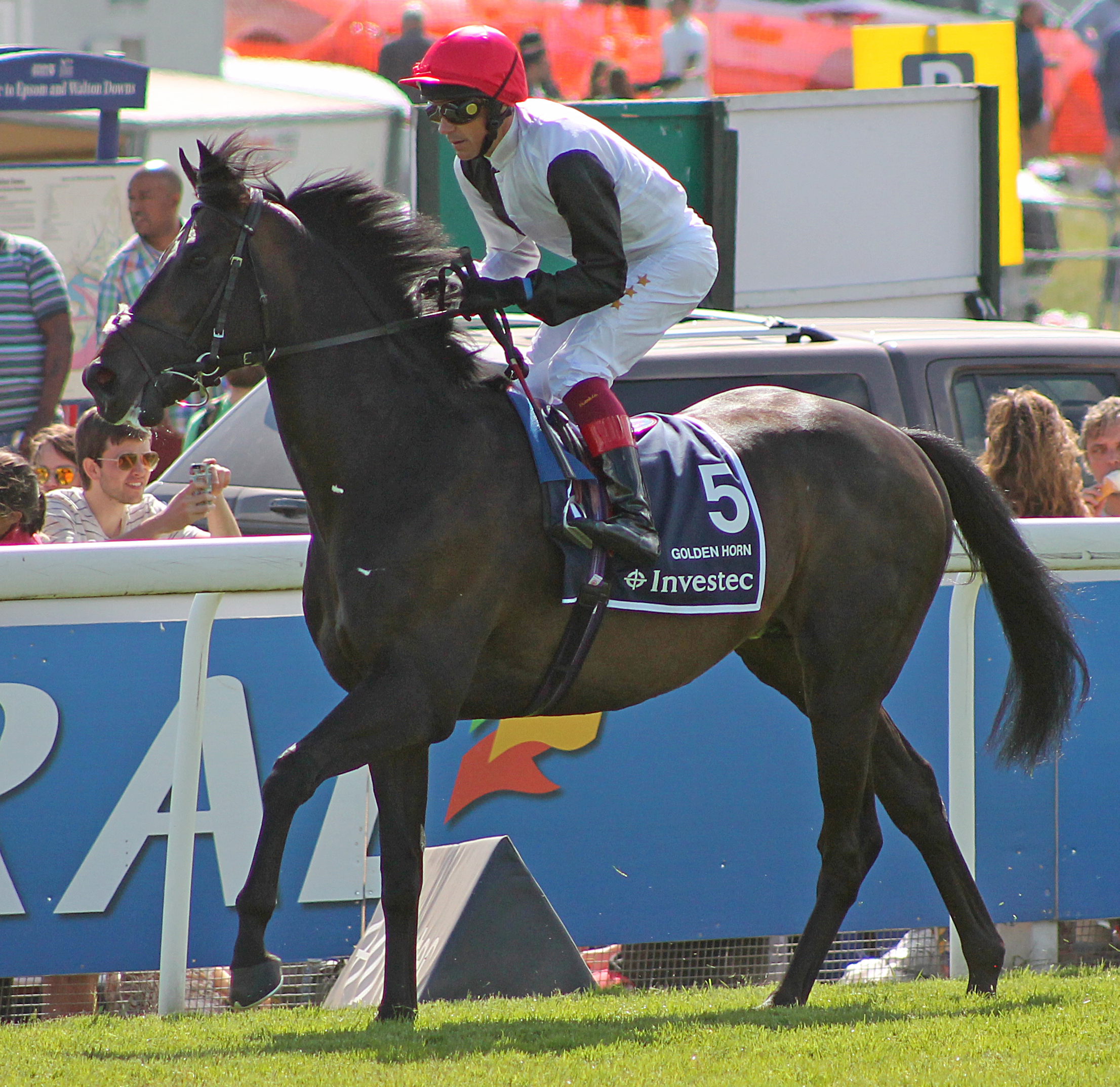
- Golden Horn at the 2015 Epsom Derby
- Sire: Cape Cross
- Grandsire: Green Desert
- Dam: Fleche d'Or
- Damsire: Dubai Destination
- Sex: Stallion
- Foaled: 27 March 2012
- Country: United Kingdom
- Color: Brown
- Breeder: Hascombe and Valiant Studs
- Owner: Anthony Oppenheimer
- Trainer: John Gosden
- Record: 9: 7-2-0
- Earnings: £4,092,497

Major wins
- Feilden Stakes (2015); Dante Stakes (2015); Epsom Derby (2015); Eclipse Stakes (2015); Irish Champion Stakes (2015); Prix de l'Arc de Triomphe (2015)

Awards
- Cartier Champion Three-year-old Colt (2015); Cartier Horse of the Year (2015); Timeform rating: 134
- Last updated on 14 March 2025

Golden Horn (foaled 27 March 2012) is a British Thoroughbred racehorse and breeding stallion who was the 2015 European Horse of the Year after winning the Derby, Eclipse Stakes, Irish Champion Stakes and Arc de Triomphe and coming second in the Breeders' Cup Turf.

In a racing career which lasted from October 2014 until October 2015 Golden Horn won seven of his nine races. He was bred in England by his owner Anthony Oppenheimer and trained by John Gosden.

After winning his only race as a two-year-old in 2014, Golden Horn won the Feilden Stakes and then established himself as favourite for the 2015 Epsom Derby with a victory over a strong field in the Dante Stakes. After his owner paid a £75,000 supplementary entry fee, Golden Horn won the Derby on 6 June. He then finished first in the Eclipse Stakes. Golden Horn lost his unbeaten record in the Juddmonte International. He went on to win a controversial race for the Irish Champion Stakes in September before a victory in the Prix de l'Arc de Triomphe. Golden Horn ended his racing career by finishing second in the Breeders' Cup Turf.

== Background ==
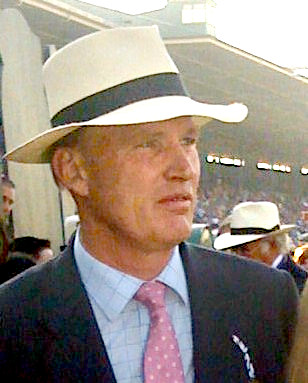
John Gosden, Golden Horn's trainer

Golden Horn is a brown horse with no white markings bred in England by his owner Anthony Oppenheimer's Hascombe and Valiant Stud. Oppenheimer is a member of the family that controlled the De Beers Mining Company. Golden Horn was sired by Cape Cross a leading miler who won the Lockinge Stakes in 1998 and the Queen Anne Stakes in the following year. As a breeding stallion Cape Cross, who stands at the Kildangan Stud in County Kildare has had considerable success, being the sire of Ouija Board, Sea the Stars and Able One.

Golden Horn's dam, Fleche d'Or, was an unraced daughter of Dubai Destination and came from a family which had produced several major winners for the Oppenheimers. Her half-sister Rebecca Sharp was a top-class racemare who won the Coronation Stakes and finished second in the Queen Elizabeth II Stakes, whilst her great-grandmother Lora produced the 1000 Guineas and Sussex Stakes winner On The House. Other descendants of Lora's dam Courtessa have included Habibti and the Australian champions Danewin and Octagonal. Nine months after foaling Golden Horn, Fleche d'Or was sent to the Tattersalls Breeding Stock sale in December 2012 and bought for 62,000 guineas by Harry McAlmont of the Norelands Stud. Golden Horn was offered for sale as a yearling in October 2013 at Tattersalls but was bought back by his breeder when the bidding stopped at 190,000 guineas.

The colt was sent into training with John Gosden at his Clarehaven Stables in Newmarket, Suffolk. Gosden is a British native (the son of John "Towser" Gosden) who began his training career in California in 1980 and had his first major success with Bates Motel in 1984. He left the United States in 1989 and has trained in Britain ever since. His other major winners in Europe have included Kingman, Taghrooda, Ravens Pass, Nathaniel and Benny the Dip.

== Racing career ==
=== 2014: two-year-old season ===
Golden Horn made his first and only appearance as a two-year-old in an eight-runner maiden race over eight and a half furlongs at Nottingham Racecourse on 29 October 2014. Ridden by William Buick he started the 15/8 second favourite behind the William Haggas-trained Storm The Stars. He started slowly, but recovered to make progress in the second half of the race and was switched to the wide outside by Buick three furlongs from the finish. Despite showing inexperience (running "green") he took the lead inside the final furlong and won by a head from Storm The Stars, with the pair finishing seven lengths clear of the others. The runner-up went on to finish second in the Chester Vase and win both the Cocked Hat Stakes and the Great Voltigeur Stakes in 2015.

=== 2015: three-year-old season ===
==== Trial races ====
On his three-year-old debut, Golden Horn was ridden by the veteran Frankie Dettori in the Listed Feilden Stakes over nine furlongs on the Rowley Mile course at Newmarket on 15 April and was made the 2/1 favourite ahead of the previously unbeaten Godolphin colt Festive Fare and the Queen's runner Peacock (trained by Richard Hannon Jr.). He was restrained by Dettori in the early stages before making a forward move two furlongs out, taking the lead approaching the final furlong (despite hanging to the left) and winning by one and a half lengths from Peacock.

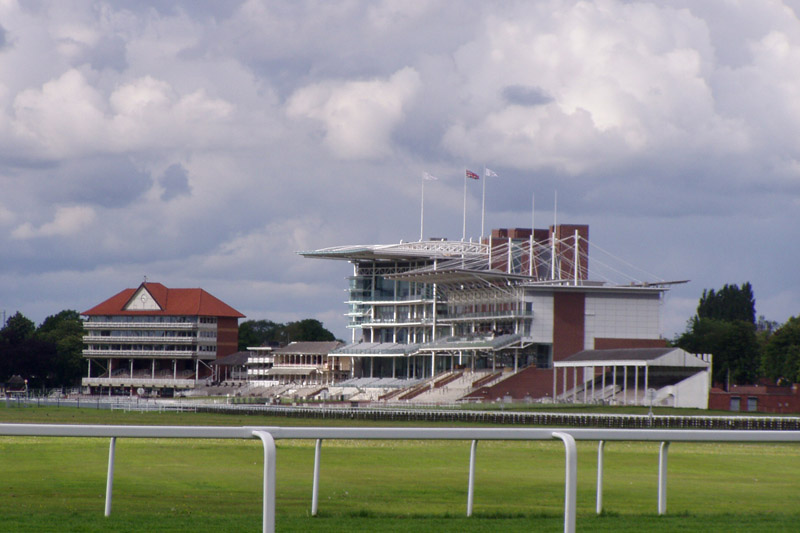
York Racecourse

On 14 May Golden Horn was moved up in class to contest the Group Two Dante Stakes at York Racecourse, a major trial for the 2015 Epsom Derby which attracted a strong field. Ridden by Buick colt started 4/1 third favourite behind Jack Hobbs (also trained by Gosden), and Elm Park with the other contenders including the Aidan O'Brien-trained pair John F Kennedy and Ol' Man River (winner of the Beresford Stakes). Golden Horn was restrained by Buick in the early stages as the outsider Lord Ben Stack led, before moving into contention three furlongs from the finish. He moved past Elm Park to take the lead inside the final furlong and drew away to win by two and three quarter lengths from Jack Hobbs, with Elm Park three and a quarter lengths back in third. Golden Horn had not been entered for the Epsom Derby and Oppenheimer was initially unwilling to pay the £75,000 supplementary entry fee as he believed that the colt's pedigree meant that he was unlikely to stay the Derby distance of one and a half miles. The Prix du Jockey Club was named as a probable target. After discussions with Gosden however, Oppenheimer agreed to supplement the horse and Golden Horn was elevated to the position of ante-post favourite for the Derby.

==== Epsom Derby ====
On 6 June, Golden Horn started the 13/8 favourite for the 236th running of the Derby over one and a half miles at Epsom Downs Racecourse. As Buick was required to ride Jack Hobbs for the Godolphin Racing team, Golden Horn was ridden again by Frankie Dettori. Elm Park was again in opposition as well as Storm The Stars and the leading French colt Epicuris. The Aidan O'Brien stable was represented by Hans Holbein (Chester Vase), Kilimanjaro (Lingfield Derby Trial) and Giovanni Canaletto (full-brother of the 2013 winner Ruler of the World). Dettori restrained the horse towards the rear of the field as Elm Park and Hans Holbein duelled for the lead in the early stages. In the straight Golden Horn made rapid progress on the outside, overtook Jack Hobbs a furlong from the finish and won by three and a half lengths from his stable companion with Storm The Stars four and a half lengths back in third place.

Dettori commented "What an unbelievable day. I was excited at the big job ahead of me, but it all went like clockwork from start to finish. When you're young, you don't really appreciate the full importance of this Derby, so it means a great deal to win it for a second time. I've had a colourful life, but I'm not finished". Before the race Dettori had requested some "lucky white tape" for his stirrup: the tape had previously been used to repair Willie Carson's saddle before his win on Nashwan and had been applied to Dettori's stirrup when he won on Authorized in 2007. Gosden, who was winning the race for the second time, after Benny the Dip's success in 1997, commented "The last thing I said to Frankie was ride a cool race and he rode a cool race—he waited and waited. He's a proper horse." On the following day Gosden indicated that the Eclipse Stakes would be the colt's most likely next target.

British and Irish bookmakers reportedly sustained heavy losses on the race, largely due to Dettori's popularity with the general public. A spokesperson for Paddy Power said "Frankie is the only jockey the whole world and his dog knows and his win means the bookies have done their absolute conkers".

==== Eclipse Stakes ====
On 4 July, Golden Horn was matched against older horses for the first time when he was brought back in distance to contest the 120th running of the Eclipse Stakes over ten furlongs at Sandown Park Racecourse. He started the 4/9 favourite against four opponents headed by The Grey Gatsby, with the other runners being Cougar Mountain (third in the Queen Anne Stakes), Western Hymn (Prix Eugène Adam, Gordon Richards Stakes, Brigadier Gerard Stakes) and Tullius (Sandown Mile). With no recognised front-runner in the race, Frankie Dettori had admitted that: "There is a possibility we could make the running if no-one else wants to. Otherwise we will sit off it. Golden Horn is very versatile but what we don’t want is a messy race. He is a Derby winner not a sprinter". Gosden was not overly enthusiastic about the colt's chances saying "I have a lot of respect for The Grey Gatsby... these are top older horses we’re taking on... any horse can get beaten" and described the horse's position as odds-on favourite as "a bit unusual". As in the Derby, Dettori had a "lucky" piece of kit: the left boot he had worn at Epsom had been ripped at Royal Ascot, but the jockey insisted on having it repaired by his valet and wore it at Sandown.

Dettori sent the colt into the lead from the start with The Grey Gatsby racing in second ahead of Western Hymn, Cougar Mountain and Tullius. As the horses entered the straight, The Grey Gatsby moved up alongside the favourite and the two horses raced together in what BBC Sport described as a "gripping duel" until Golden Horn accelerated clear approaching the final furlong to win by three and a half lengths. There was a further gap of four and a half lengths back to Western Hymn in third. He became the tenth winner of the Derby to win the Eclipse in the same season following Flying Fox (1899), Diamond Jubilee (1900), Lemberg (1910), Coronach (1926), Blue Peter (1939), Tulyar (1952), Mill Reef (1971), Nashwan (1989) and Sea the Stars (2009). The Racing Post's Sam Walker rated Golden Horn's victory as the best performance in the world in 2015 up to 6 July, placing him four pounds in front of Shared Belief and five ahead of American Pharoah.

Commenting on the colt's success, Dettori said "I had an easy lead, but Jamie [Spencer, on The Grey Gatsby] was very clever. He attacked early, he eyeballed me, but the horse showed what a true champion he is. He has a lot of guts and was going away at the end." After the race Oppenheimer was reportedly keen to run the colt in the King George VI and Queen Elizabeth Stakes but Gosden was cautious in outlining future plans saying "a day at a time, a week at the time, the horse’ll tell me. I watch, I listen, that's my job. It's up to the horse". He did however, suggest that the Prix de l'Arc de Triomphe could be a long-term target but added that the colt would not run if the ground was "bottomless".

==== King George VI and Queen Elizabeth Stakes ====
Three weeks after the Eclipse, Golden Horn was the only three-year-old scheduled to contest the 55th running of the King George VI and Queen Elizabeth Stakes over one and a half miles at Ascot Racecourse. On the eve of the race, Gosden indicated that colt had made further progress, saying "Golden Horn's been fine since the Eclipse and even progressed physically – he's filled out. We always thought that he was a good, proper horse, but he just seems that much more streetwise – harder and tougher now." Heavy rain on the day before the race softened the ground and led to the withdrawal of the only French challenger Flintshire. After walking the course on the morning of the race, Gosden withdrew Golden Horn, saying "It is very frustrating... The ground in the straight would be no problem – it's just the old track. It rides deep, deep down there and holding. If it was all on the new track I wouldn't hesitate on running, but it is not. Once I got down to Swinley Bottom the stick went in 12 inches and made a pop sound as it came out... He can go on good to soft no problem. He can probably go on genuine soft, but I don't want to involve him in a sticky, holding ground". In Golden Horn's absence the race was won by Postponed.

==== International Stakes ====
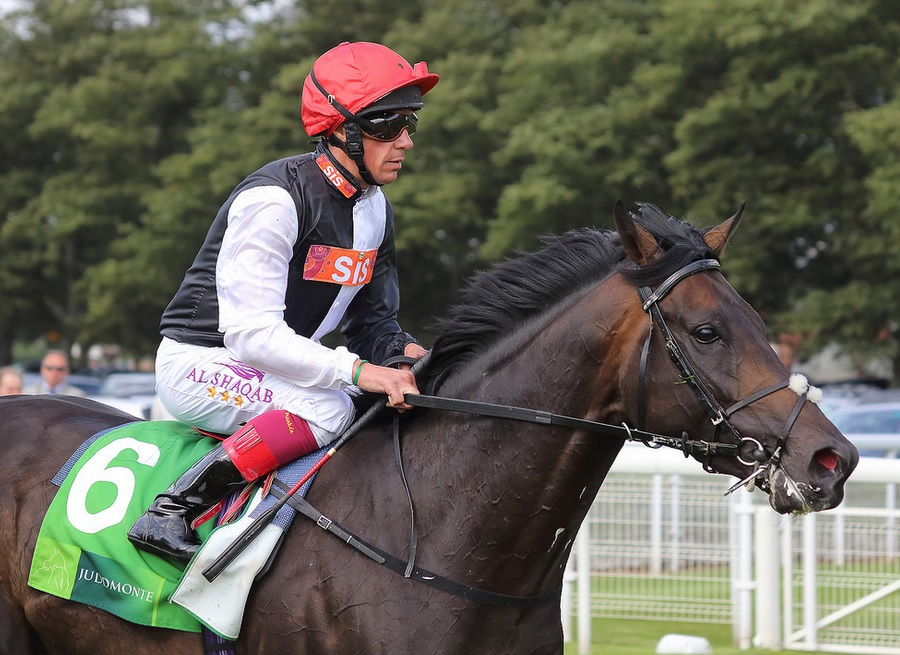
Golden Horn and Frankie Dettori

The International Stakes at York (run over the same course and distance as the Dante Stakes) was expected to feature a clash between Golden Horn and the 2000 Guineas winner Gleneagles. The highly anticipated contest was described as "the race of the season" with the other contenders including The Grey Gatsby and the impressive Royal Ascot winner Time Test. In the build-up to the race Dettori said "It's a great line-up. It's an absolute cracker, possibly the race of the year. You've got all the best horses racing each other. York is very slick, very flat. You need a horse with pace and gears. If you've got any chinks in your armour, you'll be found out."

The field was reduced to seven when Gleneagles was withdrawn owing to the rain-softened ground and Golden Horn started the 4/9 favourite ahead of Time Test and The Grey Gatsby with the other runners being Criterion from Australia (Australian Derby), Cougar Mountain from Ireland (Desmond Stakes), the British filly Arabian Queen and the seven-year-old gelding Dick Doughtywylie, who was acting as a pacemaker for the favourite. Golden Horn pulled hard against Dettori's attempts to restrain him in the early stages and raced in third behind Dick Doughtywylie and Arabian Queen. He made a forward move in the straight, moving up outside the leader Arabian Queen a furlong out but sustained his first defeat, finishing a neck behind the filly. After the race Dettori commented "The horse was more keen than usual today and the ground being the way it was, he couldn’t use his turn of foot. It's a great shame, but this is racing".

==== Irish Champion Stakes ====
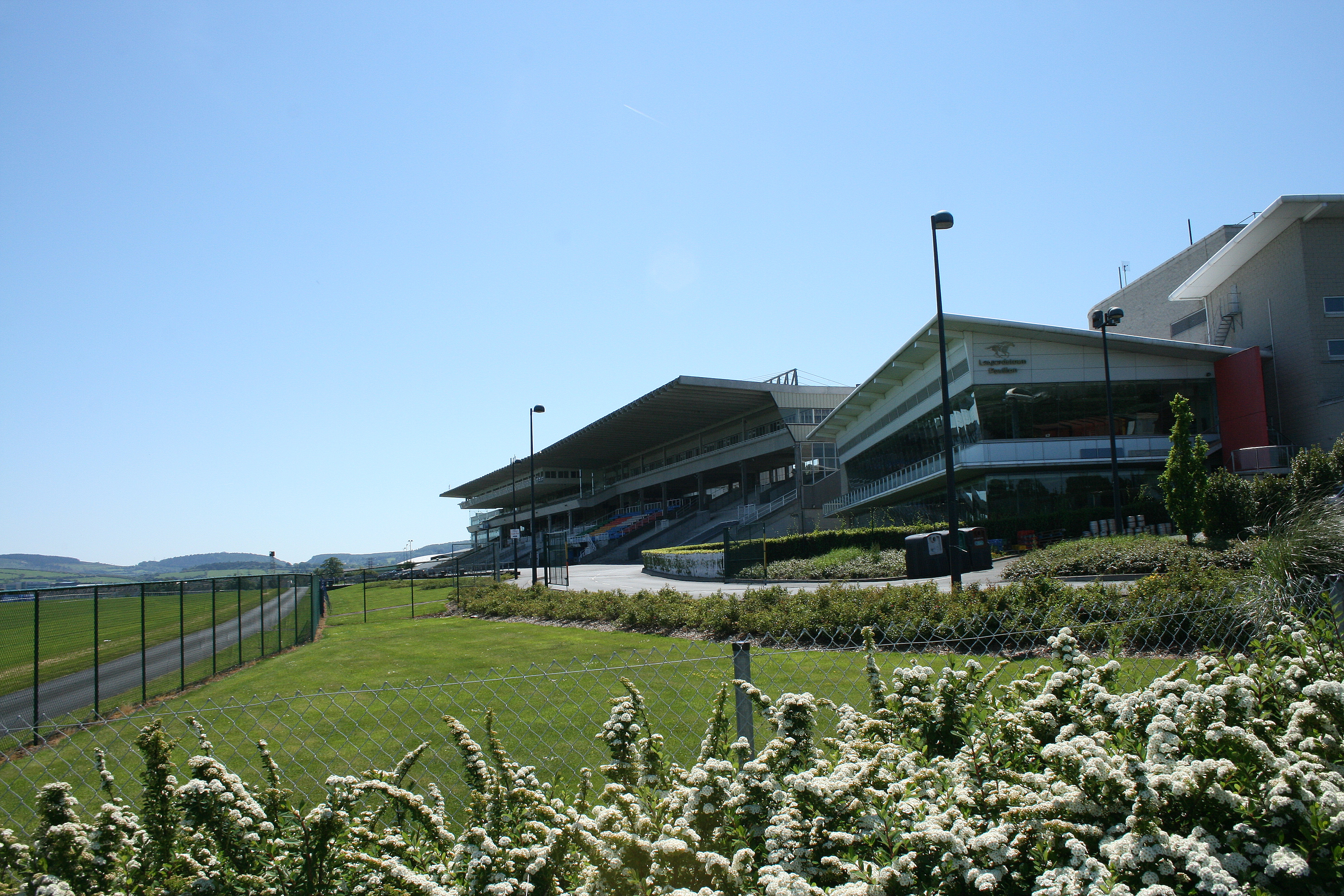
Leopardstown Racecourse, where Golden Horn hon the Irish Champion Stakes

Golden Horn's comeback came in the Irish Champion Stakes at Leopardstown Racecourse on 12 September. In the build-up to the race he was reported to have been performing impressively in training although Gosden warned that the colt might not run if the ground were to be unsuitably soft. The ground at Leopardstown was described as "yielding", which was enough to see the withdrawal of Gleneagles, but Golden Horn took up his engagement and was made the 5/4 favourite. His six opponents were Free Eagle, Found, The Grey Gatsby, Cirrus des Aigles, Pleascach (Irish 1000 Guineas, Yorkshire Oaks) and Highland Reel (Secretariat Stakes).

Dettori sent the colt into the lead soon after the start and set the pace from Highland Reel, Pleascach, Free Eagle and Found. Two furlongs from the finish Free Eagle made a forward move but as he challenged the favourite, Golden Horn veered to the right, hampering his challenger. Golden Horn kept on well in the closing stages to win by a length from Found, who stayed on to deprive Free Eagle of second. Following an inquiry by the racecourse stewards the result was allowed to stand. Dettori said "It was a stellar field and he was showing what a good horse he is. Pat [Smullen, on Free Eagle] came to me then I gave him a couple of cracks and I got the measure of him and I thought, right, come on, let's go home. All of a sudden, he just took a right turn. He must have seen something". Gosden offered the view that the horse had swerved because of the shadow cast across the course by the grandstand.

==== Prix de l'Arc de Triomphe ====
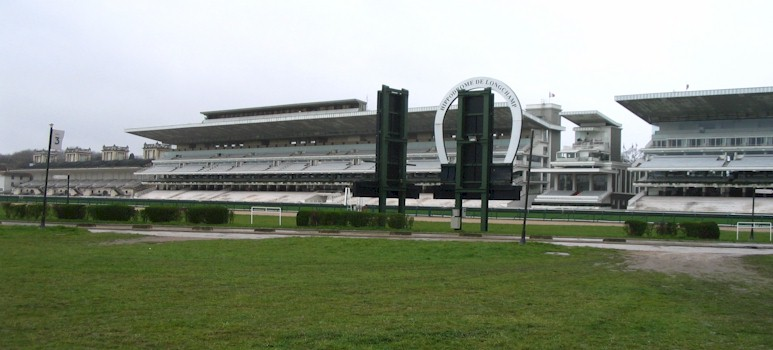
Longchamp Racecourse, where Golden Horn won the Prix de l'Arc de Triomphe

On 4 October 2015 Golden Horn was one of seventeen horses to contest the 94th running of the Prix de l'Arc de Triomphe over 2400 metres at Longchamp Racecourse. As he had not been among the original entries for the race, Oppenheimer had to pay a supplementary entry fee of €120,000. The draw for starting stalls saw Golden Horn allotted the fourteenth stall, on the wide outside of the field: Dettori commented "I’d have loved a single-figure number but we’ll have to deal with what we’ve got. We will make a plan." Gosden initially said "We are used to a wide draw in the Arc as Taghrooda had one last year and spent most of her time on that bicycle track they have around the outside of the course at Longchamp. We expected a high draw and we got one." He later explained that he was not suggesting any unfairness saying "I was merely having a joke... I'm sorry if other people don't have a sense of humour". Golden Horn started the 9/2 third favourite behind Treve who was attempting to win the race for the third time and New Bay, the winner of the Prix du Jockey Club. Found and Free Eagle were again in opposition and the other runners included Flintshire, Erupt (Grand Prix de Paris) and Dolniya (Sheema Classic).

At the start, Dettori tracked to the left and sent Golden Horn to the far outside where he raced alone in the early stages before moving back to the inside and settling in second behind the pacemaker Shahah. Golden Horn took the lead entering the straight, opened up a clear advantage entering the last 200 metres and won by two lengths from Flintshire. New Bay and Treve were close behind in third and fourth places.

Dettori, who was winning the race for a record-equalling fourth time, said "I really believed in the horse. I was going so fast in the last 300 metres I knew no other horse would pass me. I had the best horse and I wanted to show how good he is. His record is unbelievable and he is probably the best horse I have ridden". Gosden, who was winning the race for the first time said "It's great to win the Arc in France and the Derby in England – that's what it's about. When you're drawn wide, if you stay wide for a long time, you can run your own little race and not be bothered by anyone and then slot across. It was perfect as we sat behind the pacemaker and then kicked because as Frankie says, if you don't kick at a certain time here they come like arrows at your back". He also suggested that the horse might make a final appearance in the Breeders' Cup Turf, saying "The owner is keen on the Breeders' Cup. It's a month away. If he's in good order, there's no reason we couldn't go there".

==== Breeders' Cup Turf ====
Gosden reported the horse to be in excellent condition after his Arc win commenting "He's got such a constitution, you can hardly see a rib which is not usually the case at the end of a long campaign" and the colt was sent to the United States to contest the Breeders' Cup Turf at Keeneland Racecourse on 31 October. Before shipping to Kentucky he reported worked well in an exercise on the long gallop at Newmarket.

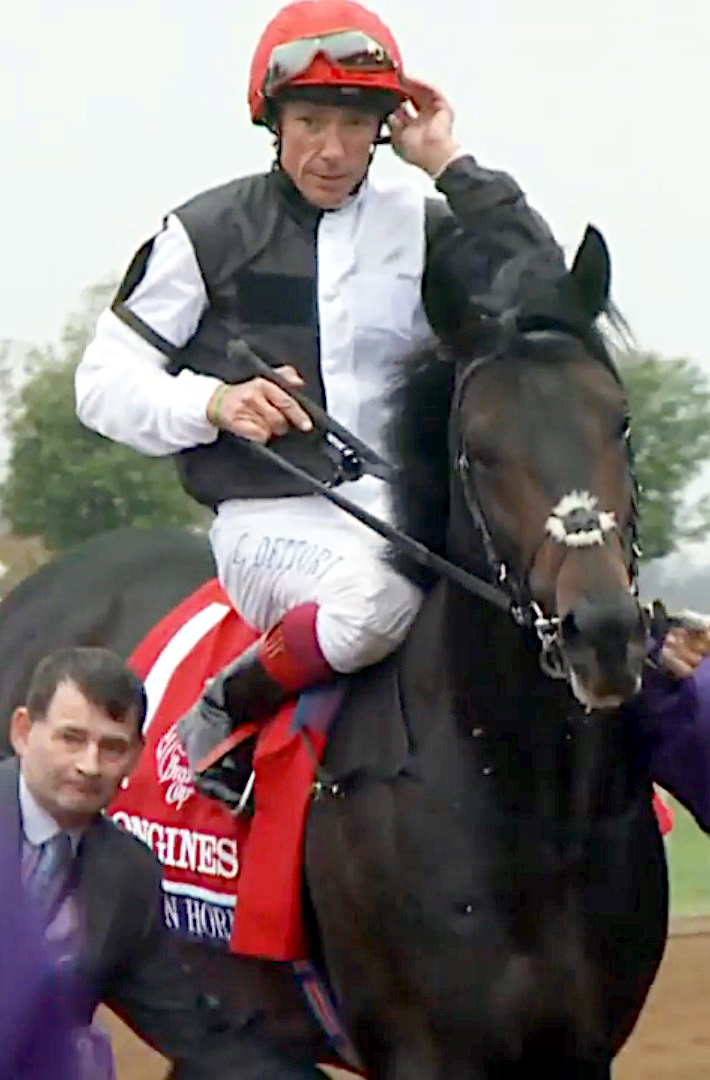
Frankie Dettori on Golden Horn, Breeders Cup Turf 2015

In the build-up to the race, there was some concern about the state of the turf course which had been softened by heavy rain, with the track supervisor saying that the ground was likely to be "good to soft" by British standards. Golden Horn was attempting to become the first Arc winner to win the race, following the failures of Dancing Brave (fourth in 1986), Trempolino (second in 1987), Saumarez, (fifth in 1990), Subotica (fifth in 1992) and Dylan Thomas (fifth in 2007).

In the Breeders' Cup Turf Golden Horn, the only one of the twelve horse field not running on Lasix, started odds-on favourite ahead of the other European challenger Found. The best of the ten American horses appeared to be The Pizza Man and Big Blue Kitten. The colt broke slowly but was settled behind the leaders as the outsider Shining Copper set the early pace. He moved into second place half a mile out and overtook the leader to gain the advantage approaching the final furlong. He was headed by Found in the closing stages, and although he rallied in the final strides he was beaten half a length by the filly. Gosden accepted the colt's defeat but felt he had been unable to produce his best on the soft ground, commenting "It was too loose for Golden Horn, but full marks to the filly for beating us fair and square... I said to everyone beforehand that after all the rain and three inches of it, it would be far from ideal... Frankie said he was spinning his wheels all the time" but added that "he appears to be bright after his race".

== Assessment and awards ==
In the June edition of the World's Best Racehorse Rankings, Golden Horn was rated the joint-second best racehorse in the world, three pounds behind American Pharoah and level with Shared Belief and Able Friend. After the Eclipse win the British Horseracing Authority's handicapper gave Golden Horn a rating of 130, a mark for a three-year-old equalled only by Frankel since 1996. The July edition of the World's Best Racehorse Rankings saw Golden Horn overtake American Pharoah to become the world's highest rated racehorse, but dropped back into second behind the American Triple Crown winner in August. In the end of year rankings he was rated the second-best racehorse in the world, four pounds behind American Pharoah: he was rated the best horse in Europe, the best horse on turf and the best horse in the long-distance division.

On 10 November 2015, Golden Horn was named Cartier Champion Three-year-old Colt and Cartier Horse of the Year at the 25th edition of the Cartier Racing Awards.

On 1 August 2018, during an interview on ITV Racing at Goodwood, Frankie Dettori declared Golden Horn as his favourite horse of all time.

== Racing statistics ==
Date	Race	Dist (f)	Course	Class	Prize (£K)	Odds	Ran	Place	Margin	Time	Jockey	Cite
29 Jul 2014	Oath Maiden Stakes	8.5	Nottingham	Maiden	6	15/8	8	1	Head	1:46.69	William Buick	
15 Apr 2015	Feilden Stakes	9	Newmarket	Listed	20	2/1	7	1	1.5	1:48.16	Frankie Dettori	
14 May 2015	Dante Stakes	10.5	York	2	90	4/1	7	1	2.75	2:08.74	William Buick	
6 Jun 2015	Epsom Derby	12	Epsom	1	813	13/8	12	1	3.5	2:32.32	Frankie Dettori	
4 Jul 2015	Eclipse Stakes	10	Sandown	1	255	4/9	5	1	3.5	2:05.77	Frankie Dettori	
19 Aug 2015	International Stakes	10.5	York	1	518	4/9	7	2	Neck	2:09.92	Frankie Dettori	
12 Sep 2015	Irish Champion Stakes	10	Leopardstown	1	494	5/4	7	1	1	2:05.41	Frankie Dettori	
4 Oct 2015	Prix de l'Arc de Triomphe	12	Longchamp	1	2214	9/2	17	1	2	2:27.23	Frankie Dettori	
31 Oct 2015	Breeders' Cup Turf	12	Keeneland	1	1057	4/6	12	2	0.5	2:32.06	Frankie Dettori	

== Stud career ==
Shortly after his victory in the Arc, it was announced that Golden Horn would be retired to stud at the end of the year and would stand as a breeding stallion at Dalham Hall in 2016 in a partnership between Oppenheimer and Sheikh Mohammed's Darley Stud.

In July 2022 Golden Horn was sold privately to Jayne McGivern of Dash Grange Stud. He is currently standing as a breeding stallion at Overbury Stud.

=== Notable progeny ===
c = colt, f = filly, g = gelding

Foaled	Name	Sex	Major wins
2018	Golden Ace	f	Champion Hurdle
2018	Trawlerman	g	Ascot Gold Cup, British Champions Long Distance Cup
2021	Poniros	g	Triumph Hurdle

== Pedigree ==
Pedigree of Golden Horn, brown colt, 2012
Sire Cape Cross (IRE) 1994	Green Desert (USA); 1983	Danzig	Northern Dancer
Sire Cape Cross (IRE) 1994	Green Desert (USA); 1983	Danzig	Pas De Nom
Sire Cape Cross (IRE) 1994	Green Desert (USA); 1983	Foreign Courier	Sir Ivor
Sire Cape Cross (IRE) 1994	Green Desert (USA); 1983	Foreign Courier	Courtly Dee
Sire Cape Cross (IRE) 1994	Park Appeal (IRE); 1982	Ahonoora	Lorenzaccio
Sire Cape Cross (IRE) 1994	Park Appeal (IRE); 1982	Ahonoora	Helen Nichols
Sire Cape Cross (IRE) 1994	Park Appeal (IRE); 1982	Balidaress	Balidar
Sire Cape Cross (IRE) 1994	Park Appeal (IRE); 1982	Balidaress	Innocence
Dam Fleche d'Or (GB) 2006	Dubai Destination (USA); 1999	Kingmambo	Mr. Prospector
Dam Fleche d'Or (GB) 2006	Dubai Destination (USA); 1999	Kingmambo	Miesque
Dam Fleche d'Or (GB) 2006	Dubai Destination (USA); 1999	Mysterial	Alleged
Dam Fleche d'Or (GB) 2006	Dubai Destination (USA); 1999	Mysterial	Mysteries
Dam Fleche d'Or (GB) 2006	Nuryana (GB); 1984	Nureyev	Northern Dancer
Dam Fleche d'Or (GB) 2006	Nuryana (GB); 1984	Nureyev	Special
Dam Fleche d'Or (GB) 2006	Nuryana (GB); 1984	Loralane	Habitat
Dam Fleche d'Or (GB) 2006	Nuryana (GB); 1984	Loralane	Lora (Family: 9-c)

- Golden Horn is inbred 4 × 4 to Northern Dancer, meaning that this stallion appears twice in the fourth generation of his pedigree.
