= John F Kennedy (horse) =

Irish Thoroughbred racehorse

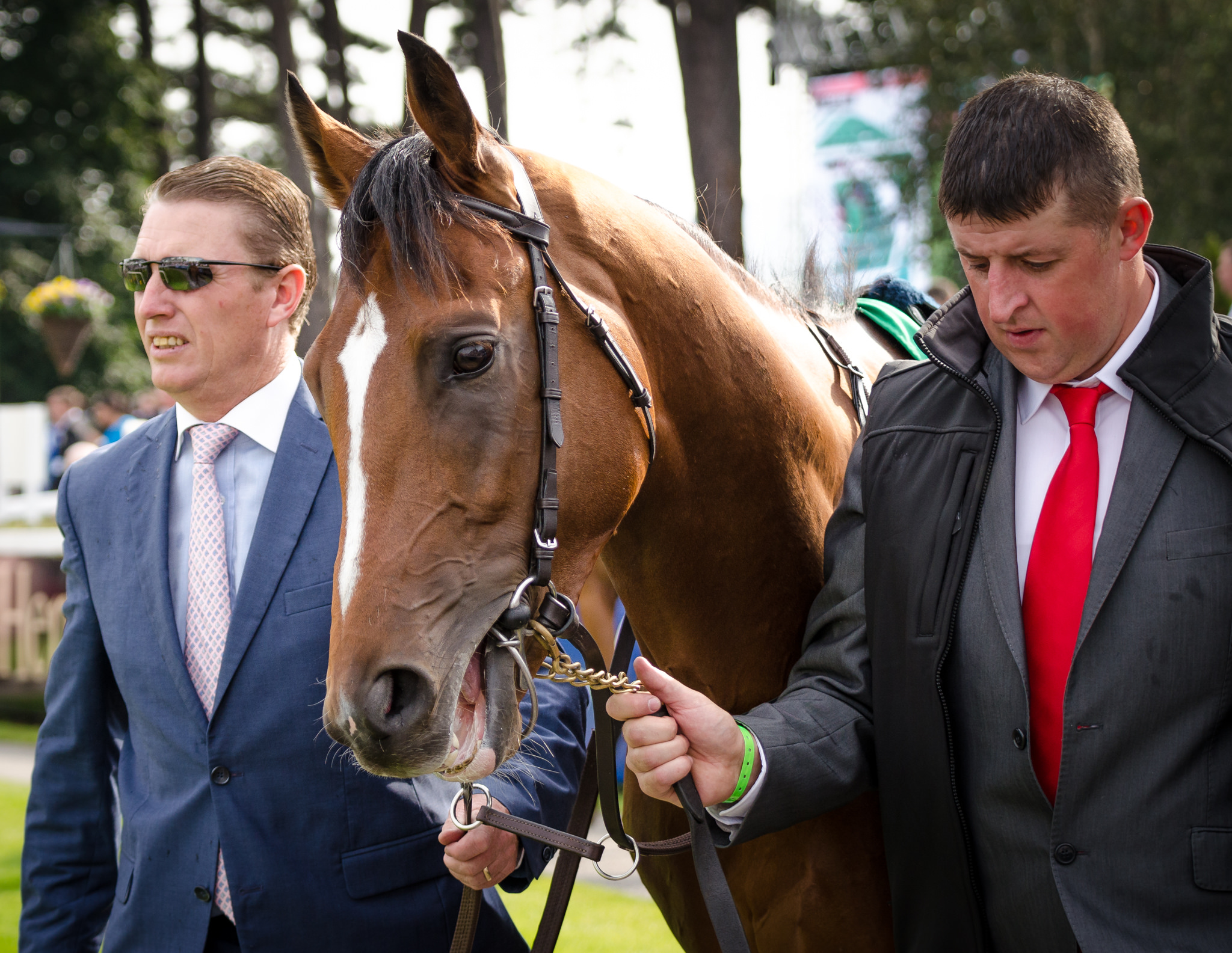
- John F Kennedy at Leopardstown
- Sire: Galileo
- Grandsire: Sadlers Wells
- Dam: Rumplestiltskin
- Damsire: Danehill
- Sex: Stallion
- Foaled: 7 February 2012
- Died: 27 January 2022 (aged 9)
- Country: Ireland
- Colour: Bay
- Breeder: Orpendale And Niarchos Family
- Owner: Sue Magnier, Michael Tabor, Niarchos Family (2014 - 2016); P. H. Lobo Inc. (2016)
- Trainer: Aidan O'Brien (2014 - 2016); Paolo H. Lobo (2016)
- Record: 7:2-1-2
- Earnings: US$112,887

Major wins
- Juvenile Turf Stakes (2014)

John F Kennedy (7 February 2012 - 27 January 2022) was an Irish-bred Thoroughbred racehorse and a stallion stood in Argentina. He was beaten as an odds on favourite on his debut but won his next two races, the latter being the Juvenile Turf Stakes that turned out to be the last win in his racing career. At the end of 2014 he had been one of the antepost favourites for the 2015 Epsom Derby, though he did not run in it after all.

== Background ==
John F Kennedy's sire was leading sire Galileo and his dam was a dual group 1 winning filly Rumplestiltskin. He was a full brother of Tapestry, the winner of the 2014 Yorkshire Oaks. He was bred from the highly successful Galileo Danehill cross which has produced horses including Frankel, Roderic O'Connor and Teofilo. He was named after the 35th President of the United States John F Kennedy.

== Racing career ==
=== 2014: two-year-old season ===
John F Kennedy's career began in a Maiden race over a Mile at Leopardstown Racecourse. He began odds on favourite but was beaten 2 and a half lengths by the Jim Bolger trained Hall of Fame under a ride by Joseph O'Brien. He won his next start at The Curragh by 4 and a half lengths. Despite an entry in the Racing Post Trophy, his final start of 2014 came back at Leopardstown in the Juvenile Turf Stakes which he won beating stablemate East India.

=== 2015: three-year-old season ===
In the early part of 2015, John F Kennedy maintained his position as antepost favourite for the Derby before making his seasonal debut in the Group 3 Ballysax Stakes at Leopardstown on 12 April. He started the 1/4 favourite but finished last of the three runners behind Success Days and Zafilani, beaten ten and a half lengths by the winner. On 14 May, he ran in the Group 2 Dante Stakes at York and finished last of the seven runners, beaten by Golden Horn. After the race, trainer Aidan O'Brien said that he would not field John F Kennedy in the Derby. On his horse being outpaced and not being in contention throughout the race, O'Brien said: "We're disappointed. There's obviously something amiss." He said he would give the horse a break for the time being.

John F Kennedy's next start was Group 3 KPMG Enterprise Stakes at Leopardstown on 12 September, where he was beaten by Fascinating Rock and finished third out of five runners.

=== 2016: four-year-old season ===
Before the 2016 season, John F Kennedy was purchased by an Argentine group of breeders and moved to California, U.S. He finished seventh out of eight runners in an allowance optional claiming race on 15 May at Santa Anita Park and retired to become a stallion in Argentina.

== Stud career ==
As of 2021, he was standing at Haras Abolengo in Buenos Aires, Argentina. His progeny includes Cool Day, who won the 2020 Gran Premio Carlos Pellegrini and the 2021 Gran Premio Copa de Oro.

John F Kennedy died on January 27, 2022, at Haras Abolengo due to an acute colic.

== Pedigree ==
Pedigree of John F Kennedy (IRE), 2012
Sire Galileo (IRE) 1998	Sadler's Wells (USA); 1981	Northern Dancer	Nearctic
Sire Galileo (IRE) 1998	Sadler's Wells (USA); 1981	Northern Dancer	Natalma
Sire Galileo (IRE) 1998	Sadler's Wells (USA); 1981	Fairy Bridge	Bold Reason
Sire Galileo (IRE) 1998	Sadler's Wells (USA); 1981	Fairy Bridge	Special
Sire Galileo (IRE) 1998	Urban Sea (USA) ch. 1989	Miswaki	Mr Prospector
Sire Galileo (IRE) 1998	Urban Sea (USA) ch. 1989	Miswaki	Hopespringseternal
Sire Galileo (IRE) 1998	Urban Sea (USA) ch. 1989	Allegretta	Lombard
Sire Galileo (IRE) 1998	Urban Sea (USA) ch. 1989	Allegretta	Anatevka
Dam Rumplestiltskin (IRE) 2003	Danehill (USA); 1986	Danzig	Northern Dancer
Dam Rumplestiltskin (IRE) 2003	Danehill (USA); 1986	Danzig	Pas de Nom
Dam Rumplestiltskin (IRE) 2003	Danehill (USA); 1986	Rayzana	His Majesty
Dam Rumplestiltskin (IRE) 2003	Danehill (USA); 1986	Rayzana	Spring Adieu
Dam Rumplestiltskin (IRE) 2003	Monevassia (USA); 1994	Mr Prospector	Raise A Native
Dam Rumplestiltskin (IRE) 2003	Monevassia (USA); 1994	Mr Prospector	Gold Digger
Dam Rumplestiltskin (IRE) 2003	Monevassia (USA); 1994	Miesque	Nureyev
Dam Rumplestiltskin (IRE) 2003	Monevassia (USA); 1994	Miesque	Pasadoble
