= Andrea Atzeni =

Italian-born jockey (born 1991)

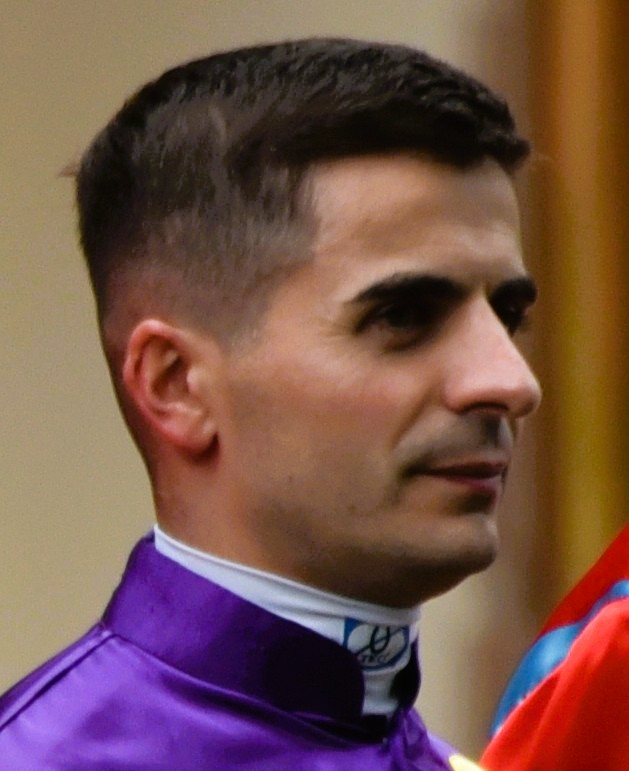
- Atzeni in February 2026

Personal information
- Born: 26 March 1991 (age 34) Sardinia, Italy
- Occupation: Jockey

Horse racing career
- Sport: Horse racing

Andrea Atzeni (born 26 March 1991) is a professional Italian jockey who was based in England for sixteen years before moving to Hong Kong. He was born on the Mediterranean island of Sardinia, where his father is a sheep farmer, and moved aged fifteen to Milan to work for Italian trainer Alduino Botti. Two years later he immigrated to England and joined the Prestige Place stables of Alduino's son Marco in Newmarket.

== Career ==
His first big success as a jockey came in the 2009 Cesarewitch Handicap, but he had to wait until 2012 for his first Group 1 win. This came on the Andreas Wöhler-trained Sortilege in the Premio Lydia Tesio ran at Capannelle Racecourse in Rome. Atzeni was appointed stable jockey to Roger Varian in 2013, and almost immediately won his first British Group 1 race aboard the Varian trained Kingston Hill in the Racing Post Trophy. He finished the season with 120 winners.

2014 brought further success for Atzeni, winning the St. Leger on Kingston Hill and the Moyglare Stud Stakes on Cursory Glance in the one weekend, followed by the Dewhurst Stakes on Belardo and the Racing Post Trophy on Elm Park the following month. Upon Jamie Spencer announcing his retirement (a decision he later revoked), Atzeni and Oisin Murphy were named joint jockeys to Qatar Racing owned by Sheikh Fahad al Thani. He finished the season with 125 winners.

In 2015, he won the King George VI and Queen Elizabeth Stakes on the Luca Cumani-trained Postponed. He finished first across the line in the St. Leger for the second successive year on Qatar Racing's filly Simple Verse. A subsequent stewards' enquiry saw Atzeni and Simple Verse demoted to second place for deemed interference with the second placed horse Bondi Beach. Qatar Racing successfully appealed against the stewards' decision, and Simple Verse reclaimed the race. In October Atzeni guided Simple Verse to her second Group 1 in the British Champions Fillies' and Mares' Stakes, prior to her being named European Champion Stayer at the prestigious Cartier Racing Award. At the end of the 2015 season he became retained rider to Sheikh Mohammed Obaid Al Maktoum, for whom had ridden Postponed to King George success, thus leaving his job at Qatar Racing. Sheikh Mohammed Obaid Al Maktoum withdrew his entire string from Luca Cumani's Bedford House Stables and moved them to Roger Varian's Kremlin House Stables. The partnership lasted until September 2022, with Atzeni riding 193 winners for the Emirati owner. After difficulty in finding good rides in his first season as a freelance, Atzeni took up the offer of a contract with the Hong Kong Jockey Club, starting in September 2023. During his sixteen-year career in Britain, he had won 26 Group 1 races.

== Major wins ==
Australia

- Sydney Cup – (1) – Circle of Fire (2024)

Canada

- Canadian International Stakes – (2) – Desert Encounter (2018, 2019)
- E.P. Taylor Stakes – (1) – Sheikha Reika (2018)

France

- Prix d'Ispahan – (1) – Zabeel Prince (2019)
- Prix Jean Romanet – (1) – Ajman Princess (2017)
- Prix Morny – (1) – Vandeek (2023)

Germany

- Grosser Preis von Bayern – (1) – Seismos (2013)

(United Kingdom) Great Britain

- British Champions Fillies' and Mares' Stakes – (1) – Simple Verse (2015)
- Coronation Cup – (2) – Postponed (2016), Defoe (2019)
- Dewhurst Stakes – (1) – Belardo (2014)
- Goodwood Cup – (2) – Stradivarius (2017, 2018)
- International Stakes – (1) – Postponed (2016)
- King George VI and Queen Elizabeth Stakes – (1) – Postponed (2015)
- Lockinge Stakes – (1) – Belardo (2016)
- Racing Post Trophy – (4) – Kingston Hill (2013), Elm Park (2014), Marcel (2015), Rivet (2016)
- St. Leger Stakes – (2) – Kingston Hill (2014), Simple Verse (2015)
- Haydock Sprint Cup – (1) – Emaraaty Ana (2021)

(Republic of Ireland) Ireland

- Irish Champion Stakes – (1) – Decorated Knight (2017)
- Moyglare Stud Stakes – (1) – Cursory Glance (2014)
- Pretty Polly Stakes – (1) – Nezwaah (2017)
- Tattersalls Gold Cup – (1) – Decorated Knight (2017)

Italy

- Premio Lydia Tesio – (1) – Sortilege (2012)

(United Arab Emirates) UAE

- Dubai Sheema Classic – (1) – Postponed (2016)
- Jebel Hatta – (1) – Decorated Knight (2017)
