= Simple Verse =

Irish-bred Thoroughbred racehorse

- Racing silks of Qatar Racing Limited
- Sire: Duke of Marmalade
- Grandsire: Danehill
- Dam: Guantanamera
- Damsire: Sadler's Wells
- Sex: Filly
- Foaled: 5 March 2012
- Country: Ireland
- Colour: Bay
- Breeder: Barronstown Stud
- Owner: QBL, Sheikh Suhaim Al Thani, M Al Kubaisi
- Trainer: Ralph Beckett
- Record: 15: 6-3-2
- Earnings: £965,615

Major wins
- Lillie Langtry Stakes (2015); St Leger Stakes (2015); British Champions Fillies' and Mares' Stakes (2015); Park Hill Stakes (2016)

Awards
- Cartier Champion Stayer (2015)

Simple Verse (foaled 5 March 2012) is an Irish Thoroughbred racehorse. Unraced as a juvenile, the filly quickly established herself as a top-class stayer by winning the St Leger Stakes. The previous filly to win the St Leger Stakes was User Friendly in 1992. She followed up her win in the St Leger with another Group One win in the British Champions Fillies' and Mares' Stakes the following month.

== Background ==
Simple Verse was bred by the Barronstown Stud and foaled in Ireland on 5 March 2012.

== Racing career ==
=== 2015: three-year-old season ===
Simple Verse began her racing career in a ten furlong maiden race on the synthetic Polytrack surface at Lingfield Park Racecourse in February and finished unplaced behind Atwix. She finished third in a similar event at Kempton Park Racecourse in March before recording her first success in a maiden at Lingfield on 8 April. Her debut on turf came in May when she carried 114 pounds in a handicap race at Goodwood Racecourse and finished second behind the odds-on favourite Endless Time. In June the filly carried 125 pounds and started a 14/1 outsider for a handicap at Salisbury Racecourse and won by a short head from the Mark Johnston-trained Polarisation. The filly was then moved up in class and distance to contest the Group Three Lillie Langtry Stakes over fourteen furlongs at Goodwood on 30 July. Starting at odds of 11/1 in a fourteen-runner field she took the lead a furlong out and won by one and a half lengths from Hidden Gold.

==== St. Leger Stakes ====
On 12 September Simple Verse competed in the 239th running of the St Leger at Doncaster Racecourse and was ridden by Andrea Atzeni. Bondi Beach and Storm The Stars started the 2/1 joint favourites. The other runners were the Ballyroan Stakes winner Fields of Athenry, Vengeur Masque from France and the outsiders Medrano and Proposed. Fields of Athenry set the pace from Storm The Stars and Simple Verse with Bondi Beach in fourth. As the field entered the straight, Bondi Beach began to make progress on the outside as Storm The Stars overhauled Fields of Athenry whilst Simple Verse appeared trapped on the inside rail. Entering the last quarter mile Bondi Beach was badly bumped when Atzeni switched the filly to the right. Simple Verse overtook Storm The Stars but Bondi Beach recovered his momentum and renewed his challenge only to be hampered for a second time when the filly hung to the right again in the final furlong. Simple Verse crossed the line a head in front of Bondi Beach, but after a lengthy stewards' inquiry the placings were reversed, and the race was awarded to Bondi Beach who would be recorded as the winner until completion of an inquiry by the Horseracing Authority 11 days after the race. Colm O'Donoghue, the rider of Bondi Beach, told the stewards "Has an incident occurred? Yes. Has it took me off a straight course? Yes... my horse has received a severe bump which has obviously taken his breath, knocked him off his stride and his rhythm... he's suffered interference and he's been beaten a head on the line". The demotion from first to second place was only the second in the St Leger's 239-year history with the first occurring in 1789 and also involving a filly, Pewett. The connections of Simple Verse lodged an appeal against the result, and the decision was reversed in favour of Simple Verse on 23 September after a hearing conducted by the British Horseracing Authority. Though happy with the reversal, trainer Ralph Beckett voiced displeasure with the affair, “It’s not quite the same. It’ll never be quite the same. To have it taken away on the day was horrendous at the time. It’s been a pretty miserable 11 days.”

On 10 November 2015, Simple Verse was named Cartier Champion Stayer at the 25th edition of the Cartier Racing Awards, narrowly beating the Ascot Gold Cup winner Trip To Paris.

=== 2016: four-year-old season ===
Simple Verse began her second season in the Group Two Jockey Club Stakes at Newmarket on 30 April. She took the lead two furlongs from the finish but was overtaken and beaten four lengths into second place by Exosphere. On 4 June the filly contested the Coronation Cup at Epsom and started 5/1 third favourite behind Postponed and Found. After being held up at the rear of the field she made steady progress in the straight without ever looking likely to win and finished fourth, seven and a half length behind the winner Postponed. In the Hardwicke Stakes at Royal Ascot in June she raced prominently before fading in the straight and finishing seventh of the nine runners behind the Queen's colt Dartmouth.

After a lengthy summer break Simple Verse returned to the scene of her St Leger victory when she contested the Group Two Park Hill Stakes on 8 September. She started the 3/1 second favourite behind the Galtres Stakes winner Abingdon in a twelve-runner field. Ridden as in all her races that year by Oisin Murphy she was restrained at the rear of the field before making progress in the straight. She overtook the Aidan O'Brien-trained Pretty Perfect in the final strides and won by a neck, with a gap of five lengths back to California in third. After the race Beckett said "It's great to get her back as it hasn't been easy. This is her optimum and possibly even two miles and I would be keen to go that way next time with the Long Distance Cup the obvious race for her".

On 15 October the filly was moved up in distance for the British Champions Long Distance Cup over two miles at Ascot. After racing in fourth she stayed on strongly in the straight without being able to reach the leaders and finished third behind Sheikhzayedroad and Quest For More, with the odds-on favourite Order of St George in fourth place.

== Pedigree ==
Pedigree of Simple Verse (IRE), bay filly, 2012
Sire Duke of Marmalade (IRE) 2004	Danehill (USA); 1986	Danzig	Northern Dancer
Sire Duke of Marmalade (IRE) 2004	Danehill (USA); 1986	Danzig	Pas de Nome
Sire Duke of Marmalade (IRE) 2004	Danehill (USA); 1986	Razyana	His Majesty
Sire Duke of Marmalade (IRE) 2004	Danehill (USA); 1986	Razyana	Spring Adieu
Sire Duke of Marmalade (IRE) 2004	Love Me True (USA); 1998	Kingmambo	Mr. Prospector
Sire Duke of Marmalade (IRE) 2004	Love Me True (USA); 1998	Kingmambo	Miesque
Sire Duke of Marmalade (IRE) 2004	Love Me True (USA); 1998	Lassie's Lady	Alydar
Sire Duke of Marmalade (IRE) 2004	Love Me True (USA); 1998	Lassie's Lady	Lassie Dear
Dam Guantanamera (IRE) 2004	Sadler's Wells (USA); 1981	Northern Dancer	Nearctic
Dam Guantanamera (IRE) 2004	Sadler's Wells (USA); 1981	Northern Dancer	Natalma
Dam Guantanamera (IRE) 2004	Sadler's Wells (USA); 1981	Fairy Bridge	Bold Reason
Dam Guantanamera (IRE) 2004	Sadler's Wells (USA); 1981	Fairy Bridge	Special
Dam Guantanamera (IRE) 2004	Bluffing (GB); 1992	Darshaan	Shirley Heights
Dam Guantanamera (IRE) 2004	Bluffing (GB); 1992	Darshaan	Delsy
Dam Guantanamera (IRE) 2004	Bluffing (GB); 1992	Instinctive Move	Nijinsky
Dam Guantanamera (IRE) 2004	Bluffing (GB); 1992	Instinctive Move	Bold Bikini (Family 5-e)

- Simple Verse is distantly inbred 3 × 4 to Northern Dancer.
