= Dante Stakes =

Flat horse race in Britain

- Class: Group 2
- Location: York Racecourse; York, England
- Inaugurated: 1958
- Race type: Flat / Thoroughbred
- Sponsor: Al Basti Equiworld
- Website: York

Race information
- Distance: 1m 2f 56y (2,063m)
- Surface: Turf
- Track: Left-handed
- Qualification: Three-year-olds
- Weight: 9 st 2 lb Allowances; 3 lb for fillies Penalties; 3 lb for G1 win this year
- Purse: £192,200 (2025); 1st: £108,997

Dante Stakes
2026
Item	Action	Christmas Day

Previous years
2025
Pride Of Arras	Damysus	Wimbledon Hawkeye
2024
Economics	Ancient Wisdom	War Rooms
2023
The Foxes	White Birch	Continuous
2022
Desert Crown	Royal Patronage	Bluegrass
2021
Hurricane Lane	Megallan	High Definition

2020-2011
2020
Thunderous	Highest Ground	Juan Elcano
2019
Telecaster	Too Darn Hot	Surfman
2018
Roaring Lion	Mildenberger	Zabriskie
2017
Permian	Benbatl	Crystal Ocean
2016
Wings of Desire	Deauville	Foundation
2015
Golden Horn	Jack Hobbs	Elm Park
2014
The Grey Gatsby	Arod	True Story
2013
Libertarian	Trading Leather	Indian Chief
2012
Bonfire	Ektihaam	Fencing
2011
Carlton House	Seville	Pisco Sour

2010-2001
2010
Cape Blanco	Workforce	Coordinated Cut
2009
Black Bear Island	Freemantle	Sans Frontieres
2008
Tartan Bearer	Frozen Fire	Twice Over
2007
Authorized	Raincoat	Al Shemali
2006
Septimus	Best Alibi	Snoqualmie Boy
2005
Motivator	The Geezer	Falstaff
2004
North Light	Rule of Law	Let The Lion Roar
2003
Magistretti	Tuning Fork	Dunhill Star
2002
Moon Ballad	Bollin Eric	Balakheri
2001
Dilshaan	Celtic Silence	Storming Home

2000-1991
2000
Sakhee	Pawn Broker	Best of the Bests
1999
Salford Express	Golden Snake	Slip Stream
1998
Saratoga Springs	City Honours	Border Arrow
1997
Benny The Dip	Desert Story	Musalsal
1996
Glory of Dancer	Dushyantor	Jack Jennings
1995
Classic Cliche	Annus Mirabilis	Presenting
1994
Erhaab	Weigh Anchor	Mister Baileys
1993
Tenby	Planetary Aspect	Shaiba
1992
Alnasr Alwasheek	Great Palm	Aljadeer
1991
Environment Friend	Hailsham	Perpendicular

1990-1981
1990
Sanglamore	Karinga Bay	Anshan
1989
Torjoun	Observation Post	Zalazl
1988
Red Glow	Kefaah	Glacial Storm
1987
Reference Point	Ascot Knight	Persifleur
1986
Shahrastani	Nomrood	Sirk
1985
Damister	Vin de France	Reach
1984
Claud Monet	Hatim	Head for Heights
1983
Hot Touch	Guns of Navarone	Dunbeath
1982
Simply Great	Palace Gold	Be My Native
1981
Beldale Flutter	Shotgun	Scintillating Air

1980-1976
1980
Hello Gorgeous	Master Willie	Water Mill
1979
Lyphard's Wish	Hardgreen	Lake City
1978
Shirley Heights	Julio Mariner	Sexton Blake
1977
Lucky Sovereign	Baudelaire	Milverton
1976
Trasi's Son	Gunner B	Dutch Treat

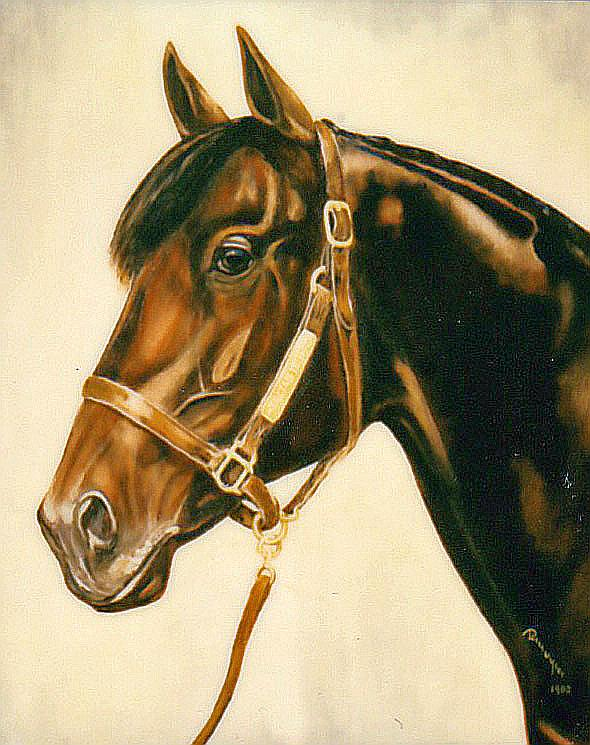
Shirley Heights, by Bob Demuyser (1920–2003)

The Dante Stakes is a Group 2 flat horse race in Great Britain open to three-year-old horses. It is run over a distance of 1 mile, 2 furlongs and 56 yards (2,063 metres) at York in May.

== History ==
The event is named after Dante, the Yorkshire-trained winner of the Derby substitute at Newmarket in 1945. Established in 1958, it serves as a major trial for the Derby. The first running was won by Bald Eagle.

The present race grading system was introduced in 1971, and the Dante Stakes initially held Group 3 status. It was promoted to Group 2 level in 1980.

In total, eleven winners of the race have won the Derby. The first was St Paddy in 1960, and the most recent was Desert Crown in 2022. The most recent participant to win the Derby was Christmas Day, who placed third in the Dante Stakes in 2026. The 2014 Dante Stakes winner, The Grey Gatsby, subsequently won France's equivalent of the Derby, the Prix du Jockey-Club while the 2015 runner-up, Jack Hobbs, and 2021 winner Hurricane Lane, both won the Irish Derby.

The Dante Stakes is currently staged on the second day of York's three-day Dante Festival meeting.

== Records ==
Leading jockey (6 wins):

- Pat Eddery – Beldale Flutter (1981), Hot Touch (1983), Damister (1985), Red Glow (1988), Sanglamore (1990), Tenby (1993)

Leading trainer (7 wins):

- Sir Henry Cecil – Approval (1970), Lyphard's Wish (1979), Hello Gorgeous (1980), Simply Great (1982), Claude Monet (1984), Reference Point (1987), Tenby (1993)
- Sir Michael Stoute - Shahrastani (1986), Alnasr Alwasheek (1992), Dilshaan (2001), North Light (2004), Tartan Bearer (2008), Carlton House (2011), Desert Crown (2022)

== Winners ==
Year	Winner	Jockey	Trainer	Time
1958	Bald Eagle	Harry Carr	Cecil Boyd-Rochfort	2:23.80
1959	Dickens	Harry Carr	Cecil Boyd-Rochfort	2:12.60
1960	St Paddy	Lester Piggott	Noel Murless	2:14.80
1961	Gallant Knight	Eph Smith	Ted Leader	2:24.20
1962	Lucky Brief	Brian Connorton	Snowy Gray	2:17.40
1963	Merchant Venturer	Greville Starkey	John Oxley	2:18.40
1964	Sweet Moss	Lester Piggott	Noel Murless	2:11.20
1965	Ballymarais	Bill Pyers	Snowy Gray	2:23.60
1966	Hermes	Greville Starkey	John Oxley	2:21.20
1967	Gay Garland	Ron Hutchinson	Harry Wragg	2:25.60
1968	Lucky Finish	Brian Taylor	Harvey Leader	2:20.60
1969	Activator	Taffy Thomas	Geoffrey Barling	2:37.60
1970	Approval	Greville Starkey	Henry Cecil	2:11.40
1971	Fair World	Jimmy Lindley	George Todd	2:11.00
1972	Rheingold	Ernie Johnson	Barry Hills	2:09.25
1973	Owen Dudley	Geoff Lewis	Noel Murless	2:10.70
1974	Honoured Guest	Geoff Lewis	Noel Murless	2:09.32
1975	Hobnob	Willie Carson	Harry Wragg	2:17.83
1976	Trasi's Son	Edward Hide	Martin Tate	2:18.13
1977	Lucky Sovereign	Taffy Thomas	Harry Wragg	2:16.69
1978	Shirley Heights	Greville Starkey	John Dunlop	2:10.84
1979	Lyphard's Wish	Joe Mercer	Henry Cecil	2:10.20
1980	Hello Gorgeous	Joe Mercer	Henry Cecil	2:10.14
1981	Beldale Flutter	Pat Eddery	Michael Jarvis	2:19.05
1982	Simply Great	Lester Piggott	Henry Cecil	2:12.12
1983	Hot Touch	Pat Eddery	Geoff Wragg	2:19.11
1984	Claude Monet	Steve Cauthen	Henry Cecil	2:08.55
1985	Damister	Pat Eddery	Jeremy Tree	2:17.23
1986	Shahrastani	Walter Swinburn	Michael Stoute	2:11.72
1987	Reference Point	Steve Cauthen	Henry Cecil	2:08.25
1988	Red Glow	Pat Eddery	Geoff Wragg	2:11.95
1989	Torjoun	Ray Cochrane	Luca Cumani	2:06.98
1990	Sanglamore	Pat Eddery	Roger Charlton	2:09.18
1991	Environment Friend	George Duffield	James Fanshawe	2:12.42
1992	Alnasr Alwasheek	Steve Cauthen	Michael Stoute	2:08.71
1993	Tenby	Pat Eddery	Henry Cecil	2:12.36
1994	Erhaab	Willie Carson	John Dunlop	2:06.18
1995	Classic Cliche	Walter Swinburn	Saeed bin Suroor	2:10.63
1996	Glory of Dancer	Olivier Peslier	Paul Kelleway	2:12.40
1997	Benny the Dip	Olivier Peslier	John Gosden	2:11.97
1998	Saratoga Springs	Michael Kinane	Aidan O'Brien	2:11.57
1999	Salford Express	Richard Quinn	David Elsworth	2:16.36
2000	Sakhee	Richard Hills	John Dunlop	2:07.81
2001	Dilshaan	Kieren Fallon	Sir Michael Stoute	2:10.69
2002	Moon Ballad	Jamie Spencer	Saeed bin Suroor	2:07.06
2003	Magistretti	Kevin Darley	Neville Callaghan	2:09.48
2004	North Light	Kieren Fallon	Sir Michael Stoute	2:15.69
2005	Motivator	Johnny Murtagh	Michael Bell	2:16.17
2006	Septimus	Kieren Fallon	Aidan O'Brien	2:17.55
2007	Authorized	Frankie Dettori	Peter Chapple-Hyam	2:11.54
2008	Tartan Bearer	Ryan Moore	Sir Michael Stoute	2:09.50
2009	Black Bear Island	Colm O'Donoghue	Aidan O'Brien	2:11.64
2010	Cape Blanco	Johnny Murtagh	Aidan O'Brien	2:06.70
2011	Carlton House	Ryan Moore	Sir Michael Stoute	2:13.49
2012	Bonfire	Jimmy Fortune	Andrew Balding	2:10.52
2013	Libertarian	William Buick	Elaine Burke	2:10.59
2014	The Grey Gatsby	Ryan Moore	Kevin Ryan	2:08.99
2015	Golden Horn	William Buick	John Gosden	2:08.74
2016	Wings of Desire	Frankie Dettori	John Gosden	2:07.37
2017	Permian	Franny Norton	Mark Johnston	2:08.40
2018	Roaring Lion	Oisin Murphy	John Gosden	2:09.79
2019	Telecaster	Oisin Murphy	Hughie Morrison	2:10.24
2020 (Note: The 2020 race was run in July due to the COVID-19 pandemic in the United Kingdom)	Thunderous	Franny Norton	Mark Johnston	2:08.62
2021	Hurricane Lane	William Buick	Charlie Appleby	2:10.06
2022	Desert Crown	Richard Kingscote	Sir Michael Stoute	2:09.46
2023	The Foxes	Oisin Murphy	Andrew Balding	2:05.84
2024	Economics	Tom Marquand	William Haggas	2:09.30
2025	Pride Of Arras	Rossa Ryan	Ralph Beckett	2:11.56
2026	Item	Colin Keane	Andrew Balding	2:10.80

== See also ==
- Horse racing in Great Britain
- List of British flat horse races
