= Benny the Dip =

American-bred Thoroughbred racehorse

- Racing colours of Landon Knight
- Sire: Silver Hawk
- Grandsire: Roberto
- Dam: Rascal Rascal
- Damsire: Ack Ack
- Sex: Stallion
- Foaled: 1994
- Country: United States
- Colour: Bay/Brown
- Breeder: Charles Landon Knight II
- Owner: Charles Landon Knight II & Claiborne Farm
- Trainer: John Gosden
- Record: 11: 5-3-2
- Earnings: £876,267

Major wins
- Royal Lodge Stakes (1996); Epsom Derby (1997); Dante Stakes (1997)
- Last updated on August 25, 2007

Benny the Dip (1994–2003) was an American-bred and British-trained Thoroughbred race horse and sire. In a career which lasted from 1996 to 1997 he ran eleven times and won five races, most notably the 1997 Epsom Derby. Benny the Dip was retired to stud at the end of his three-year-old season. He died after sustaining an injury in a paddock accident in 2003.

== Background ==
Benny the Dip was a dark brown (officially "bay or brown") colt with a white star, bred in the United States by Landon Knight who raced the colt in his own colours until August 1997 when he sold a share in the colt to Claiborne Farm. The colt was sired by Silver Hawk out of the mare Rascal Rascal. Silver Hawk was an American-bred son of Roberto who raced successfully in the United Kingdom before moving back to the United States where he became a "very good" stallion, siring good winners such as the St Leger winner Mutafaweq, the Arc de Triomphe runner-up Mubtaker and the leading American turf runner Hawkster. Rascal Rascal produced several other winners including Cryptic Rascal (Palm Beach Stakes) and Beggarman Thief (Horris Hill Stakes), as well as Wakia, who foaled Silence Suzuka.

Benny the Dip was widely, but incorrectly reported to be named after a Damon Runyon character. In fact he was named after a 1951 crime film. He acquired the unflattering nickname "Benny the Drip" because of his tendency to sweat heavily before his races.

Knight, a newspaper publisher from Ohio (the son of John S. Knight), considered selling the colt as a yearling but was persuaded by his English trainer John Gosden to send the colt to him to be trained at Newmarket, Suffolk.

== Racing career ==
=== 1996: two-year-old season ===
Benny the Dip was one of the best staying two-year-old colts of his generation in Britain, winning three of his five starts. He began his career in June when he finished second of the nine runners behind Putra in a seven furlong maiden race at Sandown. Two weeks later he reappeared in a similar race at Newmarket and led from the start to record his first win, beating Sturgeon by two and a half lengths.

Benny the Dip did not run again until mid September, when he ran in a minor stakes race at Doncaster. Ridden by Frankie Dettori, he tracked the leaders before taking the lead a furlong out and winning by one and a half lengths from Desert Story. At the end of the month, Benny the Dip was moved up in class to run in the Group Two Royal Lodge Stakes at Ascot for which he was made 9/4 favourite. Ridden on this occasion by Walter Swinburn, he ran on strongly in the closing stages to again defeat Desert Story, this time by three-quarters of a length, with the future Group One winners Medaaly and Air Express unplaced. On his final start of the year, Benny the Dip was made 11/10 favourite for the Group One Racing Post Trophy at Doncaster, but could finish only third behind Medaaly and Poteen.

=== 1997: three-year-old season ===
Benny the Dip was prepared for the 1997 Derby by running in two recognised trial races. On 26 April he started favourite for the Classic Trial Stakes at Sandown and finished second, failing to concede two pounds to Voyager's Quest, with Silver Patriarch a head behind in third. After the race he appeared to be a sick horse; Gosden said that he was coughing and "full of mucus". He recovered quickly however, and in May he led from the start in the Dante Stakes at York confirming his best two-year-old form by beating Desert Story by two and a half lengths with Medaaly unplaced. Richard Edmondson, writing in The Independent described the win as "fluent", while Gosden explained the tactics by saying that "we went out there to see if he could stay and he outstayed them."

At Epsom on 7 June Benny the Dip, started the 11/1 third favourite in a field of thirteen for the Derby. He was ridden in the race by Willie Ryan, a journeyman jockey who had been given the ride when both Olivier Peslier, who had ridden him at York, and Frankie Dettori, were unavailable. The 2000 Guineas winner Entrepreneur was made odds-on favourite, while Silver Patriarch, ridden by the veteran Pat Eddery was the 6/1 second choice. Ryan tracked the leaders before sending Benny the Dip past Crystal Hearted and into the lead half a mile from the finish. In the straight, Benny the Dip went six lengths clear of his rivals two furlongs from the finish, but was then strongly challenged in the closing stages by Silver Patriarch. The grey colt appeared to catch the leader a few yards from the finish, but Benny the Dip produced a final effort ("he dug deep", commented Ryan) and the two colts crossed the line together. After a delay, the result of the photo finish revealed that Benny the Dip had held on to win the race by a short head.

For his next race, Benny the Dip was brought back to ten furlongs for the Eclipse Stakes at Sandown, in which he faced top class older horses. Once again, Ryan attempted to make all the running. On this occasion however, he was overtaken two furlongs out by the five-year-old Pilsudski, but stayed on well to hold on to second place from the filly Bosra Sham, who had started odds-on favourite. Although he was beaten, the form of his run was rather better than his Derby win: a Timeform handicapper had said before the race that Benny the Dip would be doing well if he got "within five lengths" of Bosra Sham. Benny the Dip again took on the best available competition in his next race, the International Stakes at York. As usual, he made most of the running before finishing third behind Singspiel and Desert King.

On his final start, Benny the Dip disappointed in the Champion Stakes at Newmarket in October. He led briefly three furlongs from the finish, but then faded into sixth place behind Pilsudski. It had already been announced that Benny the Dip would not race as a four-year-old and would be retired to stand at stud in North America.

=== Assessment ===
In their book A Century of Champions, John Randall and Tony Morris rated Benny the Dip as an "inferior" Derby winner.

== Stud record ==
He retired to stud in 1998 and stood at Claiborne Farm, at Paris, Kentucky, until 2001 when he began serving at Cheveley Park Stud in Newmarket. He was sold and moved to Rathbarry Stud, County Cork, Ireland in 2003 but was euthanised two weeks after arrival after fracturing a knee in the paddock. Benny the Dip made very little impact as a stallion. He produced no top class horses, with the best of his flat runners being the Group placed Charley Bates and the Irish Listed race winner Senor Benny. Some of his progeny have shown ability over jumps, notably the steeplechaser Benny Be Good. His stud fee at the time of his death was £6,000.

== Pedigree ==
Pedigree of Benny the Dip (USA), brown stallion, 1994
Sire Silver Hawk (USA) 1979	Roberto; 1969	Hail to Reason	Turn-To*
Sire Silver Hawk (USA) 1979	Roberto; 1969	Hail to Reason	Nothirdchance
Sire Silver Hawk (USA) 1979	Roberto; 1969	Bramalea	Nashua
Sire Silver Hawk (USA) 1979	Roberto; 1969	Bramalea	Rarelea
Sire Silver Hawk (USA) 1979	Gris Vitesse; 1966	Amerigo	Nearco
Sire Silver Hawk (USA) 1979	Gris Vitesse; 1966	Amerigo	Saninlea
Sire Silver Hawk (USA) 1979	Gris Vitesse; 1966	Matchiche	Mat de Cocagne
Sire Silver Hawk (USA) 1979	Gris Vitesse; 1966	Matchiche	Chimere Fabuleuse
Dam Rascal Rascal (USA) 1981	Ack Ack; 1966	Battle Joined	Armageddon
Dam Rascal Rascal (USA) 1981	Ack Ack; 1966	Battle Joined	Ethel Walker
Dam Rascal Rascal (USA) 1981	Ack Ack; 1966	Fast Turn	Turn-To*
Dam Rascal Rascal (USA) 1981	Ack Ack; 1966	Fast Turn	Cherokee Rose
Dam Rascal Rascal (USA) 1981	Savage Bunny; 1974	Never Bend	Nasrullah
Dam Rascal Rascal (USA) 1981	Savage Bunny; 1974	Never Bend	Lalun
Dam Rascal Rascal (USA) 1981	Savage Bunny; 1974	Tudor Jet	Tudor Minstrel
Dam Rascal Rascal (USA) 1981	Savage Bunny; 1974	Tudor Jet	Precious Lady(Family: 9)

- Benny the Dip was inbred 4x4 to Turn-To. This means that the stallion appears twice in the fourth generation of his pedigree.
