= Irish Triple Crown race winners =

The Irish Triple Crown Winners is a three-race competition for Thoroughbred racehorses.

The Irish Triple Crown consists of the Irish 2,000 Guineas (at 1 mile), the Irish Derby (at about 1½ miles), and the Irish St. Leger (at 1 mile and 6 furlongs).

Runners who have won all three races in one year are in bold.

== Winners ==
**Year**	**Irish 2,000 Guineas**	**Irish Derby**	**Irish St. Leger**
2026	Gstaad	Benvenuto Cellini	Scandinavia
2025	Field Of Gold	Lambourn	Al Riffa
2024	Rosallion	Los Angeles	Kyprios
2023	Paddington	Auguste Rodin	Eldar Eldarov
2022	Native Trail	Westover	Kyprios
2021	Mac Swiney	Hurricane Lane	Sonnyboyliston
2020	Siskin	Santiago	Search For A Song
2019	Phoenix of Spain	Sovereign	Search For A Song
2018	Romanised	Latrobe	Flag of Honour
2017	Churchill	Capri	Order of St George
2016	Awtaad	Harzand	Wicklow Brave
2015	Gleneagles	Jack Hobbs	Order of St George
2014	Kingman	Australia	Brown Panther
2013	Magician	Trading Leather	Voleuse de Coeurs
2012	Power	Camelot	Royal Diamond
2011	Roderic O'Connor	Treasure Beach	Duncan / Jukebox Jury ^{1}
2010	Canford Cliffs	Cape Blanco	Sans Frontieres
2009	Mastercraftsman	Fame and Glory	Alandi
2008	Henrythenavigator	Frozen Fire	Septimus
2007	Cockney Rebel	Soldier of Fortune	Yeats
2006	Araafa	Dylan Thomas	Kastoria
2005	Dubawi	Hurricane Run	Collier Hill
2004	Bachelor Duke	Grey Swallow	Vinnie Roe
2003	Indian Haven	Alamshar	Vinnie Roe
2002	Rock of Gibraltar	High Chaparral	Vinnie Roe
2001	Black Minnaloushe	Galileo	Vinnie Roe
2000	Bachir	Sinndar	Arctic Owl
1999	Saffron Walden	Montjeu	Kayf Tara
1998	Desert Prince	Dream Well	Kayf Tara
1997	Desert King	Desert King	Oscar Schindler
1996	Spinning World	Zagreb	Oscar Schindler
1995	Spectrum	Winged Love	Strategic Choice
1994	Turtle Island	Balanchine	Vintage Crop
1993	Barathea	Commander in Chief	Vintage Crop
1992	Rodrigo de Triano	St Jovite	Mashaallah
1991	Fourstars Allstar	Generous	Turgeon
1990	Tirol	Salsabil	Ibn Bey
1989	Shaadi	Old Vic	Petite Ile
1988	Prince of Birds	Kahyasi	Dark Lomond
1987	Don't Forget Me	Sir Harry Lewis	Eurobird
1986	Flash of Steel	Shahrastani	Authaal
1985	Triptych	Law Society	Leading Counsel
1984	Sadler's Wells	El Gran Senor	Opale
1983	Wassl	Shareef Dancer	Mountain Lodge
1982	Dara Monarch	Assert	Touching Wood
1981	Kings Lake	Shergar	Protection Racket
1980	Nikoli	Tyrnavos	Gonzales
1979	Dickens Hill	Troy	Niniski
1978	Jaazeiro	Shirley Heights	M-Lolshan
1977	Pampapaul	The Minstrel	Transworld
1976	Northern Treasure	Malacate	Meneval
1975	Grundy	Grundy	Caucasus
1974	Furry Glen	English Prince	Mistigri
1973	Sharp Edge	Weavers' Hall	Conor Pass
1972	Ballymore	Steel Pulse	Pidget
1971	King's Company	Irish Ball	Parnell
1970	Decies	Nijinsky	Allangrange
1969	Right Tack	Prince Regent	Reindeer
1968	Mistigo	Ribero	Giolla Mear
1967	Atherstone Wood ^{2}	Ribocco	Dan Kano
1966	Paveh	Sodium	White Gloves
1965	Green Banner	Meadow Court	Craighouse
1964	Santa Claus	Santa Claus	Biscayne
1963	Linacre	Ragusa	Christmas Island
1962	Arctic Storm	Tambourine	Arctic Vale
1961	Light Year	Your Highness	Vimadee
1960	Kythnos	Chamour	Lynchris
1959	El Toro	Fidalgo	Barclay
1958	Hard Ridden	Sindon	Royal Highway
1957	Jack Ketch	Ballymoss	Ommeyad
1956	Lucero	Talgo	Magnetic North
1955	Hugh Lupus	Panaslipper	Diamond Slipper
1954	Arctic Wind	Zarathustra	Zarathustra
1953	Sea Charger	Chamier ^{3}	Sea Charger
1952	D C M	Thirteen of Diamonds	Judicate
1951	Signal Box	Fraise du Bois II	Do Well
1950	Mighty Ocean	Dark Warrior	Morning Madam
1949	Solonaway	Hindostan	Brown Rover
1948	Beau Sabreur	Nathoo	Beau Sabreur
1947	Grand Weather	Sayajirao	Esprit de France
1946	Claro	Bright News	Cassock
1945	Stalino	Piccadilly	Spam
1944	Good Morning / Slide On ^{4}	Slide On	Water Street
1943	The Phoenix	The Phoenix	Solferino
1942	**Windsor Slipper**	**Windsor Slipper**	**Windsor Slipper**
1941	Khosro	Sol Oriens	Etoile de Lyons
1940	Teasel	Turkhan	Harvest Feast
1939	Cornfield	Mondragon	Skoiter
1938	Nearchus	Rosewell	Ochiltree
1937	Phideas	Phideas	Owenstown
1936	Hocus Pocus	Raeburn	Battle Song
1935	**Museum**	**Museum**	**Museum**
1934	Cariff	Patriot King / Primero ^{5}	Primero
1933	Canteener	Harinero	Harinero
1932	Lindley	Dastur	Hill Song
1931	Double Arch	Sea Serpent	Beaudelaire
1930	Glannarg	Rock Star	Sol de Terre
1929	Salisbury	Kopi	Trigo
1928	Baytown	Baytown	Law Suit
1927	Fourth Hand	Knight of the Grail	Ballyvoy
1926	Embargo	Embargo	Sunny View
1925	St Donagh	Zionist	Spelthorne
1924	Grand Joy	Haine / Zodiac ^{6}	Zodiac
1923	Soldumeno	Waygood	O'Dempsey
1922	Spike Island	Spike Island	Royal Lancer
1921	Soldennis	Ballyheron	Kircubbin
1920		He Goes	Kirk-Alloway
1919		Loch Lomond	Cheap Popularity
1918		King John	Dionysos
1917		First Flier	Double Scotch
1916		Furore	Captive Princess
1915		Ballaghtobin	La Paloma
1914		Land of Song
1913		Bachelor's Wedding
1912		Civility
1911		Shanballymore
1910		Aviator
1909		Bachelor's Double
1908		Wild Bouquet
1907		Orby
1906		Killeagh
1905		Flax Park
1904		Royal Arch
1903		Lord Rossmore
1902		St Brendan
1901		Carrigavalla
1900		Gallinaria
1899		Oppressor
1898		Noble Howard
1897		Wales
1896		Gulsalberk
1895		Portmarnock
1894		Blairfinde
1893		Bowline
1892		Roy Neil
1891		Narraghmore
1890		Kentish Fire
1889		Tragedy
1888		Theodolite
1887		Pet Fox
1886		Theodemir
1885		St Kevin
1884		Theologian
1883		Sylph
1882		Sortie
1881		Master Ned
1880		King of the Bees
1879		Soulouque
1878		Madame du Barry
1877		Redskin
1876		Umpire
1875		Innishowen
1874		Ben Battle
1873		Kyrle Daly
1872		Trickstress
1871		Maid of Athens
1870		Billy Pitt
1869		The Scout
1868		Madeira
1867		Golden Plover
1866		Selim

^{1} 2011 race was a dead-heat with joint winners.
^{2} 1967 race Kingfisher finished first, but was relegated to second place upon an inquiry afterwards.
^{3} 1953 race Premonition finished first, but was disqualified.
^{4} 1944 race was a dead-heat with joint winners.
^{5} 1934 race was a dead-heat with joint winners.
^{6} 1924 race was a dead-heat with joint winners.

== Bibliography ==
- The History of the Thoroughbred, 1978.
