= Vintage Crop Stakes =

Flat horse race in Ireland

- Class: Listed
- Location: Navan Racecourse; County Meath, Ireland
- Race type: Flat / Thoroughbred
- Website: Navan

Race information
- Distance: 1m 6f (2,816 metres)
- Surface: Turf
- Track: Left-handed
- Qualification: Four-years-old and up
- Weight: 9 st 5 lb (4yo); 9 st 6 lb (5yo+); Allowances; 3 lb for fillies and mares Penalties; 5 lb for G1 / G2 winners * 3 lb for G3 winners * * of a race 11 furlongs or more since 1 May last year
- Purse: €47,000 (2022); 1st: €29,500

Vintage Crop Stakes
2026
Scandinavia	Dallas Star	Emit

Previous years
2025
Kyprios	Enfranchise	Poetic Sound
2024
Kyprios	Queenstown	Yashin
2023
Emily Dickinson	French Claim	Bolshoi Ballet
2022
Kyprios	Search For A Song	Baron Samedi
2021
Baron Samedi	Master Of Reality	Emperor Of The Sun

2020-2011
2020
Twilight Payment	Barbados	Sovereign
2019
Master Of Reality	Mustajeer	Southern France
2018
Order Of St George	Lord Yeats	Clongowes
2017
Torcedor	Order Of St George	Twilight Payment
2016
Bondi Beach	Toe The Line	Silwana
2015
Forgotten Rules	Answered	Sir Ector
2014
Leading Light	Royal Diamond	Pale Mimosa
2013
Voleuse De Coeurs	Missunited	El Salvador
2012
Fame And Glory	Unaccompanied	Steps To Freedom
2011
Fame And Glory	Nebula Storm	Fictional Account

2010-2003
2010
Roses For The Lady	Merchant Of Dubai	Grace O'malley
2009
Alandi	Hindu Kush	The Betchworth Kid
2008
Yeats	Red Moloney	Alfie Flits
2007
Yeats	Reform Act	Cool Touch
2006
Kastoria	Virginia Woolf	Valentina Guest
2005
Icklingham	Swiss Roll	Solerina
2004
Jade Quest	Maharib	Icklingham
2003
Holy Orders	Crimphill	Really

The Vintage Crop Stakes is a Listed flat horse race in Ireland open to thoroughbreds aged four years or older. It is run at Navan over a distance of 1 mile and 6 furlongs (2,816 metres), and it is scheduled to take place each year in April.

The race was first run, as a Listed race, in 2003. It was upgraded to Group Three status from 2014. The race was a furlong shorter until 2011.

The race is named after Vintage Crop, an Irish-trained racehorse of the 1990s who won the Irish St. Leger twice and became the first European runner to win the Melbourne Cup, in 1993.

From 2022, the Vintage Crop Stakes downgraded to listed race while reforming Irish staying races in early season.

== Records ==
Most successful horse (3 wins):

- Kyprios - 2022, 2024, 2025

Leading jockey (6 wins):

- Ryan Moore - Order of St George (2018), Kyprios (2022,2024, 2025), Emily Dickinson (2023), Scandinavia (2026)

Leading trainer (12 wins):

- Aidan O'Brien – Yeats (2007, 2008), Fame and Glory (2011, 2012), Leading Light (2014), Bondi Beach (2016), Order of St George (2018), Kyprios (2022,2024,2025), Emily Dickinson (2023), Scandinavia (2026)

== Winners ==
Year	Winner	Age	Jockey	Trainer	Time
2003	Holy Orders	6	Davy Condon	Willie Mullins	2:59.00
2004	Jade Quest	4	Warren O'Connor	Charles O'Brien	2:50.00
2005	Icklingham	5	Fran Berry	John Oxx	3:11.30
2006	Kastoria	5	Mick Kinane	John Oxx	2:54.70
2007	Yeats	6	Seamie Heffernan	Aidan O'Brien	2:48.10
2008	Yeats	7	Seamie Heffernan	Aidan O'Brien	2:54.66
2009	Alandi	4	Mick Kinane	John Oxx	3:02.11
2010	Roses For The Lady	4	Fran Berry	John Oxx	2:46.82
2011	Fame and Glory	5	Jamie Spencer	Aidan O'Brien	2:55.89
2012	Fame and Glory	6	Joseph O'Brien	Aidan O'Brien	3:06.90
2013	Voleuse de Coeurs	4	Pat Smullen	Dermot Weld	3:07.76
2014	Leading Light	4	Joseph O'Brien	Aidan O'Brien	3:03.89
2015	Forgotten Rules	5	Pat Smullen	Dermot Weld	3:04.33
2016	Bondi Beach	4	Seamie Heffernan	Aidan O'Brien	3:05.03
2017	Torcedor	5	Colm O'Donoghue	Jessica Harrington	3:02.50
2018	Order of St George	6	Ryan Moore	Aidan O'Brien	3:16.28
2019	Master of Reality	4	Wayne Lordan	Joseph O'Brien	3:10.24
2020	Twilight Payment (Note: The 2020 race was run at the Curragh in June due to the COVID-19 pandemic in the Republic of Ireland)	7	Wayne Lordan	Joseph O'Brien	3:08.22
2021	Baron Samedi	4	Dylan Browne McMonagle	Joseph O'Brien	3:06.78
2022	Kyprios	4	Ryan Moore	Aidan O'Brien	3:04.60
2023	Emily Dickinson	4	Ryan Moore	Aidan O'Brien	3:28.01
2024	Kyprios	6	Ryan Moore	Aidan O'Brien	3:11.84
2025	Kyprios	7	Ryan Moore	Aidan O'Brien	3:15.17
2026	Scandinavia	4	Ryan Moore	Aidan O'Brien	3:03.28

== See also ==
- Horse racing in Ireland
- List of Irish flat horse races
