= Leading Light =

Irish-bred Thoroughbred racehorse

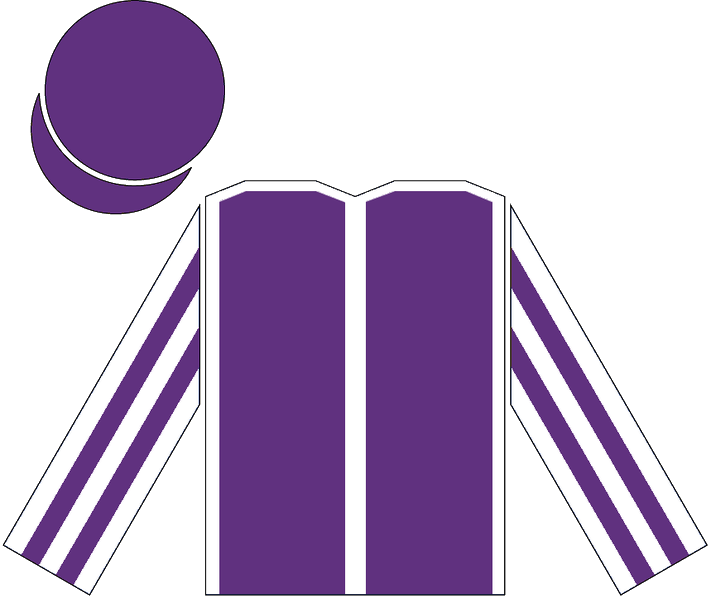
- Racing colours of Derrick Smith
- Sire: Montjeu
- Grandsire: Sadler's Wells
- Dam: Dance Parade
- Damsire: Gone West
- Sex: Colt
- Foaled: 6 March 2010
- Country: Ireland
- Colour: Bay
- Breeder: Lynch-Bages Ltd
- Owner: Derrick Smith, Mrs John Magnier, Michael Tabor
- Trainer: Aidan O'Brien
- Record: 12: 8-1-0
- Earnings: £760,981

Major wins
- Gallinule Stakes (2013); Queen's Vase (2013); St Leger Stakes (2013); Vintage Crop Stakes (2014); Ascot Gold Cup (2014); Irish St Leger Trial Stakes (2014)

Awards
- Cartier Champion Stayer (2014)

Leading Light (foaled 6 March 2010) is an Irish Thoroughbred racehorse. As a two-year-old, he was well-beaten in his first race before winning a maiden race. In 2013, he established himself as a leading stayer, winning his first four races, including the Gallinule Stakes, the Queen's Vase, and the classic St Leger Stakes. As a four-year-old, he won the Vintage Crop Stakes before winning the Ascot Gold Cup.

== Background ==
Leading Light is a bay horse with a broad white blaze and a white coronet on his right foreleg bred in Ireland by Lynch-Bages Ltd. He is one of many top-class horses sired by Montjeu. Others include the Derby winners Motivator, Authorized, Pour Moi and Camelot, the St Leger winners Scorpion and Masked Marvel, and the Prix de l'Arc de Triomphe winner Hurricane Run. Leading Light's dam Dance parade was a top-class racemare whose wins included the Queen Mary Stakes and the Fred Darling Stakes.

In October 2011, the yearling was consigned by the Glenvale Stud to the Tattersalls sales at Newmarket. He was bought for 520,000 guineas by the bloodstock agent Dermot "Demi" O'Byrne, acting on behalf of John Magnier's Coolmore organisation. He was sent into training with Aidan O'Brien at Ballydoyle. Like many Coolmore horses, the details of Leading Light's ownership change from race to race. He has sometimes been registered as being owned by Derrick Smith, while on other occasions he races for the partnership of Smith, Susan Magnier and Michael Tabor.

== Racing career ==
=== 2012: two-year-old season ===
Leading Light made his racecourse debut in a one-mile maiden race at Galway Racecourse on 4 August 2012. Ridden by Seamie Heffernan, he started at odds of 100/30 and finished fourth of the five runners, fifteen lengths behind the winner, Sugar Boy. After a break of two months, Leading Light reappeared in a nine-furlong maiden race on heavy ground at Tipperary Racecourse where he was ridden by Kevin Manning. Starting favourite against eight opponents, he took the lead inside the final furlong and won by 1 1/2 lengths from Silky Pyrus.

=== 2013: three-year-old season ===
Leading Light made his first appearance as a three-year-old in a minor race over ten furlongs at Navan Racecourse on 7 May. Ridden for the first time by Joseph O'Brien, he led from the start and drew clear in the last quarter mile to win by seven lengths from the favourite Dibayani. Nineteen days later, the colt was moved up in class for the Group Three Gallinule Stakes at the Curragh. He led for most of the race and won by two and a quarter lengths from Little White Cloud. Leading Light was then sent to England and moved up in distance for the Queen's Vase over two miles at Royal Ascot. Starting the 5/4 favourite, he took the lead in the straight and held the persistent challenge of the 20/1 outsider Feel Like Dancing to win by 1 1/2 lengths. After the race, Joseph O'Brien said, "I was a bit worried about the trip. He's very relaxed and has a great attitude, when you get stuck into him he fights. He's very idle and was always just doing enough."

On 14 September, Leading Light was one of eleven three-year-olds to contest the 237th running of the St Leger over 14 1/2 furlongs at Doncaster Racecourse. He was made the 7/2 favourite ahead of a field which included the filly Talent, winner of The Oaks and the colts Galileo Rock and Libertarian who had finished second and third in The Derby. O'Brien settled the colt in second place behind Cap o'Rushes before moving into the lead in the straight. He stayed on strongly in the closing stages to win by one and a quarter lengths and three-quarters of a length from Talent and Galileo Rock. O'Brien said: "he jumped a bit slowly and I could see a couple of horses going forward. I knew we weren't going to go much of a gallop, so I gave mine a kick just to get up there. I knew if I didn't hit him until a furlong and a half out he would win". Commenting on the colt's future, John Magnier said, "We will look at the Arc now – he's got plenty of speed. We will talk about that."

On 3 October, Leading Light's owners paid a supplementary fee of €100,000 to enter the horse in the Arc de Triomphe. In the race on 6 October, the colt was never in contention and eventually finished twelfth of the seventeen runners behind Treve.

=== 2014: four-year-old season ===
On his four-year-old debut, Leading Light started the even-money favourite for the Group Three Vintage Crop Stakes over fourteen furlongs at the Curragh. He took the lead approaching the final furlong and drew clear to win by three lengths from the 2012 Irish St. Leger winner Royal Diamond. After the race, O'Brien praised the colt's performance, saying, "I couldn't be happier. He had strengthened up over the winter and has been doing all the right things. He has progressed lovely... We haven't seen the bottom of him yet".

On 19 June, Leading Light was moved up in distance for the 207th running of the Gold Cup at Royal Ascot. Ridden by O'Brien, he was made the 10/11 favourite, with his main opposition expected to come from the Queen's mare Estimate, the winner of the race in 2013, Brown Panther (Goodwood Cup, Ormonde Stakes, Henry II Stakes) and the German-trained Altano (Prix du Cadran). O'Brien tracked the leaders as the pace was set by the Irish mare Missunited before moving up approaching the final turn into the straight. He took the lead a furlong out and prevailed in a closely contested finish, holding off Estimate by a neck, with Missunited a short head away in third. Leading Light became the first Classic winner to win the race since Classic Cliche in 1994. O'Brien, who received a £3,000 fine for excessive use of the whip, described the winner as "laid-back and as tough as nails".

Leading Light was brought back in distance for the Irish St. Leger Trial over one and three quarter miles at the Curragh on 24 August. He started at odds of 2/5 and won by one and a quarter lengths from Royal Diamond, having taken the lead a furlong and a half from the finish. The winning jockey, Joseph O'Brien commented "I was giving weight all round to decent horses and when he gets there he always has a good look. He always just does enough and he's a great horse". In the Irish St. Leger over the same course and distance three weeks later, Leading Light started the 9/10 favourite against ten opponents. Held up by O'Brien in the early stages, he made progress in the straight but never looked likely to reach the lead and finished second, 6 1/2 lengths behind Brown Panther and a head in front of Encke. On 18 October, Leading Light started 2/1 favourite for the British Champions Long Distance Cup at Ascot. Racing on heavy ground, he failed to reproduce his best form after being badly hampered early in the race and finished seventh of the nine runners behind the Dermot Weld-trained Forgotten Rules. O'Brien later announced that the colt had sustained serious injuries to both front legs and would probably be retired.

== Assessment and awards ==
In November 2014 Leading Light was named Champion Stayer at the Cartier Racing Awards.

== Pedigree ==
Pedigree of Leading Light (IRE), bay colt, 2010
Sire Montjeu (IRE) 1996	Sadler's Wells; 1981	Northern Dancer	Nearctic
Sire Montjeu (IRE) 1996	Sadler's Wells; 1981	Northern Dancer	Natalma
Sire Montjeu (IRE) 1996	Sadler's Wells; 1981	Fairy Bridge	Bold Reason
Sire Montjeu (IRE) 1996	Sadler's Wells; 1981	Fairy Bridge	Special
Sire Montjeu (IRE) 1996	Floripedes; 1985	Top Ville	High Top
Sire Montjeu (IRE) 1996	Floripedes; 1985	Top Ville	Sega Ville
Sire Montjeu (IRE) 1996	Floripedes; 1985	Toute Cy	Tennyson
Sire Montjeu (IRE) 1996	Floripedes; 1985	Toute Cy	Adele Toumignon
Dam Dance Parade (USA) 1994	Gone West; 1984	Mr. Prospector	Raise a Native
Dam Dance Parade (USA) 1994	Gone West; 1984	Mr. Prospector	Gold Digger
Dam Dance Parade (USA) 1994	Gone West; 1984	Secrettame	Secretariat
Dam Dance Parade (USA) 1994	Gone West; 1984	Secrettame	Tamarett
Dam Dance Parade (USA) 1994	River Jig; 1984	Irish River	Riverman
Dam Dance Parade (USA) 1994	River Jig; 1984	Irish River	Irish Star
Dam Dance Parade (USA) 1994	River Jig; 1984	Baronova	Nijinsky
Dam Dance Parade (USA) 1994	River Jig; 1984	Baronova	Tsessebe (Family: 2-f)
