= Alandi (horse) =

Irish-bred Thoroughbred racehorse

- Sire: Galileo
- Grandsire: Sadler's Wells
- Dam: Aliya
- Damsire: Darshaan
- Sex: Stallion
- Foaled: 4 April 2005
- Country: Ireland
- Colour: Bay
- Breeder: Aga Khan IV
- Owner: Aga Khan IV; Lloyd Williams
- Trainer: John Oxx; Robert Hickmott; P J Prendergast
- Record: 14: 5-2-0
- Earnings: £386,186

Major wins
- Vintage Crop Stakes (2009); Ballycullen Stakes (2009); Irish St. Leger (2009); Prix du Cadran (2009)

Alandi (foaled 4 April 2005) is an Irish-bred Thoroughbred racehorse and sire. He was a slow-maturing horse who did not race as a two-year-old and made only one (winning) appearance at three. As a four-year-old he established himself as one of the best staying racehorses in the world with victories in the Vintage Crop Stakes, Ballycullen Stakes, Irish St. Leger and Prix du Cadran. He was then sold to race in Australia as a Melbourne Cup prospect but failed to reproduce his European form. A return to Europe in 2012 saw no improvement and he was retired from racing to become a breeding stallion in Poland.

== Background ==
Alandi is a bay horse with a large white star and three white socks bred in Ireland by his owner Aga Khan IV. The colt was sent into training with John Oxx at Kilcullen in County Kildare and was ridden in all of his early races by Mick Kinane.

He was sired by Galileo, who won the Derby, Irish Derby and King George VI and Queen Elizabeth Stakes in 2001 before becoming a very successful breeding stallion. Galileo's other progeny include Cape Blanco, Frankel, Nathaniel, New Approach, Rip Van Winkle, Found, Minding and Ruler of the World. Alandi was one of several winners produced by the broodmare Aliya who won two of her eight races including the Oyster Stakes in 1997. She was a full sister to Aliysa who finished first in the Epsom Oaks and was the granddam of Alamshar.

== Racing career ==
=== 2008: three-year-old season ===
Alandi did not race as a juvenile and began his track career in a maiden race over one and a half miles on heavy ground at the Curragh Racecourse on 20 October 2008. Starting the 6/4 favourite against twelve opponents he made steady progress in the straight, took the lead inside the final furlong and won by one and three quarter lengths from Street Legal.

=== 2009: four-year-old season ===
Alandi's first run of 2009 saw him stepped up to Listed level for the Vintage Crop Stakes at Navan Racecourse on 26 April in which he started at odds of 4/1 behind the reigning champion stayer Yeats. After racing towards the rear of the eight runner field he took the lead approaching the final furlong, drew clear of the field and won by three and a half lengths from Hindu Kush despite being eased down by Kinane in the final strides. Four weeks later at Leopardstown Alandi started odds-on favourite for the Saval Beg Stakes but after some trouble in running he was beaten a length by Hindu Kush with Sublimity in third.

A month after his defeat in the Saval Beg, the colt returned in the Curragh Cup on 27 June and was made the 9/4 second choice in the betting. He raced in third place but struggled to obtain a clear run in the straight before finishing strongly to take second place beaten a neck by the five-year-old mare Profound Beauty. In the Listed Challenge Stakes at Leopardstown in July he was in contention for most of the way but looked outpaced in the closing stages and finished fifth of the six runners behind Profound Beauty. Despite three consecutive defeats, Alandi started odds-on favourite when he contested the Listed Ballycullen Stakes at Fairyhouse on 22 August. He took the lead a quarter of a mile from the finish and pulled clear of the field to win "very easily" by five lengths from his stablemate Aliyfa.

In the Irish St. Leger at the Curragh on 12 September Alandi started the 3/1 second favourite behind Godolphin Racing's multiple Group 1 winner Schiaparelli. Profound Beauty an Yeats were again in opposition whilst the best-fancied of the other four runners was the Fred Archer Stakes winner All The Aces. Schiaparelli set the pace with Alandi settled behind the leaders before moving up into second place in the straight. Alandi overtook the favourite just inside the final furlong and held off a persistent challenge from the British filly Clowance to win by half a length. Schiaparelli finished third, five lengths behind Clowance and eighteen lengths ahead of Profound Beauty in fourth. After the race John Oxx said "Mick had fancied him for this race for a while – he always said to me if it was soft he would take some beating. One mile, six furlongs is the bare minimum for him as he's a real grinder. I was happy to see him come off the bridle as early as he did because Mick said afterwards they went a hell of a gallop on such soft ground."

For his final run of the year Alandi was sent to France and stepped up in distance for the Prix du Cadran over 2400 metres at Longchamp Racecourse on 4 October. The Prix Gladiateur winner Kasbah Bliss (also a top class hurdler) started favourite with Alandi on 5/1 and other fancied runners being Yeats, Incanto Dream (Prix Maurice de Nieuil) and Askar Tau (Doncaster Cup). Kinane positioned his mount just behind the leaders and turned into the straight in third place behind Yeats and Incanto Dream. Alandi went to the front 300 metres from the finish and hung on to win by a short head from the fast-finishing Kasbah Bliss. Oxx commented "He's a good horse, very genuine and now goes on all types of ground. Mick has always said two things – one, that on heavy ground he could win the Irish St. Leger, two, that when he tackles extreme distances he could be a Gold Cup candidate. He was spot on with his assessment".

In the 2009 World Thoroughbred Rankings Alandi was given a rating of 119, making him the 65th best racehorse in the world and the second best horse in the Extended distance division.

=== 2010 – 2012: later career ===
Before the start of the 2010 season Alandi was sold to Lloyd Williams and sent to race in Australia where he was trained by Robert Hickmott. His record in Australia was very disappointing as he finished last or last-but-one in all five of his starts. Williams had hoped that the horse would be a major contender for the Melbourne Cup but admitted "I just haven't been able to get him going at all. He's not half the horse he was when John Oxx was training him".

In 2012 Alandi was returned to Europe and joined the stable of P. J. Prendergast in Ireland. He returned to the track at Goodwood Racecourse in August 2012 but failed to recapture his old form as he finished tailed-off last in the Listed March Stakes.

== Stud career ==
After his retirement from racing Alandi began his stud career in 2014 at the Millennium Stud in Strzegom, Poland.

== Pedigree ==
Pedigree of Alandi (IRE), bay stallion, 2005
Sire Galileo (IRE) 1998	Sadler's Wells (USA); 1981	Northern Dancer	Nearctic
Sire Galileo (IRE) 1998	Sadler's Wells (USA); 1981	Northern Dancer	Natalma
Sire Galileo (IRE) 1998	Sadler's Wells (USA); 1981	Fairy Bridge	Bold Reason
Sire Galileo (IRE) 1998	Sadler's Wells (USA); 1981	Fairy Bridge	Special
Sire Galileo (IRE) 1998	Urban Sea (USA); 1989	Miswaki	Mr. Prospector
Sire Galileo (IRE) 1998	Urban Sea (USA); 1989	Miswaki	Hopespringseternal
Sire Galileo (IRE) 1998	Urban Sea (USA); 1989	Allegretta	Lombard
Sire Galileo (IRE) 1998	Urban Sea (USA); 1989	Allegretta	Anatevka
Dam Aliya (IRE) 1994	Darshaan (GB); 1981	Shirley Heights	Mill Reef
Dam Aliya (IRE) 1994	Darshaan (GB); 1981	Shirley Heights	Hardiemma
Dam Aliya (IRE) 1994	Darshaan (GB); 1981	Delsy	Abdos
Dam Aliya (IRE) 1994	Darshaan (GB); 1981	Delsy	Kelty
Dam Aliya (IRE) 1994	Alannya (FR); 1972	Relko	Tanerko
Dam Aliya (IRE) 1994	Alannya (FR); 1972	Relko	Relance
Dam Aliya (IRE) 1994	Alannya (FR); 1972	Nucciolina	Nuccio
Dam Aliya (IRE) 1994	Alannya (FR); 1972	Nucciolina	Mah Behar (Family 9-c)
