= Voleuse de Coeurs =

Irish-bred Thoroughbred racehorse

- Sire: Teofilo
- Grandsire: Galileo
- Dam: Vadorga
- Damsire: Grand Lodge
- Sex: Mare
- Foaled: 20 February 2009
- Country: Ireland
- Colour: Bay
- Breeder: Irish National Stud
- Owner: Lady O'Reilly; Eliza Park International, T K Cheng et al
- Trainer: Dermot Weld; Michael Moroney
- Record: 17: 5-3-2
- Earnings: £294,179

Major wins
- Irish Cesarewitch (2012); Vintage Crop Stakes (2013); Irish St. Leger (2013)

Voleuse de Coeurs (foaled 20 February 2009) is an Irish-bred Thoroughbred racehorse and broodmare. A specialist stayer who was favoured by soft ground she won five of her seventeen races in a track career which lasted from September 2011 until May 2014. She failed to win as a two-year-old but made steady improvement when tried over long distance in the following year, winning three races including the two-mile Irish Cesarewitch (by ten lengths). She continued to improve as a four-year-old, winning the Vintage Crop Stakes and recording her biggest win in the Irish St. Leger. She was then sold to race in Australia where she failed to win in four races.

== Background ==
Voleuse de Coeurs is a bay mare with a large white star bred by the Irish National Stud. As a yearling she was put up for auction at the Goffs Sale and was bought for €30,000 by Skymarc Farm Inc. She entered the ownership of Lady O'Reilly and was sent into training with Dermot Weld at the Curragh, County Kildare.

She was from the first crop of foals sired by Teofilo the undefeated European Champion Two-Year-Old of 2006. Teofilo's other progeny have included Trading Leather, Pleascach and Parish Hall, as well as several major winners in Australia. Her dam Vadorga showed no racing ability, finishing unplaced in all three of her races as a three-year-old in France in 2005. She was, however, a full sister to Vahorimix (winner of the Poule d'Essai des Poulains) and was closely related to Valixir, Val Royal and Valyra.

The mare's name is French for Thief of Hearts.

== Racing career ==
=== 2011: two-year-old season ===
On her racecourse debut, Voleuse de Coeurs finished third of the fifteen runners in a maiden race over one mile at Gowran Park on 24 September. Eleven days later she started at odds of 5/2 for a similar event at Navan Racecourse and finished fifth, more than ten lengths behind the Aidan O'Brien-trained favourite Kissed.

=== 2012: three-year-old season ===
Voleuse de Coeurs began her second season in a maiden over ten and a half furlongs at Dundalk Racecourse in April in which she stayed on well in straight but was beaten a neck into second by the colt Ursa Major. On May 19 the filly started 13/8 favourite for a minor race over 11 1/2 furlongs at Wexford Racecourse and recorded her first success as he took the lead two furlong from the finish and won by a length and a quarter from Zabana. Voleuse de Coeurs spent the rest of the season running in handicap races. Racing over middle distances she finished fourth to Ursa Major at the Curragh in June and fourth again to Beach of Falesa at Killarney on 15 July. When moved up in distance for a two miles at Galway Races two weeks later she produced a marked improvement as she took the lead in the last quarter mile and drew away to win "easily" by eight lengths from the five-year-old Domination.

Pat Smullen had ridden Voleuse de Coeurs in all her races up to this point but Leigh Roche took over the ride when the filly contested the Irish Cesarewitch over two miles on heavy ground at the Curragh on 14 October. Carrying 127 pounds, and starting 6/1 favourite in a 27-runner field, she only went to the front a furlong out but then rapidly pulled clear of her rivals to win by ten lengths. Dermot Weld's son and assistant Kris Weld commented "We thought she would win and that has been the plan since Galway. It was soft in Galway, but very different conditions today. It was real winter ground and I haven’t seen it as bad on the Curragh before. Leigh gave her a great ride and dad saw it live in Canada. She won like the decent filly she is. She’ll stay in training and hopefully she can pick up some black type next year".

=== 2013: four-year-old season ===
In 2013 Voleuse de Coeurs made her seasonal debut in a minor race over 1 1/2 miles at Limerick Racecourse in April in which she finished second to El Salvador. On 19 May she was moved back up in distance for the Listed Vintage Crop Stakes over 1 3/4 miles at Navan and started 7/4 second choice in the betting behind El Salvador with the best of the other runners appearing to be the high-class hurdler Steps To Freedom. Smullen restrained the filly in the early stages before moving up to take the lead a furlong out at which point Voleuse de Coeurs "forged clear" to win by two lengths from Missunited. Weld, who trained the horse after which the race was named, said "I see her as being very progressive and possibly an outstanding stayer. I thought she would win and this is a race I wanted to win". The filly made her first appearance at Group level on 30 June in the Curragh Cup for which she started favourite but came home third behind Ernest Hemingway and Royal Diamond.

After a break of almost seven weeks, Voleuse de Coeurs faced Ernest Hemingway and Royal Diamond in the Irish St Leger Trial Stakes at the Curragh on 24 August. She raced in second place behind Royal Diamond for most of the way but was unable to overhaul the leader and finished runner-up, beaten half a length by the winner. Chris Hayes took the ride when Voleuse de Coeurs contested the Group 1 Irish St. Leger at the Curragh on 15 September and started at odds of 9/1 in a ten-runner field. The British-trained gelding Ahzeemah (winner of the Lonsdale Cup) started favourite while the other runners included Royal Diamond, Ernest Hemingway, Red Cadeaux, Saddler's Rock (Goodwood Cup) and Pale Mimosa (Saval Beg Stakes). Royal Diamond took an early lead and set the pace with Voleuse de Coeurs settled in mid-division before making steady progress from half way. The filly took the lead three furlongs out and went clear of the field, winning by six lengths from Ahzeemah despite being eased down by Hayes in the final strides. Although Lady O'Reilly talked of retiring the filly, Dermot Weld said "She's a smart filly and a model of consistency", he said after the race. "She ran a cracking trial behind Royal Diamond and I knew she would improve for that. She's a joy to train and is very straightforward... I will try and encourage Lady O'Reilly to keep her in training as I think she will be a high-class Cup mare at five."

In October Voleuse de Coeurs was bought privately by an Australian-based group and was redirected to the Melbourne Cup. The Australian Mick Moroney immediately became her official trainer and she was sent into quarantine for her journey to Melbourne. On 5 November at Flemington Racecourse the filly started at odds of 17/1 for the Melbourne Cup and finished tenth of the 24 runners behind Fiorente.

=== 2014: five-year-old season ===
Voleuse de Coeurs remained in training with Moroney in Australia for the first half of 2014. She made little impression in three starts against top-class opposition, finishing fifth in the Australian Cup, fifth in The BMW and twelfth in the Sydney Cup.

== Pedigree ==
Pedigree of Voleuse de Coeurs (IRE), bay mare, 2009
Sire Teofilo (IRE) 2004	Galileo (IRE); 1998	Sadler's Wells	Northern Dancer
Sire Teofilo (IRE) 2004	Galileo (IRE); 1998	Sadler's Wells	Fairy Bridge
Sire Teofilo (IRE) 2004	Galileo (IRE); 1998	Urban Sea	Miswaki
Sire Teofilo (IRE) 2004	Galileo (IRE); 1998	Urban Sea	Allegretta
Sire Teofilo (IRE) 2004	Speirbhean (IRE); 1998	Danehill	Danzig
Sire Teofilo (IRE) 2004	Speirbhean (IRE); 1998	Danehill	Razyana
Sire Teofilo (IRE) 2004	Speirbhean (IRE); 1998	Saviour	Majestic Light
Sire Teofilo (IRE) 2004	Speirbhean (IRE); 1998	Saviour	Victorian Queen
Dam Vadorga (GB) 2002	Grand Lodge (USA); 1991	Chief's Crown	Danzig
Dam Vadorga (GB) 2002	Grand Lodge (USA); 1991	Chief's Crown	Six Crowns
Dam Vadorga (GB) 2002	Grand Lodge (USA); 1991	La Papagena	Habitat
Dam Vadorga (GB) 2002	Grand Lodge (USA); 1991	La Papagena	Magic Flute
Dam Vadorga (GB) 2002	Vadsa Honor (FR); 1993	Highest Honor	Kenmare
Dam Vadorga (GB) 2002	Vadsa Honor (FR); 1993	Highest Honor	High River
Dam Vadorga (GB) 2002	Vadsa Honor (FR); 1993	Vadsa	Halo
Dam Vadorga (GB) 2002	Vadsa Honor (FR); 1993	Vadsa	Rainbow's Edge (Family: 20-d)

- Voleuse de Coeurs was inbred 4 × 4 to Danzig, meaning that this stallion appears twice in the fourth generation of her pedigree.
