= Stalino (disambiguation) =

Stalino is a former name of Donetsk, Ukraine.

Stalino may also refer to:

- Murgap, Turkmenistan, formerly Stalino
- Stalino, a horse, Irish Triple Crown race winner of 1945
