= Irish St Leger Trial Stakes =

Flat horse race in Ireland

- Class: Group 3
- Location: Curragh Racecourse; County Kildare, Ireland
- Race type: Flat / Thoroughbred
- Sponsor: Comer Group
- Website: Curragh

Race information
- Distance: 1m 6f (2,816 metres)
- Surface: Turf
- Track: Right-handed
- Qualification: Three-years-old and up
- Weight: 8 st 12 lb (3yo); 9 st 8 lb (4yo+); Allowances; 3 lb for fillies and mares Penalties; 5 lb for G1 / G2 winners * 3 lb for G3 winners * * at 10 furlongs or over since 1 January this year
- Purse: €51,700 (2022); 1st: €32,450

Irish St Leger Trial Stakes
2026
Queenstown	Kizlyar	Leinster

Previous years
2025
Leinster	Dallas Star	Absurde
2024
Grosvenor Square	Courageous Strike	A Piece Of Heaven
2023
Shamida	Dawn Rising	Okita Soushi
2022
Raise You	Search For A Song	Moon Daisy
2021
Twilight Payment	Princess Zoe	Emperor Of The Sun

2020-2011
2020
Delphi	Master Of Reality	Micro Manage
2019
Southern France	Downdraft	Master Of Reality
2018
Flag Of Honour	Twilight Payment	Giuseppe Garibaldi
2017
Order Of St George	Rekindling	Twilight Payment
2016
Order Of St George	Twilight Payment	Arya Tara
2015
Order Of St George	Sea Moon	Kingfisher
2014
Leading Light	Royal Diamond	Shu Lewis
2013
Royal Diamond	Voleuse De Coeurs	Ernest Hemingway
2012
Ursa Major	Hartani	David Livingston
2011
Fictional Account	Fame And Glory	Saddler's Rock

2010-2001
2010
Rajik	Silverhand	Roses For The Lady
2009
Alandi	Aliyfa	Loch Long
2008
Hasanka	Hold Me Love Me	Ballyhaunis
2007
Red Moloney	Hasanka	Vision Of Grandeur
2006
Tusculum	Good Surprise	Clara Allen
2005
Right Key	Foreign Affairs	Mkuzi
2004
Holy Orders	Mkuzi	Maharib
2003
Cruzspiel	Golly Gosh	Moonbi Ridge
2002
Pugin	Dibiya	Last Theatre
2001
Vinnie Roe	Pugin	Affianced

2000-1995
2000
Katiykha	Chimes At Midnight	Media Puzzle
1999
Royal Rebel	Try For Ever	Golden Rule
1998
On Call	Ebadiyla	Rose Petal
1997
Dr Johnson	Aliya	Buddy Marvel
1996
Mohaajir	Munif	Tasdid
1995
Vintage Crop	Johansson	Lake Kariba

The Irish St Leger Trial Stakes is a Group 3 flat horse race in Ireland open to thoroughbreds aged three years or older. It is run at the Curragh over a distance of 1 mile and 6 furlongs (2,816 metres), and it is scheduled to take place each year in August.

== History ==
The race was first run in 1995, although its original title of Ballycullen Stakes was used for a much shorter Listed race prior to this. It was held at Leopardstown before switching to the Curragh in 2000. It was run at Fairyhouse between 2002 and 2005 and also in 2009.

The race became known as the Irish St Leger Trial Stakes in 2011. It was promoted to Group 3 status in 2012.

The race serves as a trial for the following month's Irish St Leger. The last horse to win both races in the same year was Flag of Honour in 2018.

== Records ==
Most successful horse since 1989 (3 wins):

- Order of St George - 2015, 2016, 2017

Leading jockey since 1989 (5 wins):

- Michael Kinane – Cherry Grove Lad (1992), Pre-Eminent (1993), Vintage Crop (1995), Hasanka (2008), Alandi (2009)
- Johnny Murtagh - George Augustus (1991), Royal Rebel (1999), Katiykha (2000), Pugin (2002), Royal Diamond (2013)

Leading trainer since 1989 (9 wins):

- Aidan O'Brien - Tusculum (2006), Leading Light (2014), Order of St George (2015, 2016, 2017), Flag of Honour (2018), Southern France (2019), Delphi (2020), Grosvenor Square (2024)

== Winners ==
Year	Winner	Age	Jockey	Trainer	Time
1995	Vintage Crop	8	Michael Kinane	Dermot Weld	3:01.40
1996	Mohaajir	5	Kevin Manning	Jim Bolger	3:07.80
1997	Dr Johnson	3	Christy Roche	Charles O'Brien	3:10.70
1998	On Call	3	George Duffield	Sir Mark Prescott	3:05.90
1999	Royal Rebel	3	Johnny Murtagh	Mark Johnston	3:05.90
2000	Katiykha	4	Johnny Murtagh	John Oxx	3:05.00
2001	Vinnie Roe	3	Pat Smullen	Dermot Weld	3:02.30
2002	Pugin	4	Johnny Murtagh	John Oxx	3:00.80
2003	Cruzspiel	3	Fran Berry	John Oxx	2:55.60
2004	Holy Orders	7	Davy Condon	Willie Mullins	3:01.00
2005	Right Key	3	Declan McDonogh	Kevin Prendergast	2:58.30
2006	Tusculum	3	Seamie Heffernan	Aidan O'Brien	2:59.10
2007	Red Moloney	3	Declan McDonogh	Kevin Prendergast	3:08.53
2008	Hasanka	4	Michael Kinane	John Oxx	3:15.45
2009	Alandi	4	Michael Kinane	John Oxx	3:07.05
2010	Rajik	5	Declan McDonogh	Charlie Swan	2:59.05
2011	Fictional Account	6	Fran Berry	Vincent Ward
2012	Ursa Major	3	Fergal Lynch	Tommy Carmody	3:12.72
2013	Royal Diamond	7	Johnny Murtagh	Johnny Murtagh	2:58.88
2014	Leading Light	4	Joseph O'Brien	Aidan O'Brien	2:59.85
2015	Order of St George	3	Seamie Heffernan	Aidan O'Brien	3:09.61
2016	Order of St George	4	Donnacha O'Brien	Aidan O'Brien	3:09.20
2017	Order of St George	5	Ryan Moore	Aidan O'Brien	3:05.44
2018	Flag of Honour	3	Donnacha O'Brien	Aidan O'Brien	3:04.61
2019	Southern France	4	Ryan Moore	Aidan O'Brien	3:10.48
2020	Delphi	3	Seamie Heffernan	Aidan O'Brien	3:02.29
2021	Twilight Payment	8	Declan McDonogh	Joseph O'Brien	3:05.31
2022	Raise You	6	Shane Crosse	Joseph O'Brien	3:05.23
2023	Shamida	3	Chris Hayes	Dermot Weld	3:09.81
2024	Grosvenor Square	3	Ryan Moore	Aidan O'Brien	2:56.50
2025	Leinster	4	Dylan Browne McMonagle	Joseph O'Brien	3:03.84

== Ballycullen Stakes winners since 1989 ==
Year	Winner	Age	Jockey	Trainer	Time
1989	Wood Dancer	4	John Reid	William Hastings-Bass	1:53.00
1990	Kostroma	4	Stephen Craine	Tommy Stack	1:51.20
1991	George Augustus	3	Johnny Murtagh	John Oxx	1:52.50
1992	Cherry Grove Lad	4	Michael Kinane	Dermot Weld	1:56.60
1993	Pre-Eminent	6	Michael Kinane	Dermot Weld	1:58.10
1994	Ballykett Nancy	3	Kevin Manning	Jim Bolger	2:06.80

== See also ==
- Horse racing in Ireland
- List of Irish flat horse races
