= Royal Diamond =

Irish-bred Thoroughbred racehorse

- Sire: King's Best
- Grandsire: Kingmambo
- Dam: Irresistible Jewel
- Damsire: Danehill
- Sex: Gelding
- Foaled: 9 February 2006
- Country: Ireland
- Colour: Bay
- Breeder: Moyglare Stud
- Owner: E B Rimmer-Osborne House; Andrew Tinkler
- Trainer: Mark Prescott; Michael Dods; Jonjo O'Neill; Tommy Carmody; Johnny Murtagh
- Record: 39: 9-7-5
- Earnings: £428,442

Major wins
- Irish St. Leger (2012); Challenge Stakes (2013); Irish St Leger Trial Stakes (2013); British Champions Long Distance Cup (2013)

Royal Diamond (foaled 9 February 2006) is an Irish-bred Thoroughbred racehorse. A slow maturing stayer who was gelded before he appeared on a racecourse, he passed through the hands of five different trainers in a track career which lasted from September 2008 until November 2014. He won several minor races as a three-year-old in 2009 but then lost his form and failed to win in the next two seasons, including and unsuccessful stint as a National Hunt horse. He finally emerged as a top-class performer at the age of six when he rebounded from an unlucky defeat in the Ebor Handicap to record an upset victory in the Irish St. Leger. He was at least as good in the following season when he won the Challenge Stakes, Irish St. Leger Trial Stakes and British Champions Long Distance Cup. He was retired from racing after failing to win in 2014.

== Background ==
Royal Diamond is a bay gelding with two small white facial markings bred in Ireland by the Moyglare Stud. As a yearling he was consigned to the Goffs sale in October 2007 and was bought for €70,000 by the trainer Mark Prescott. He entered the ownership of E B Rimmer-Osborne House and was taken into training by Prescott as his Heath House Stable in Newmarket, Suffolk.

He was from the fifth crop of foals sired by King's Best who won the 2000 Guineas in 2000. His other progeny included Workforce, Creachadoir, Proclamation, Eishin Flash (Tokyo Yushun, Tenno Sho), Sajjhaa (Dubai Duty Free Stakes) and King's Apostle (Prix Maurice de Gheest). His dam Irresistible Jewel was a top-class racemare who won the Ribblesdale Stakes in 2002 and went on to become a very successful broodmare whose other foals have included Princess Highway (Ribblesdale Stakes) and Mad About You (Gladness Stakes). She was descended from the British broodmare Fictitious (foaled 1957) whose other descendants included Blushing John.

Royal Diamond was gelded in February 2008, before the start of his racing career.

== Racing career ==
=== 2008 – 2011: early career ===
Royal Diamond showed little promise as two-year-old. After finishing fourth in a maiden race at Yarmouth Racecourse on 17 September he ran unplaced in similar events at Warwick and Lingfield.

After finishing last of nine on his three-year-old debut, the gelding was moved up in distance and produced a much better effort when finishing second in a handicap over fourteen furlongs at Haydock Park. On 29 July at Sandown Park Racecourse Royal Diamond was assigned a weight of 123 pounds in a handicap and recorded his first success as he won by two and a half lengths at odds of 6/1. The gelding remained unbeaten for the rest of the 2009 season, although his campaign was restricted to minor handicaps over extended distances: he won at Yarmouth in August, Ffos Las in September and Wolverhampton in October. At the end of October Royal Diamond was put up for auction at Tattersalls and was sold for 400,000 guineas to the trainer Michael Dods. The horse passed into the ownership of Andrew Tinkler and joined Dods' stable at Denton, County Durham.

Royal Diamond's time at Dods' stable in 2010 proved to be extremely disappointing as he finished unplaced in all four of his races. In 2011 the gelding was transferred to the stable of Jonjo O'Neill who prepared the horse for a National Hunt campaign. After recording one third place from three runs on the flat in the early part of 2011 Royal Diamond was switched to Hurdling but appeared to show little aptitude for the sport. He fell on his jumping debut at Huntingdon Racecourse and was well beaten in two subsequent appearances over obstacles.

=== 2012: six-year-old season ===
For the 2012 Flat season, Royal Diamond was moved to Ireland and joined the stable of the former steeplechase jockey Tommy Carmody at the Curragh in County Kildare. After finishing third in a minor race at Dundalk he recorded his first win in two and a half years when he was ridden to victory by Johnny Murtagh in a handicap at Leopardstown on 15 April. He was then moved up in class, finishing second in a valuable handicap at the Curragh in May and third in the Ulster Derby in June. In August the gelding was sent to England for the Ebor Handicap at York Racecourse in which he carried a weight of 126 pounds and started at odds of 16/1. After disputing the lead for most of the way he was beaten a neck by the Godolphin representative Willing Foe after being badly hampered as the winner hung to the left in the closing stages.

Royal Diamond made his first appearance in a Group race on 15 September when he started a 16/1 outsider for the Group One Irish St. Leger over fourteen furlongs on yielding ground at the Curragh. Fame and Glory started favourite ahead of Brown Panther while the other runners included Hartani (Curragh Cup), Aiken (Grand Prix de Chantilly), Massiyn (second in the Ballyroan Stakes) and Simenon (Queen Alexandra Stakes). Fame and Glory set a steady pace with Royal Diamond, partnered by Niall McCullagh, settled in fourth place in the early stages before moving into contention approaching the final turn. Fame and Glory went clear of the field in the straight but then began to struggle as Massiyn, Brown Panther, Aiken and Royal Diamond all stayed on strongly. In a "blanket finish" Royal Diamond gained the advantage in the final stride and won by a head, a short head and a neck from Massiyn, Brown Panther and Aiken.

=== 2013: seven-year-old season ===
In early 2013, Royal Diamond was sent to the United Arab Emirates and ran twice at Meydan Racecourse in March, making little impact as he ran unplaced in the Nad Al Sheba Trophy and the Sheema Classic. On his returen to Europe in May he produced a slightly better effort as he came home third behind Glen's Diamond and Top Trip in the Yorkshire Cup. A week after his run at York, Royal Diamond changed trainers yet again, moving to the recently established stable of Johnny Murtagh at Coolaghknock Glebe, County Kildare. Murtagh both trained and rode the horse in his remaining six races that year.

Royal Diamond was beaten five lengths into second by the Aidan O'Brien-trained Ernest Hemingway in the Curragh Cup in June and was then dropped in class for the Listed Challenge Stakes at Leopardstown Racecourse in July. Starting the 5/4 favourite he took the lead from the start, opened up a clear lead, and won by three and three quarter lengths from Sir Ector despite being eased down by Murtagh in the closing stages. On 8 August in the Ballyroan Stakes he was again beaten by Ernest Hemingway but on this occasion he finished only half a length behind the O'Brien colt. In the Irish St. Leger Trial Stakes sixteen days later he faced Ernest Hemingway yet again in a five-runner field which also included Sir Ector and the improving four-year-old filly Voleuse de Coeurs. Murtagh sent the gelding into the lead from the start and Royal Diamond held off a sustained challenge from Voleuse de Coeurs to win by half a length, with Ernest Hemingway finishing five and a half lengths back in third place. Johnny Murtagh commented "He's really come on from the last day. I tried to be a bit clever last time by going quick but not too quick in front. He comes good at this time of year. Hopefully in three weeks' time he'll come back here and defend his title. He's a wonderful horse for us to have".

On 15 September Royal Diamond attempted to reproduce his 2012 success in the Irish St. Leger and started at odds of 9/2 in a ten-runner field. He led for most of the way but was outpaced in the straight and finished fifth behind Voleuse de Coeurs. The gelding ended his season with a run in the British Champions Long Distance Cup at Ascot Racecourse on 19 October in which he started a 20/1 outsider. The field was headed by the Ascot Gold Cup winner Estimate and included several other top stayers including Saddler's Rock (Goodwood Cup, Doncaster Cup), Harris Tweed (John Porter Stakes) Ahzeemah (Lonsdale Cup) and Times Up (Doncaster Cup). In a tactical change, Murtagh restrained the horse in seventh place before making a forward move in the straight. He stayed on strongly in the closing stages, caught the leader Harris Tweed on the line and won by a nose. After the race Johnny Murtagh said "It's the best day of my life. I can't thank everyone enough for giving me the horses and trusting me. I don't know what to say – I'm stuck for words. He's been a brilliant horse from day one."

=== 2014: eight-year-old season ===
Royal Diamond remained in training as an eight-year-old but failed to win in five races. He finished second to Leading Light in the Vintage Crop Stakes and then ran unplaced behind the same horse in the Ascot Gold Cup. He was then beaten by Leading Light yet again when finishing second in the Irish St. Leger Stakes. Royal Diamond made a third appearance in the Irish St. Leger, finishing sixth to Brown Panther and was then sent to Australia for a run in the Melbourne Cup. He was made a 100/1 outsider and finished tailed off at the rear of the field.

== Pedigree ==
Pedigree of Royal Diamond (IRE), bay gelding, 2006
Sire King's Best (USA) 1997	Kingmambo (USA); 1990	Mr. Prospector	Raise a Native
Sire King's Best (USA) 1997	Kingmambo (USA); 1990	Mr. Prospector	Gold Digger
Sire King's Best (USA) 1997	Kingmambo (USA); 1990	Miesque	Nureyev
Sire King's Best (USA) 1997	Kingmambo (USA); 1990	Miesque	Pasadoble
Sire King's Best (USA) 1997	Allegretta (GB); 1978	Lombard	Agio
Sire King's Best (USA) 1997	Allegretta (GB); 1978	Lombard	Promised Lady
Sire King's Best (USA) 1997	Allegretta (GB); 1978	Anatevka	Espresso
Sire King's Best (USA) 1997	Allegretta (GB); 1978	Anatevka	Almyra
Dam Irresistible Jewel (IRE) 1999	Danehill (USA); 1986	Danzig	Northern Dancer
Dam Irresistible Jewel (IRE) 1999	Danehill (USA); 1986	Danzig	Pas de Nom
Dam Irresistible Jewel (IRE) 1999	Danehill (USA); 1986	Razyana	His Majesty
Dam Irresistible Jewel (IRE) 1999	Danehill (USA); 1986	Razyana	Spring Adieu
Dam Irresistible Jewel (IRE) 1999	In Anticipation (IRE); 1991	Sadler's Wells	Northern Dancer
Dam Irresistible Jewel (IRE) 1999	In Anticipation (IRE); 1991	Sadler's Wells	Fairy Bridge
Dam Irresistible Jewel (IRE) 1999	In Anticipation (IRE); 1991	Aptostar	Fappiano
Dam Irresistible Jewel (IRE) 1999	In Anticipation (IRE); 1991	Aptostar	Stark Drama (family: 1-l)

- Through his dam, Irresistible Jewel, Royal Diamond was inbred 4 × 4 to Northern Dancer, meaning that this stallion appears twice in the fourth generation of his pedigree.
