= Scandinavia (horse) =

American thoroughbred racehorse (foaled 2022)

- Racing silks of Michael Tabor
- Sire: Justify
- Grandsire: Scat Daddy
- Dam: Fabulous
- Damsire: Galileo
- Sex: Colt
- Foaled: May 9, 2022
- Country: United States
- Color: Bay
- Breeder: Orpendale/Chelson/Wynatt
- Owner: Michael Tabor, Derrick Smith, and Sue Magnier
- Trainer: Aidan O'Brien
- Record: 14: 9-2-1
- Earnings: $2,489,039

Major wins
- Bahrain Trophy (2025); Goodwood Cup (2025, 2026); St. Leger Stakes (2025); Saval Beg Stakes (2026); Ascot Gold Cup (2026); Irish St. Leger (2026)

Awards
- Cartier Champion Stayer (2026); Timeform rating: 128+
- Last updated on 20 November 2026

Scandinavia is an American-bred, Irish-trained thoroughbred racehorse who won multiple Grade 1 races in 2025 and 2026, including the Goodwood Cup (twice), the Ascot Gold Cup, St Leger Stakes and Irish St. Leger. After struggling to break his maiden in early starts, Scandinavia has turned into one of the strongest active stayers (long-distance running racehorses) in Europe.

== Background ==
Scandinavia is a dark bay or brown colt, foaled May 9, 2022 at Coolmore's American branch, Ashford Stud, in Versailles, Kentucky. He is a son of Justify, a Triple Crown winner in the United States. Through his sire, Scandinavia is a descendant of notable European champion Johannesburg, who won 6 races at age two including the Breeders' Cup Juvenile, and of Breeders' Cup Classic winners Ghostzapper and A.P. Indy. Further back, Scandinavia can claim descent through noted champions Bold Ruler, Secretariat, and Seattle Slew.

His dam, Fabulous, was unraced, but was a daughter of Galileo, who was a dual winner of Classics in Europe, winning the Epsom Derby and the Irish Derby. Galileo, in turn, claimed descent from North American champion and dual Classic winner in the United States Northern Dancer, through his Irish-trained and raced son Sadler's Wells, the 1984 winner of the Irish 2000 Guineas, and Blushing Groom, the 1977 winner of the Poule d'Essai des Poulains.

Upon commencing training, Scandinavia was sent by Coolmore to their base at Ballydoyle in Ireland, where owners Michael Tabor, Derrick Smith, and Sue Magnier placed the colt in training with Aidan O'Brien.

== Racing career ==
=== 2024: Two-year-old Season ===
Scandinavia's two-year-old campaign was uneventful. Beginning in late July 2024 at Leopardstown in Ireland over a mile, Scandinavia lacked a final kick in his debut, losing to Delacroix, who later won the Irish Champion Stakes and the Eclipse Stakes and Green Impact, who won the Juvenile Stakes, thus finishing third. He then came to Newmarket for another tilt at breaking his maiden, but this time came fourth, beaten 3/4 length but could not reach the winner that day either over the mile. To complete his two-year-old campaign, Scandinavia's connections entered him in one last maiden race on St. Leger Stakes Day 2024 (incidentally where a common competitor Illinois would finish second), but the horse would fare poorly, coming home 4 3/4 lengths behind the eventual victor in seventh place. Scandinavia would finish his two-year-old campaign with a record of 3:0-0-1, earning just £1,151.17.

=== 2025: Three-year-old season ===
After a long lay off between races, Scandinavia began his three-year-old campaign with another attempt at breaking his maiden, this time back in Ireland at Navan. Scandinavia proved that distances longer than a mile were his forte, clearing 10 rivals, including later competitor in the Saval Beg Stakes at four Happy Pharoah, by 3 1/4 lengths over 1 mile, 2 furlongs. The strong victory against maiden company conditioned a step up in competition, with Aidan O'Brien sending Scandinavia next to the Queen's Vase over staying distance (1 mile, 6 furlongs, 134 yards) at Ascot during the Royal Meeting. Despite placing fifth on that day, and behind fellow Aidan O'Brien trainee Shackleton, Scandinavia only came in behind the leaders by 1 1/2 lengths in his fifth career start and first in stakes company.

A second shot at stakes company beckoned for Scandinavia. However, between races, he changed jockeys. Ridden in 4 of his first 5 starts by Wayne Lordan with only one victory, Aidan O'Brien changed his charge's assignment to Ryan Moore for his date in the 2025 Bahrain Trophy over 1 mile, 5 furlongs at Newmarket. Facing a field of only five this time, Scandinavia proved no match for this field, motoring clear by an embarrassingly large 8 1/2 lengths, proving that he was a top contender for further staying prizes later in the year. That next prize would be the Goodwood Cup, a race for 3 year-old and older horses in the stayer division run during the Glorious Goodwood Meeting at Goodwood. Presaging later victories at the level, particularly at the Ascot Gold Cup the next year, Scandinavia kicked clear in the final furlong at the 2025 Goodwood Cup to defeat fellow Aidan O'Brien trainee Illinois by 3/4 length. Following the victory, Aidan O'Brien confirmed that the horse would be sent on to contest the St. Leger Stakes at Doncaster in September 2025.

Sent on to contest the St. Leger, Scandinavia confirmed the promise put into him in keeping him in stakes company. With Tom Marquand aboard for the final English Classic race of 2025, Scandinavia held on for a gutsy victory in the 1 mile, 6 furlong, 115 yard contest, beating his closest rival by only a neck and beating that year's Epsom Derby winner Lambourn by only three lengths. Following the win, rider Tom Marquand suggested that Scandinavia was a "special horse" while Aidan O'Brien, his trainer, suggested that a tilt at the Melbourne Cup was a real possibility for the three-year-old son of Justify. With his victory in the St. Leger, not only was Scandinavia Aidan O'Brien's 9th winner of the final leg of the English Triple Crown and rider Tom Marquand's second winner of the same race, Scandinavia completed the set for sire Justify, being Justify's third English Triple Crown winner after City of Troy (horse) in the Epsom Derby and Ruling Court in the 2000 Guineas, putting his sire alongside his damsire Galileo, Frankel, and others in siring winners of each of the three English Triple Crown races.

However, the discussion of further races abroad for Scandinavia at three would prove premature. Following his run in the St. Leger, Scandinavia's connections forewent a run in the British Champions Long Distance Cup on British Champions Day for the three-year-old and forewent an earlier suggested tilt at the Melbourne Cup, ending his season after racing 5 times, earning 4 wins, twice at group 1 level, and earning £845,010.

=== 2026: Four-year-old season ===
Scandinavia began his four-year-old campaign in the Vintage Crop Stakes at Navan in Ireland. His first race back was at roughly the same distance he had won at in his last start at three, the St. Leger. Forgoing his previous usual jockeys, Tom Marquand and Wayne Lordan, Scandinavia would be ridden by Ryan Moore. Continuing his strong run of form to conclude his three-year-old year, Scandinavia won comfortably from Dallas Star by a length and a half. He followed his run in the Vintage Crop Stakes up with another strong performance, coming home half a length clear of his closest rival in the Saval Beg Stakes at Leopardstown in Ireland. His trainer, Aidan O'Brien indicated after the run that he was pleased with Scandinavia being made to work for the win at Leopardstown, saying, "This was the perfect race to bridge the gap...".

Returning to England, Scandinavia's next race was a showdown with 2025's British Champion Stayer, Trawlerman, in the Gold Cup at Ascot. The race, open to four year-old horses and older, is also known as the first race of the so-called "Stayers' Triple Crown". During the much anticipated clash, Scandinavia and Trawlerman lived up to their billing, but Scandinavia charged for the lead with a furlong to go and never looked back, defeating his older rival by a head. With the win, Scandinavia grabbed his third Group One race win and first in almost nine months since the St. Leger. Scandinavia also became the first American-bred horse since 1993 to win one of the showpieces of Ascot's Royal Meeting. Now regular jockey Ryan Moore would go on to say about his charge, "“I thought I had it and then had to go again and Trawlerman is a brave horse and kept coming, but Scandinavia keeps finding a way to win.” Echoing the words of Ryan Moore after the showdown, Aidan O'Brien reflected on Scandinavia's fight adding, "He always showed that in every race–he's relentless, he cruises." After the victory, Scandinavia was rated the best stayer in the world and the joint 12th best horse who raced in 2026, according to the Longine World's Best Racehorse Rankings.

Following the win in the Ascot Gold Cup, Scandinavia scored a second successive win in the Goodwood Cup during Glorious Goodwood, beating Trawlerman by 8 1/2 lengths, partially due to the interference of Amiloc during later stages of the race which prevented Trawlerman from running on. Despite the large margin of victory, Moore explained about Scandinavia that "He probably thinks he got beat" due to drama during the race as Amiloc unhorsed his rider and finished ahead of Scandinavia even as an official non-completer. Regardless, the large victory gave Scandinavia a second win over the previous year's British Champion Stayer, Trawlerman. Continuing the reaction, his trainer Aidan O'Brien indicated that his charge's likely next assignment would likely be the Irish St. Leger, saying "He's an unbelievable stayer ... He has a great rhythm and loves what he does. He looks exceptional".

Three months later, Scandinavia ran in the Irish St. Leger. His probable competitor for that race was Queenstown, who previously finished second in the Prix Royal Oak and won the Irish St Leger Trial Stakes beforehand. When the race began, Scandinavia sat well in the second position, mitigating Queenstown who took an early lead. He pushed the pace and wore down Queenstown in the final straight before overtaking him in the final furlong. He won the race on the line by two lengths ahead of Queenstown, stretching his winning streak to eight in a row. Aiden O'Brien labeled the horse as a great horse with an unbelievable stamina in all race phase. He also teased that the horse might join the Prix du Cadran in France two months later but insisted that the ground might be unsuitable for his running style. A month later, he did joined the race but lost the final duel against Caballo De Mar, ridden by Oisin Murphy by a short neck, in which the contention was quite controversial as both horses bumped each other before the line. Aiden O'Brien said calmly after the race that the horse performed beautifully and, due to concerns on the ground at Ascot, he declared the horse's season ended there, as he would not be joining the Champions Day.

== Race record ==
Date	Race	Distance	Course	Class (GB)	Prize (£k)	Odds	Runners	Placing	Margin	Winning time	Jockey	Ref
25 July 2024	Maiden	1m	Leopardstown		14	5/2	8	3	(4 1/4 lengths)	1:43.72	Wayne Lordan	
16 Aug 2024	Maiden	1m	Newmarket	4	8.8	2/1	9	2	(3/4 length)	1:39.43	Tom Marquand	
14 Sep 2024	Maiden	1m	Doncaster	2	49.1	11/10F	11	7	(4 3/4 lengths)	1:38.52	Wayne Lordan	
17 May 2025	Maiden	1m 2f 140y	Navan		9.4	1/2F	10	1	3 1/4 lengths	2:00.72	Wayne Lordan	
18 June 2025	Queen's Vase	1m 6f 34y	Ascot	1 (II)	260.7	16/1	13	5	(1 1/2 lengths)	2:59.53	Wayne Lordan	
10 July 2025	Bahrain Trophy	1m 5f	Newmarket	1 (III)	150.8	11/8F	5	1	8 1/2 lengths	2:42.30	Ryan Moore	
29 July 2025	Goodwood Cup	2m	Goodwood	1 (I)	491.9	4/1	8	1	3/4 length	3:27.96	Wayne Lordan	
13 Sep 2025	St Leger Stakes	1m 6f 115y	Doncaster	1 (I)	688.6	2/1F	7	1	Neck	3:04.63	Tom Marquand	
25 Apr 2026	Vintage Crop Stakes	1m 6f	Navan	1 (Listed)	42.5	11/10F	7	1	1 1/2 lengths	3:04.63	Ryan Moore	
15 May 2026	Saval Beg Stakes	1m 6f	Leopardstown	1 (III)	57	2/9F	6	1	1/2 length	3:00.93	Ryan Moore	
18 June 2026	Ascot Gold Cup	2m 3f 210y	Ascot	1 (I)	688.6	11/8F	11	1	Neck	4:18.53	Ryan Moore	
28 July 2026	Goodwood Cup	2m	Goodwood	1 (I)	491.9	6/5F	7	1	8 1/2 lengths	3:23.53	Ryan Moore	
13 Sep 2026	Irish St. Leger	1m 6f	Curragh	1 (I)	244.6	4/11F	7	1	2 lengths	2:58.18	Ryan Moore	
3 Oct 2026	Prix du Cadran	4000m	Longchamp	1 (I)	50.8	1/5F	10	2	Short Neck	4:18.94	Ryan Moore	

- Angled time did not belong to Scandinavia

== Pedigree ==
Pedigree of Scandinavia (USA) dark bay/brown 2022
Sire Justify (USA) 2015	Scat Daddy (USA); 2004	Johannesburg	Hennessy
Sire Justify (USA) 2015	Scat Daddy (USA); 2004	Johannesburg	Myth
Sire Justify (USA) 2015	Scat Daddy (USA); 2004	Love Style	Mr. Prospector*
Sire Justify (USA) 2015	Scat Daddy (USA); 2004	Love Style	Likeable Style
Sire Justify (USA) 2015	Stage Magic (USA); 2007	Ghostzapper	Awesome Again
Sire Justify (USA) 2015	Stage Magic (USA); 2007	Ghostzapper	Baby Zip
Sire Justify (USA) 2015	Stage Magic (USA); 2007	Magical Illusion	Pulpit
Sire Justify (USA) 2015	Stage Magic (USA); 2007	Magical Illusion	Voodoo Lily
Dam Fabulous (IRE) 2013	Galileo (IRE); 1998	Sadler's Wells	Northern Dancer*
Dam Fabulous (IRE) 2013	Galileo (IRE); 1998	Sadler's Wells	Fairy Bridge
Dam Fabulous (IRE) 2013	Galileo (IRE); 1998	Urban Sea	Miswaki
Dam Fabulous (IRE) 2013	Galileo (IRE); 1998	Urban Sea	Allegretta
Dam Fabulous (IRE) 2013	Mariah's Storm (USA); 1991	Rahy	Blushing Groom
Dam Fabulous (IRE) 2013	Mariah's Storm (USA); 1991	Rahy	Glorious Song
Dam Fabulous (IRE) 2013	Mariah's Storm (USA); 1991	Immense	Roberto
Dam Fabulous (IRE) 2013	Mariah's Storm (USA); 1991	Immense	Imsodear

Scandinavia is inbred 4S x 5D to Mr. Prospector, meaning he appears once in the fourth generation on the sire's side (via Love Style) and once in the fifth generation on the dam's side (via Miswaki). He is also inbred 6S 7S x 4D to Northern Dancer, meaning he appears once in the sixth generation and once in the seventh generation on the sire's side (as grandsire of Likeable Style and great-grandsire of Awesome Again) and once in the fourth generation on the dam side (as sire of Sadler's Wells, grandsire of Fabulous). Finally, he is inbred 7S 6S, both on the sire's side, to Secretariat, as Secretariat is the damsire of Hennessy's sire, Storm Cat, and the grandsire of Pulpit through Pulpit's sire A.P. Indy.
