= Royal Rebel =

British-bred Thoroughbred racehorse

- Sire: Robellino
- Grandsire: Roberto
- Dam: Greenvera
- Damsire: Riverman
- Sex: Gelding
- Foaled: 29 March 1996
- Country: United Kingdom
- Colour: Bay
- Breeder: Bloomsbury Stud
- Owner: Peter Savill
- Trainer: Mark Johnston
- Record: 39:7-5-4
- Earnings: £470,278

Major wins
- Ballycullen Stakes (1999); Saval Beg Stakes (2000); Goodwood Cup (2000); Lonsdale Stakes (2000); Ascot Gold Cup (2001, 2002)

Royal Rebel (foaled 29 March 1996) was a British Thoroughbred racehorse. A gelding who excelled over extreme distance, he is best known for winning consecutive runnings of the two and a half mile Gold Cup at Royal Ascot in 2001 and 2002. In a career which lasted from July 1998 until June 2005 he ran thirty-nine times and won seven races. Apart from the Gold Cup, he also won the Ballycullen Stakes, Saval Beg Stakes, Goodwood Cup and Lonsdale Stakes.

== Background ==
Royal Rebel is a bay gelding with a narrow white blaze and a white sock on his left hind leg bred by Lady Tavistock's Bedfordshire-based Bloomsbury Stud. He was sired by Robellino, a son of Roberto who won the Royal Lodge Stakes and sired several good winners including Mister Baileys (2000 Guineas) and Rebelline (Tattersalls Gold Cup). Royal Rebel's dam, Greenvera was a great-granddaughter of Glaneuse, a broodmare whose other descendants included Gold River and Goldikova.

As yearling, Royal Rebel was sent to the Tattersalls sales in October 1997 where he was bought for 145,000 guineas by the bloodstock agent Charlie Gordon-Watson. He entered into the ownership of Peter Savill, the chairman of the British Horseracing Board and was sent into training with Mark Johnston at Middleham, North Yorkshire.

== Racing career ==
=== 1998 and 1999: early career ===
Royal Rebel failed to win in three starts as a two-year-old but showed some promise when finishing fourth in the Group One National Stakes at the Curragh.

On his second appearance as a three-year-old, Royal Rebel recorded his first success when he won a maiden race over one mile at Newcastle Racecourse in April. After finishing second in the Ballysax Stake at Leopardstown he was moved up in class to contest the Derby Trial Stakes at Lingfield Park Racecourse and finished third to Lucido and Daliapour, five lengths clear of Fantastic Light in fourth. He finished seventh of the eight runners behind Montjeu in the Prix du Jockey Club and then finished unplaced when carrying top weight of 133 pounds in a handicap race at Goodwood. In August he was sent to race in Ireland for the third time and was matched against older horses in the Listed Ballycullen Stakes over fourteen furlongs at Leopardstown. Ridden by Johnny Murtagh he started the 9/4 favourite and won by two lengths from Try For Ever. On his final appearance of the year, Royal Rebel traveled to Sweden for the Stockholm Cup International at Täby Racecourse, where he finished unplaced behind the Norwegian-trained six-year-old Albaran.

=== 2000: four-year-old season ===
As a four-year-old, Johnston campaigned Royal Rebel over long distances and he emerged as a top-class stayer. After finishing unplaced in the Sagaro Stakes on his debut he was matched against the 1999 Ascot Gold Cup winner Enzeli in the Saval Beg Stakes over one and three-quarter miles at the Curragh. Equipped with blinkers and ridden by Mick Kinane, Royal Rebel stayed on strongly in the straight to catch Enzeli in the last stride and win by a short head in what the Irish Independent described as a "gripping finish". The gelding continued to campaign in Ireland that summer finishing second in both the Group Three Curragh Cup and the Listed Challenge Stakes at Leopardstown.

Royal Rebel returned to England for the Goodwood Cup over two miles on 3 August. Starting at odds of 10/1 in a field of eight runners he got the better of a sustained struggle with the favourite Far Cry to win by half a length with Persian Punch in fifth place. After the race, which had been preceded by a violent thunderstorm, Johnston described the winner as "a lazy horse who's had so many off days that you can never be sure how he will run. But he's never been better than today, and he got the perfect ride from Mick Kinane". Nineteen days later at York Racecourse Royal Rebel won his second consecutive Group race as he overcame interference in the straight to win the Lonsdale Stakes by a short head from Rainbow High. The gelding failed to win in his remaining three races but showed good form when finishing third to San Sebastian in the Group One Prix du Cadran and second to Persian Punch in the Jockey Club Cup.

=== 2001: five-year-old season ===
Royal Rebel's form in the spring of 2001 was unimpressive as he finished unplaced in both the Yorkshire Cup (behind Marienbard) and the Henry II Stakes at Sandown. His next race was the Gold Cup over two and a half miles at Royal Ascot. In front of a crowd of over 72,000 he started at odds of 8/1 in a field which included Marienbard, San Sebastian, Persian Punch, Rainbow High and Yavana's Pace. Kevin Darley who had ridden the gelding at Sandown felt that Royal Rebel resented wearing blinkers and Johnston decided to remove the headgear for the Ascot race. Ridden by Johnny Murtagh, Royal Rebel was positioned just behind the leaders before moving up to join the leader Persian Punch two furlongs from the finish. The two geldings drew clear of the field and raced side by side throughout the closing stages before Royal Rebel prevailed by a head.

Royal Rebel failed to recover his Gold Cup-winning form in five subsequent races in 2001. He finished unplaced behind Persian Punch in the Goodwood Cup and the Lonsdale Stakes and was again unplaced in the Doncaster Cup. He finished a remote fourth behind Germinis in the Prix du Cadran and then produced a rather better performance when running a close third in the Jockey Club Cup.

=== 2002: six-year-old season ===
As in the previous year, Royal Rebel showed little worthwhile form in the spring of 2002, finishing fifteenth under a weight of 141 pounds in the Chester Cup and eighth in the Henry II Stakes. On 20 June, the gelding attempted to win a second Gold Cup at Ascot. After seven consecutive defeats he was given little chance, and started a 16/1 outsider in a field of fifteen runners, with the Irish gelding Vinnie Roe being made the 5/2 favourite. Royal Rebel appeared to be under pressure from the start, but made good progress to take the lead early in the straight. In the final furlong he was overtaken by Vinnie Roe and Wareed but rallied strongly in the closing stages to regain the advantage and win by a neck. After the race, Johnston commented "It's just fantastic. I've said for quite a while not to discount him because the horse has been physically very well. You'd have to say it was a different Royal Rebel today, probably the best we've seen him in many years really. It's the first time I've seen the horse switched on in a while and I knew if he could go well for the first four furlongs he would take a lot of beating at the end of two and a half miles." Johnny Murtagh said: "He has the heart of a lion. Once he got a chance to rally back (at Vinnie Roe and Wareed), he gave 110%".

=== 2003–2005: later career ===
Royal Rebel missed the whole of the 2003 season with tendon injuries before returning as an eight-year-old in 2004. He ran six times without success including a fourth place behind Papineau in the Gold Cup. His best effort came on 29 July when he finished second to Darasim in the Goodwood Cup.

The gelding remained in training as a nine-year-old in 2005 but was well-beaten in both his races and was retired after finishing unplaced in the Queen Alexandra Stakes, run that year at York. Johnston said that "It wasn't the end we had hoped for, but we've got some great memories. I under-estimated him when he won his first Gold Cup. I thought it must have been a weak Gold Cup, but he won it again the following year beating Vinnie Roe and there aren't many horses that win it twice. He was a great horse and had a lot of class all his life."

== Retirement ==
Following his last race, Royal Rebel was sent to spend his retirement at Savill's stud in Ireland.

== Pedigree ==
Pedigree of Royal Rebel (GB), bay gelding, 1996
Sire Robellino (USA) 1978	Roberto (USA); 1969	Hail to Reason	Turn-To
Sire Robellino (USA) 1978	Roberto (USA); 1969	Hail to Reason	Nothirdchance
Sire Robellino (USA) 1978	Roberto (USA); 1969	Bramalea	Nashua
Sire Robellino (USA) 1978	Roberto (USA); 1969	Bramalea	Rarelea
Sire Robellino (USA) 1978	Isobelline (USA); 1971	Pronto	Timor
Sire Robellino (USA) 1978	Isobelline (USA); 1971	Pronto	Proserpina
Sire Robellino (USA) 1978	Isobelline (USA); 1971	Isobella	Bold Ruler
Sire Robellino (USA) 1978	Isobelline (USA); 1971	Isobella	Monarchy
Dam Greenvera (USA) 1989	Riverman (USA); 1969	Never Bend	Nasrullah
Dam Greenvera (USA) 1989	Riverman (USA); 1969	Never Bend	Lalun
Dam Greenvera (USA) 1989	Riverman (USA); 1969	River Lady	Prince John
Dam Greenvera (USA) 1989	Riverman (USA); 1969	River Lady	Nile Lily
Dam Greenvera (USA) 1989	Greenway (FR); 1978	Targowice	Round Table
Dam Greenvera (USA) 1989	Greenway (FR); 1978	Targowice	Matriarch
Dam Greenvera (USA) 1989	Greenway (FR); 1978	Gracious	Habitat
Dam Greenvera (USA) 1989	Greenway (FR); 1978	Gracious	Glaneuse (Family:22-d)
