= Fame and Glory =

Irish Thoroughbred racehorse

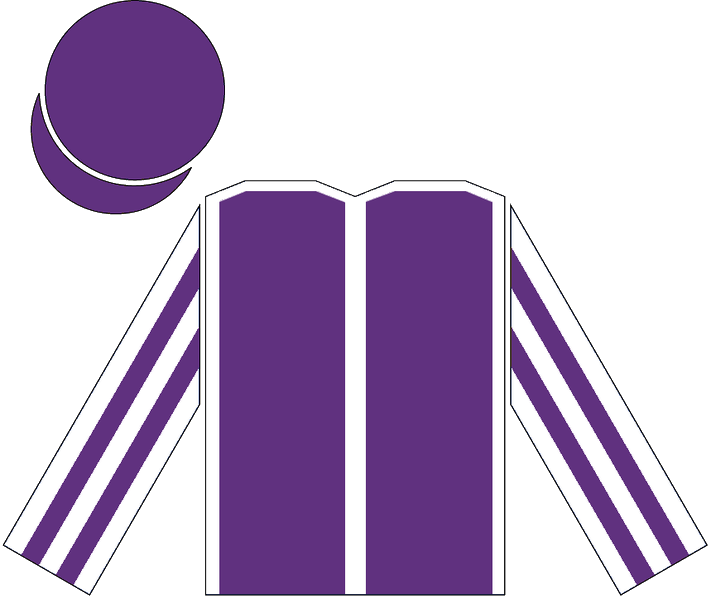
- Racing silks of Derrick Smith
- Sire: Montjeu
- Grandsire: Sadler's Wells
- Dam: Gryada
- Damsire: Shirley Heights
- Sex: Stallion
- Foaled: 20 March 2006
- Died: 13 February 2017 (aged 10)
- Country: Ireland
- Colour: Bay
- Breeder: Ptarmigan Bloodstock & Miss Kirsten Rausing
- Owner: Derrick Smith & Sue Magnier & Michael Tabor
- Trainer: Aidan O'Brien
- Record: 26: 14-3-1
- Earnings: £2,314,119

Major wins
- Critérium de Saint-Cloud (2008); Ballysax Stakes (2009); Derrinstown Stud Derby Trial (2009); Irish Derby Stakes (2009); Mooresbridge Stakes (2010); Tattersalls Gold Cup (2010); Coronation Cup (2010); Royal Whip Stakes (2010); Vintage Crop Stakes (2011, 2012); Saval Beg Stakes (2011); Ascot Gold Cup (2011); British Champions Long Distance Cup (2011)

Awards
- European Champion Stayer (2011)

Fame and Glory (20 March 2006 – 13 February 2017) was an Irish Thoroughbred horse whose wins include the Critérium de Saint-Cloud, Irish Derby, Tattersalls Gold Cup, Coronation Cup and Ascot Gold Cup.

== Background ==
Fame and Glory was a bay horse bred by the Coolmore Stud. He was sired by the Prix de l'Arc de Triomphe winner Montjeu. During his racing career he was registered as being owned by Derrick Smith, Sue Magnier, Michael Tabor and Mrs F Hay. He was trained at Ballydoyle by Aidan O'Brien.

== Racing career ==
=== 2008: two-year-old season ===
Fame and Glory began his racing career by winning a maiden race at Navan Racecourse on 22 October 2008. He was then sent to France and moved up markedly in class to contest the Group One Critérium de Saint-Cloud. Racing over 2000 metres on heavy ground he was ridden by Johnny Murtagh and won by half a length from his stable companion Drumbeat.

=== 2009: three-year-old season ===
At three, he went to Epsom via the same route as the previous stablemate Derby winner Galileo and High Chaparral, winning the Ballysax Stakes and Derrinstown Stud Derby Trial in Ireland. He ran second behind Sea the Stars in The Derby.

In June 2009, the horse won the Irish Derby, the 8-11 favourite, ridden by Johnny Murtagh, took up the running from stablemate Golden Sword (11-1) with 300m to go and won by five lengths. He then ran second behind Sea the Stars in the Irish Champion Stakes before finishing unplaced in the Prix de l'Arc de Triomphe and Champion Stakes.

=== 2010: four-year-old season ===
Fame And Glory's 2010 campaign saw two further Group One victories in the Tattersalls Gold Cup and the Coronation Cup, with his season finishing with an unplaced run in the Arc.

=== 2011: five-year-old season ===
Set on a staying campaign in 2011, his first two runs resulted in victories in the Vintage Crop Stakes and Saval Beg Stakes. Following these performances he was sent off 11/8 favourite for the Ascot Gold Cup, and duly won by three lengths.

=== 2012: six-year-old season ===
Fame and Glory began his six-year-old season with a win in the Listed Vintage Crop Stakes at Navan, but his subsequent efforts were disappointing. He finished unplaced in the Ascot Gold Cup, Irish St Leger and British Champions' Long Distance Cup and was pulled up in the Breeders' Cup Marathon.

== Stud career and death ==
At the end of his racing career Fame and Glory was retired to become a breeding stallion at the Grange Stud. He died in February 2017 after suffering a suspected heart attack while covering a mare.

== Pedigree ==
Pedigree of Fame and Glory (IRE), bay stallion, 2006
Sire Montjeu (IRE) 1996	Sadler's Wells (USA); 1981	Northern Dancer	Nearctic
Sire Montjeu (IRE) 1996	Sadler's Wells (USA); 1981	Northern Dancer	Natalma
Sire Montjeu (IRE) 1996	Sadler's Wells (USA); 1981	Fairy Bridge	Bold Reason
Sire Montjeu (IRE) 1996	Sadler's Wells (USA); 1981	Fairy Bridge	Special
Sire Montjeu (IRE) 1996	Floripedes (FR); 1985	Top Ville	High Top
Sire Montjeu (IRE) 1996	Floripedes (FR); 1985	Top Ville	Sega Ville
Sire Montjeu (IRE) 1996	Floripedes (FR); 1985	Toute Cy	Tennyson
Sire Montjeu (IRE) 1996	Floripedes (FR); 1985	Toute Cy	Adele Toumignon
Dam Gryada (GB) 1993	Shirley Heights (GB); 1975	Mill Reef	Never Bend
Dam Gryada (GB) 1993	Shirley Heights (GB); 1975	Mill Reef	Milan Mill
Dam Gryada (GB) 1993	Shirley Heights (GB); 1975	Hardiemma	Hardicanute
Dam Gryada (GB) 1993	Shirley Heights (GB); 1975	Hardiemma	Grand Cross
Dam Gryada (GB) 1993	Grimpola (GER); 1982	Windwurf	Kaiseradler
Dam Gryada (GB) 1993	Grimpola (GER); 1982	Windwurf	Wiesenweihe
Dam Gryada (GB) 1993	Grimpola (GER); 1982	Gondel	Zank
Dam Gryada (GB) 1993	Grimpola (GER); 1982	Gondel	Goldhenne (Family: 1-i)
