= Saval Beg Stakes =

Flat horse race in Ireland

- Class: Group 3
- Location: Leopardstown; County Dublin, Ireland
- Race type: Flat / Thoroughbred
- Sponsor: McGrath family
- Website: Leopardstown

Race information
- Distance: 1m 6f (2,816 metres)
- Surface: Turf
- Track: Left-handed
- Qualification: Four-years-old and up
- Weight: 9 st 7 lb Allowances; 5 lb for fillies and mares Penalties; 7 lb for G1 / G2 winners 5 lb for G3 winners 3 lb for Listed winners since June 1 last year
- Purse: €45,500 (2022); 1st: €29,500

Saval Beg Stakes
2026
Scandinavia	Happy Pharoah	Le Destrier

Previous years
2025
Kyprios	Dallas Star	Satin
2024
Kyprios	Queenstown	Yashin
2023
Yashin	Point King	Dawn Rising
2022
Kyprios	Sunchart	Agitare
2021
Emperor Of The Sun	Search For A Song	Twilight Payment

2020-2011
2020
Nickajack Cave	Twilight Payment	Falcon Eight
2019
Twilight Payment	Falcon Eight	Capri
2018
Order Of St George	Twilight Payment	Remarkable Lady
2017
Order Of St George	Twilight Payment	Motherland
2016
Order Of St George	Fact Or Folklore	Modem
2015
Kingfisher	Panama Hat	Drifting Mist
2014
Missunited	Shu Lewis	Tarana
2013
Pale Mimosa	Missunited	El Salvador
2012
Midnight Soprano	Saddler's Rock	Unaccompanied
2011
Fame And Glory	Vivacious Vivienne	Rite Of Passage

2010-2003
2010
Profound Beauty	Age Of Aquarius	Caesar's Song
2009
Hindu Kush	Alandi	Sublimity
2008
Ezima	Hasanka	Merveilles
2007
Yeats	Mutakarrim	King In Waiting
2006
Media Puzzle	Good Surprise	Mkuzi
2005
Vinnie Roe	Mutakarrim	Mkuzi
2004
Windermere	Vinnie Roe	My Renee
2003
Queen Astrid	Mutakarrim	Crimphill

The Saval Beg Stakes is a Group 3 flat horse race in Ireland open to thoroughbreds aged four years or older. It is run at Leopardstown over a distance of 1 mile and 6 furlongs (2,816 metres), and it is scheduled to take place each year in late May or early June.

The race was formerly contested over a distance of 2 miles. It was cut to 1 mile and 5 furlongs in 1991, and its present length was introduced in 1992.

The minimum age of participating horses was lowered from four to three in 1993, but the previous age restriction was restored in 2006. The race is currently sponsored by the McGrath family and carries the name of Levmoss, a champion racehorse owned by Seamus McGrath.

From 2022, the Saval Beg Stakes promoted to Group 3 while Irish Stayer races reform.

== Records ==
Most successful horse since 1988 (3 wins):

- Order of St George - 2016, 2017, 2018
- Kyprios - 2022, 2024, 2025

Leading jockey since 1988 (6 wins):

- Ryan Moore - Order of St George (2017, 2018), Kyrpios (2022, 2024, 2025), Scandinavia (2026)

Leading trainer since 1988 (10 wins):

- Aidan O'Brien - Yeats (2007), Fame and Glory (2011), Kingfisher (2015), Order of St George (2016, 2017, 2018), Kyrpios (2022, 2024, 2025), Scandinavia (2026)

== Winners since 1988 ==
Year	Winner	Age	Jockey	Trainer	Time
1988	Shannon Spray	7	Donal Manning	Augustine Leahy	3:42.70
1989	Oremus	5	Stephen Craine	Ted Curtin	3:41.00
1990	Prime Display	4	Stephen Craine	Paul Cole	3:44.90
1991	Coolcullen	9	Christy Roche	Jim Bolger	2:50.70
1992	Sleet Skier	5	Michael Kinane	Dermot Weld	3:05.60
1993	Garabagh	4	Johnny Murtagh	John Oxx	3:21.70
1994	Vintage Crop	7	Michael Kinane	Dermot Weld	3:05.30
1995	Mohaajir	4	Kevin Manning	Jim Bolger	3:09.00
1996	Humbel	4	Michael Kinane	Dermot Weld	3:05.90
1997	French Ballerina	4	Seamie Heffernan	Pat Flynn	3:04.70
1998	French Ballerina	5	Seamie Heffernan	Pat Flynn	2:59.30
1999	Enzeli	4	Johnny Murtagh	John Oxx	3:01.30
2000	Royal Rebel	4	Michael Kinane	Mark Johnston	2:57.10
2001	Rostropovich	4	David Casey	Mouse Morris	3:05.70
2002	Vinnie Roe	4	Pat Smullen	Dermot Weld	3:20.50
2003	Queen Astrid	3	Helen Keohane	Liam Browne	3:12.50
2004	Windermere	5	Johnny Murtagh	Ted Walsh	3:02.20
2005	Vinnie Roe	7	Pat Smullen	Dermot Weld	3:00.80
2006	Media Puzzle	9	Pat Smullen	Dermot Weld	2:57.80
2007	Yeats	6	Seamie Heffernan	Aidan O'Brien	2:58.80
2008	Ezima	4	Kevin Manning	Jim Bolger	3:08.30
2009	Hindu Kush	4	Chris Hayes	David Nicholls	3:04.52
2010	Profound Beauty	6	Pat Smullen	Dermot Weld	2:58.64
2011	Fame and Glory	5	Jamie Spencer	Aidan O'Brien	2:58.66
2012	Midnight Soprano	5	Chris Hayes	Paul Deegan	3:20.35
2013	Pale Mimosa	4	Pat Smullen	Dermot Weld	2:54.81
2014	Missunited	7	Kevin Manning	Michael Winters	3:02.99
2015	Kingfisher	4	Donnacha O'Brien	Aidan O'Brien	3:03.01
2016	Order of St George	4	Donnacha O'Brien	Aidan O'Brien	3:00.99
2017	Order of St George	5	Ryan Moore	Aidan O'Brien	3:03.28
2018	Order of St George	6	Ryan Moore	Aidan O'Brien	3:02.50
2019	Twilight Payment	6	Kevin Manning	Jim Bolger	3:05.15
2020	Nickajack Cave (Note: The 2020 race was run in June due to the COVID-19 pandemic in the Republic of Ireland)	4	Colin Keane	Ger Lyons	2:59.19
2021	Emperor of the Sun	4	Gavin Ryan	Donnacha O'Brien	3:04.86
2022	Kyprios	4	Ryan Moore	Aidan O'Brien	3:02.04
2023	Yashin	4	Shane Foley	Jessica Harrington	3:03.40
2024	Kyprios	6	Ryan Moore	Aidan O'Brien	3:01.16
2025	Kyprios	7	Ryan Moore	Aidan O'Brien	3:03.22
2026	Scandinavia	4	Ryan Moore	Aidan O'Brien	3:03.93

== See also ==
- Horse racing in Ireland
- List of Irish flat horse races
