= Kyprios (horse) =

Irish Thoroughbred racehorse

- Sire: Galileo
- Grandsire: Sadler's Wells
- Dam: Polished Gem
- Damsire: Danehill
- Sex: Stallion
- Foaled: 18 May 2018
- Country: Ireland
- Color: Chestnut
- Breeder: Moyglare Stud
- Owner: Moyglare Stud, Michael Tabor, Susan Magnier & Westerberg
- Trainer: Aidan O'Brien
- Record: 21: 17-2-0
- Earnings: £2,690,414

Major wins
- Vintage Crop Stakes (2022, 2024, 2025); Saval Beg Stakes (2022, 2024, 2025); Ascot Gold Cup (2022, 2024); Goodwood Cup (2022, 2024); Irish St. Leger (2022, 2024); Prix du Cadran (2022, 2024); Long Distance Cup (2024); Timeform rating: 131
- Last updated on 27 May 2025

Kyprios (foaled 18 May 2018) is a retired Irish Thoroughbred racehorse. He was lightly raced in his early career, winning one race from two starts in each of his first two seasons. As a four-year-old in 2022 he emerged as a top-class stayer, winning the Vintage Crop Stakes and Saval Beg Stakes in Ireland before taking the Ascot Gold Cup, Goodwood Cup, Irish St. Leger and Prix du Cadran. He missed most of the 2023 season due to injury but won all his seven starts in 2024, including the Ascot Gold Cup, Goodwood Cup, Irish St. Leger and Prix du Cadran. After winning his two starts in April and May 2025, he was retired due to a recurrence of his old injury. He had won 17 of his 20 starts, including eight Group 1 races. He was ridden in all but two of his races by Ryan Moore. In 2022 and 2024 he was crowned European top stayer of the year at the Cartier Racing Awards.

== Background ==
Kyprios is a chestnut horse with a narrow white blaze and two white socks bred by the Moyglare Stud. He races in the ownership of Moyglare Stud in partnership with Coolmore Stud's Michael Tabor and Susan Magnier. In 2022 the horse's ownership team was joined by Georg von Opel. The colt was sent into training with Aidan O'Brien at Ballydoyle.

He was from the sixteenth crop of foals sired by Galileo, who won the Derby, Irish Derby and King George VI and Queen Elizabeth Stakes in 2001. His other progeny include Australia, Frankel, Waldgeist, Nathaniel, New Approach, Rip Van Winkle, Found, Minding and Ruler of the World. Kyprios's dam, Polished Gem won one minor race from five attempts, but has been a very successful broodmare, producing several other winners including Search For A Song, Free Eagle, Sapphire (British Champions Fillies and Mares Stakes) and Custom Cut (Sandown Mile). Polished Gem is a daughter of the Irish 1,000 Guineas winner Trusted Partner.

== Racing career ==
=== 2020: two-year-old season ===
Kyprios began his racing career in an eight and a half furlong maiden race on heavy ground at Galway Racecourse on 8 September when he started at odds of 9/4 in a seven-runner field. Ridden by Seamie Heffernan he settled just behind the leaders before producing a sustained late run to take the lead in the final strides and win by three quarters of a length from Lifetime Legend. A month later the colt was sent to England and moved up sharply in class to contest the Group 3 Zetland Stakes over ten furlongs at Newmarket Racecourse. With Moore in the saddle he started favourite but never looked likely to win and came home sixth of the eight runners behind Lone Eagle, beaten more than sixteen lengths by the winner.

=== 2021: three-year-old season ===
On 23 April Kyprios began his second season in the Blackwater Race over ten furlongs at Cork Racecourse when he was ridden by Heffernan and started the 15/2 fourth choice in a six-runner field. In a rough race, Kyprios hung to the right in the straight, recovered after being bumped by a rival, gained the advantage a furlong out and won by half a length from O'Reilly. Moore, who would ride Kyprios in all his subsequent races, was in the saddle two weeks later when the colt was sent to England for a second time and started 7/2 second favourite for the Novibet Derby Trial Stakes over one and a half miles at Lingfield Park. He was in contention for most of the way but faded in the closing stages and finished fourth, ten lengths behind the winner Third Realm.

Kyprios was sent to Royal Ascot to contest the Queen's Vase over fourteen furlongs but was withdrawn from the race after becoming distressed and breaking out of the starting stalls. He sustained bad bruising to his back and missed the rest of the season.

=== 2022: four-year-old season ===
Kyprios began his third campaign in the Listed Vintage Crop Stakes over fourteen furlongs at Navan Racecourse on 23 April when he was ridden by Moore and started the 5/1 second favourite behind his older sister Search For A Song in a nine-runner field which also included Baron Samedi (Belmont Gold Cup Stakes) and Leo De Fury (Mooresbridge Stakes). Kyprios settled in second place behind the pacemaker Effernock Fizz before taking the lead inside the last quarter mile and after repelling a challenge from Search For A Song he drew away in the closing stages to beat his sister into second place by two and three quarter lengths. After the race O'Brien said: “We always thought he was going to be very nice. He went to Ascot last year and jumped out under the stalls and he hasn’t run since then. He looks like a stayer with a bit of class, he relished that trip. We liked him a lot last year and he has done well since then. He relaxes and he quickens."

On 13 May only three horses appeared to oppose Kyprios when he started at odd of 1/10 for the Group 3 Saval Beg Stakes over fourteen furlongs at Leopardstown Racecourse. With Moore in the saddle he led from the start, drew away in the last quarter mile and won by fourteen lengths from the five-year-old Sunchart. O'Brien's representative Chris Armstrong commented "Aidan is very happy with him. He’s progressing nicely this year and has stepped up again from his last run. It was always the plan to go Navan, then here for the Saval Beg and head on to the Gold Cup at Ascot. It’s a tried and tested route so hopefully he follows in the footsteps and fingers crossed the next stop will be Ascot... His last furlong was probably his best. He was out in front and probably a bit idle but he really stretched in the last furlong."

The 2022 edition of the Ascot Gold Cup was run over two and a half miles on good to firm ground at Royal Ascot on 16 June and Kyprios, ridden by Moore, started the 13/8 favourite. His eight opponents were headed by Stradivarius and also included Princess Zoe, Mojo Star (runner-up in the Epsom Derby), Burning Victory (Triumph Hurdle) and Bubble Smart (Prix Gladiateur). Kyprios settled in mid-division as the outsiders Earlofthecotswolds and Tashkhan set the pace, before moving to the outside and making progress approaching the final turn. He took the lead two furlongs from the finish and fought off a sustained challenge from Mojo Star to win by half a length, with Stradivarius a further three quarters of a length back in third place. Aidan O'Brien said "We think he's a horse who is going to come forward again. He's brave, genuine and a great horse. Ryan gave him a marvellous ride and had belief in him. When he really wanted him, he answered." Moore said that the horse had not been suited by the slow pace commenting "It wasn't a nice race to ride. I didn't like the spot we were in as we were going slow. They were getting an easy time up front and I had to move him to the outside – I don't like doing that. We got going and got to the front, and when Mojo Star has come to us, that's when he's clicked in. It wasn't a true test today but he was much the best and there will be lots of good days with him."

Kyprios followed up his success with victory in the Group I Goodwood Cup in July, once again seeing off a hard-charging Stradivarius in a close finish. In September he won the Irish St. Leger at the Curragh. His final race of the season was the Prix du Cadran at Longchamp, which he won by 20 lengths in spite of veering across the track in the final stages. In November 2022, he received the Cartier Racing Award for European top stayer of the year.

== 2023: five-year-old season ==
Kyprios missed most of the 2023 season due to a fetlock injury. He returned to the racecourse in September to defend his title in the Irish St. Leger but was beaten three-and-a-half lengths into second place by Eldar Eldarov. In his second and final outing of the season he ran in the Long Distance Cup and was narrowly beaten into second place by Trawlerman.

== 2024: six-year-old season ==
Kyprios was unbeaten in his seven starts in 2024. As in 2022, he began the season with victories in the Vintage Crop Stakes and Saval Beg Stakes. He then sought to regain his title in the Ascot Gold Cup. He won the race, beating Trawlerman by a length, and became the first horse since Kayf Tara in 2000 to regain the Ascot Gold Cup. He then regained the Goodwood Cup, the Irish St. Leger and the Prix du Cadran. The season ended with victory in the Long Distance Cup. After the race, O'Brien talked about the remarkable recovery Kyprios had made from injury: "I didn't think he'd be back. He was only able to walk on three legs and we thought the best case scenario was saving him for stud. He was an incredible horse before he got injured and it was incredible that he came back. He lives outside our back door and he's very special." In November 2024, he won the Cartier award for top stayer for a second time.

== 2025: seven-year-old season and retirement ==
In 2025, Kyprios again started the season with winning runs in the Vintage Crop Stakes and Saval Beg Stakes in preparation for the Ascot Gold Cup. After the Saval Beg Stakes, he was found to be slightly lame due to a flare up of his old injury and eleven days later, on 27 May, his owners announced his retirement. His trainer said: "Kyprios was just the most incredible horse. Obviously, we had to be ultra-respectful of him. Always. When he was a little bit sore after his run at Leopardstown, we were never going to take any risks with him. Everybody felt the same way." He had won 17 of his 21 starts, including eight Group 1 races, and had been unbeaten in nine starts since October 2023.

== Pedigree ==
Pedigree of Kyprios (IRE), chestnut stallion, 2018
Sire Galileo (IRE) 1998	Sadler's Wells (USA); 1981	Northern Dancer (CAN)	Nearctic
Sire Galileo (IRE) 1998	Sadler's Wells (USA); 1981	Northern Dancer (CAN)	Natalma (USA)
Sire Galileo (IRE) 1998	Sadler's Wells (USA); 1981	Fairy Bridge	Bold Reason
Sire Galileo (IRE) 1998	Sadler's Wells (USA); 1981	Fairy Bridge	Special
Sire Galileo (IRE) 1998	Urban Sea (USA); 1989	Miswaki	Mr. Prospector
Sire Galileo (IRE) 1998	Urban Sea (USA); 1989	Miswaki	Hopespringseternal
Sire Galileo (IRE) 1998	Urban Sea (USA); 1989	Allegretta (GB)	Lombard (GER)
Sire Galileo (IRE) 1998	Urban Sea (USA); 1989	Allegretta (GB)	Anatevka (GER)
Dam Polished Gem (IRE) 2003	Danehill (USA); 1986	Danzig	Northern Dancer (CAN)
Dam Polished Gem (IRE) 2003	Danehill (USA); 1986	Danzig	Pas De Nom
Dam Polished Gem (IRE) 2003	Danehill (USA); 1986	Razyana	His Majesty
Dam Polished Gem (IRE) 2003	Danehill (USA); 1986	Razyana	Spring Adieu (CAN)
Dam Polished Gem (IRE) 2003	Trusted Partner (USA); 1985	Affirmed	Exclusive Native
Dam Polished Gem (IRE) 2003	Trusted Partner (USA); 1985	Affirmed	Wont Tell You
Dam Polished Gem (IRE) 2003	Trusted Partner (USA); 1985	Talking Picture	Speak John
Dam Polished Gem (IRE) 2003	Trusted Partner (USA); 1985	Talking Picture	Poster Girl (Family: 9-f)

- Kyprios is inbred 3 × 4 to Northern Dancer, meaning that this stallion appears once in the third generation and once in the fourth generation of his pedigree.
