= Vintage Crop =

British-bred Thoroughbred racehorse

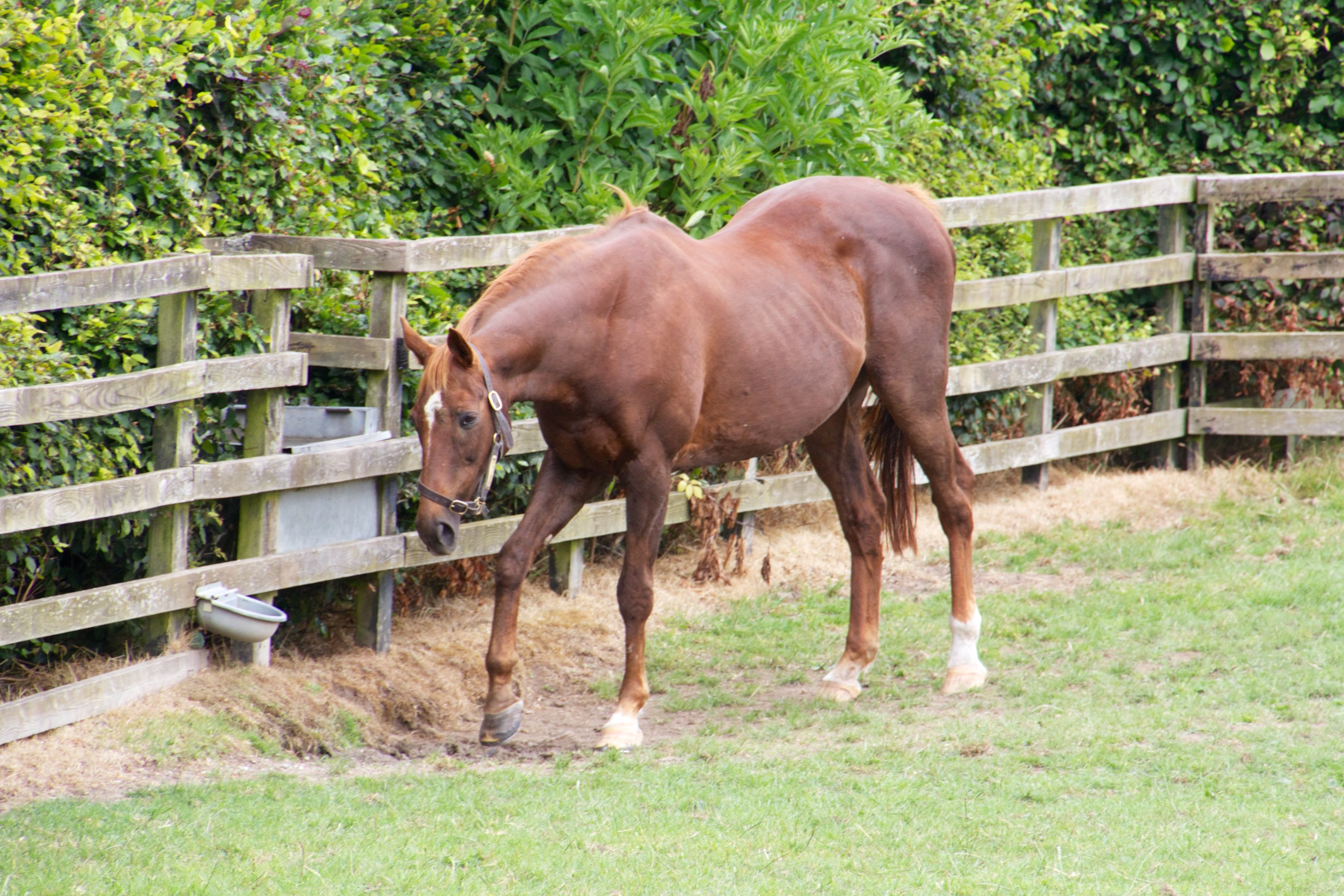
- Vintage Crop at the National Stud in 2013.
- Sire: Rousillon
- Grandsire: Riverman
- Dam: Overplay
- Damsire: Bustino
- Sex: Gelding
- Foaled: 1 March 1987
- Died: 14 July 2014 (aged 27)
- Country: United Kingdom
- Colour: Chestnut
- Breeder: Bertram & Diana Firestone
- Owner: Dr. Michael Smurfit
- Trainer: Dermot Weld
- Record: 28: 16-3-3
- Earnings: £1,065,808

Major wins
- Cesarewitch Handicap (1992); Curragh Cup (1993, 1995); Irish St. Leger (1993, 1994); Melbourne Cup (1993); Saval Beg Stakes (1994); Ballycullen Stakes (1995)

Awards
- Cartier Champion Stayer (1993)

Honours
- Life-size statue at Curragh Racecourse; Vintage Crop Stakes at Navan Racecourse
- Last updated on 22 May 2014

Vintage Crop (1 March 1987 – 14 July 2014) was a British-bred Irish-trained Thoroughbred racehorse best known for becoming the first northern hemisphere trained runner to win Australia's premier race the Melbourne Cup. The chestnut gelding competed in flat racing in Ireland, England, and Australia from 1992 to 1995. He won 16 races in Ireland, England, and Australia. For his performance during the 1993 racing season he earned the Cartier Award for Top Stayer.

Vintage Crop also won international fame in 1993 by becoming the first northern hemisphere-trained horse to win the Melbourne Cup. He is commemorated by a statue in the Curragh Racecourse. He returned to Australia for the 1994 and 1995 Melbourne Cups, where he finished seventh and third, respectively.

Vintage Crop was trained by Dermot Weld, who returned to Australia in 2002 and again won the Melbourne Cup with the Irish horse Media Puzzle.

== Background ==
Vintage Crop was a chestnut gelding with a white star and three white socks bred in the United Kingdom by Bertram and Diana Firestone. He was from the first crop of foals sired by Rousillon an American stallion who raced in Europe, winning the Queen Anne Stakes, Sussex Stakes and Prix du Moulin in 1985. The best of his other offspring included the double Eddie Read Handicap winner Fastness and the Challenge Stakes winner Sally Rous. Vintage Crop's dam Overplay won two minor races and finished third in the Ribblesdale Stakes in 1981. Vintage Crop entered the ownership of Michael Smurfit and was sent into training with Dermot Weld at the Curragh.

== Racing career ==
=== Early career ===
Vintage Crop began his racing career by winning a two-mile flat race at Thurles Racecourse in October 1991 and was then campaigned in National Hunt races, winning two novice hurdles in December. He returned to the flat in 1992, winning handicap races at Gowran Park and Tralee and finishing fifth to Mashaallah when moved up in class for the Group One Irish St. Leger at the Curragh Racecourse. In October he was sent to England to contest the Cesarewitch Handicap over two and a quarter miles at Newmarket Racecourse. Carrying a weight of 132 pounds he took the lead a quarter of a mile from the finish and drew away to win by eight lengths.

=== 1993: six-year-old season ===
In 1993, Vintage Crop made a brief return to hurdling to finish sixth to Granville Again in the Champion Hurdle at Cheltenham Racecourse before being aimed at long distance races on the flat. He won a minor race at Leopardstown Racecourse and the Listed Curragh Cup as well as being placed in the Saval Beg Stakes and the Meld Stakes and finishing sixth in the Ascot Gold Cup. On 18 September, the gelding ran for the second time in the Irish St Leger and started at odds of 9/2 against a field which included Drum Taps and Snurge. Ridden by Mick Kinane, he took the lead approaching the final quarter-mile and won by two and a half lengths from Assessor. Vintage Crop was then sent to Australia in an attempt to become the first foreign-trained horse to win the Melbourne Cup. Ridden again by Kinane, the Irish gelding produced a strong run in the straight to overtake Te Akau Nick in the closing stages and win going away by three lengths. The unplaced horses included Subzero, The Phantom and Drum Taps.

=== Later career ===
In 1994 Vintage Crop won the Saval Beg Stakes and finished three-quarters of a length second to Arcadian Heights in the Ascot Gold Cup. After finishing second in the Curragh Cup and winning a minor race at the Curragh, he started 7/4 favourite for the Irish St Leger in September. He took the race for the second time, beating Rayseka by three lengths with the British challenger Bob's Return in fifth. In the 1994 Melbourne Cup, Vintage Crop carried top weight and finished seventh of the twenty-four runners behind the Australian trained Jeune.

As an eight-year-old, Vintage Crop won a minor race at Leopardstown, finished fourth to Double Trigger in the Ascot Gold Cup and then won the Curragh Cup for the second time. He then won the Listed Ballycullen Stakes before finishing fourth behind Strategic Choice, Moonax and Oscar Schindler in the Irish St. Leger. On his final racecourse appearance, Vintage Crop finished third behind Doriemus and Nothin' Leica Dane in the 1995 Melbourne Cup.

== Retirement ==
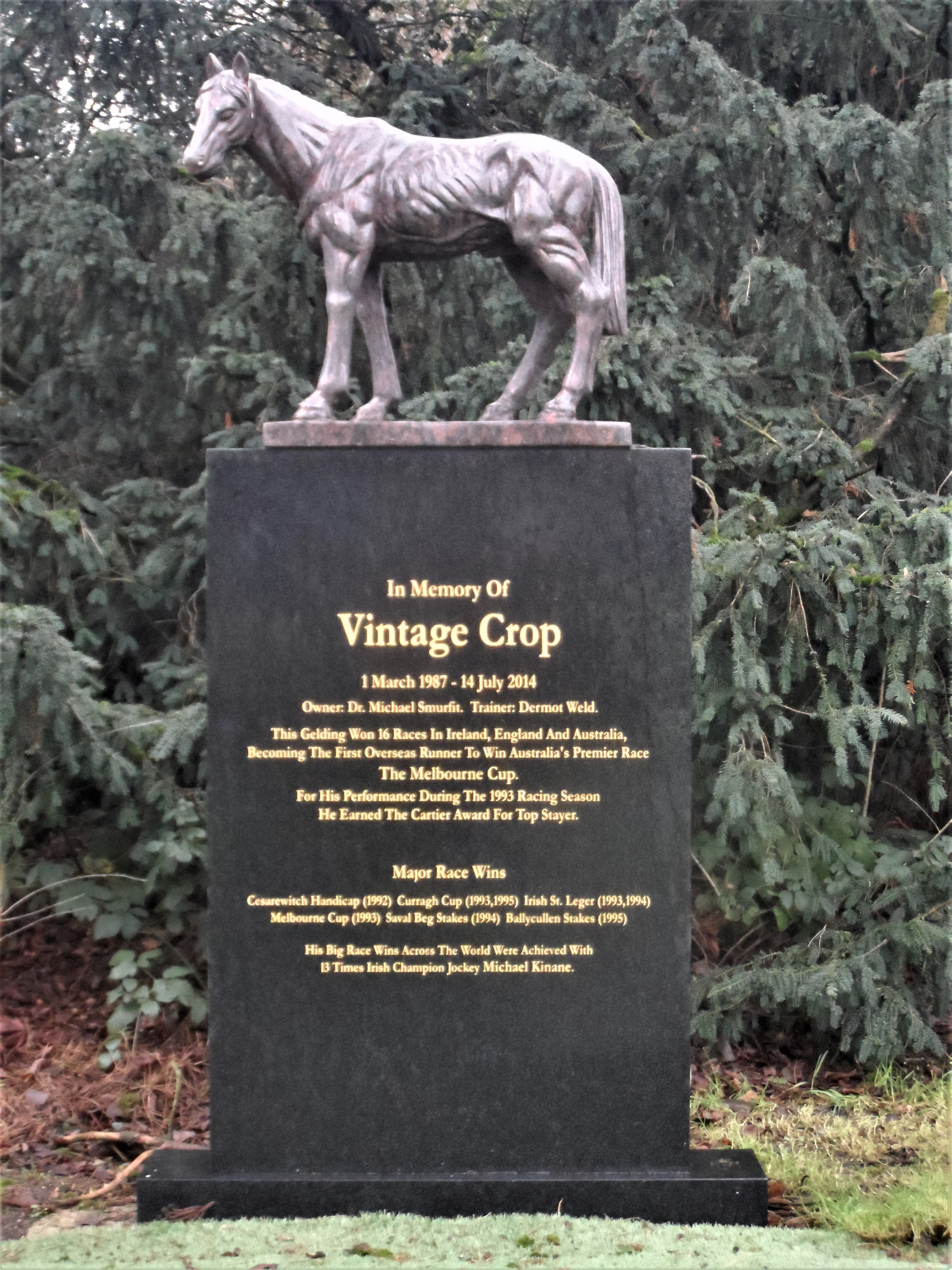
Vintage Crop's grave

Vintage Crop retired at the Irish National Stud in Kildare and could be visited by the public as part of the stud's Living Legends exhibit, alongside Kicking King, Beef Or Salmon and Moscow Flyer. He died at the Irish National Stud on 14 July 2014 at the age of twenty-seven. He was buried on the K Club golf course, with a substantial grave marker.

== Pedigree ==
Pedigree of Vintage Crop (GB), chestnut gelding, 1987
Sire Rousillon (USA) 1981	Riverman (USA); 1969	Never Bend	Nasrullah
Sire Rousillon (USA) 1981	Riverman (USA); 1969	Never Bend	Lalun
Sire Rousillon (USA) 1981	Riverman (USA); 1969	River Lady	Prince John
Sire Rousillon (USA) 1981	Riverman (USA); 1969	River Lady	Nile Lily
Sire Rousillon (USA) 1981	Belle Dorine (USA); 1977	Marshua's Dancer	Raise a Native
Sire Rousillon (USA) 1981	Belle Dorine (USA); 1977	Marshua's Dancer	Marshua
Sire Rousillon (USA) 1981	Belle Dorine (USA); 1977	Palsy Walsy	Sea o' Erin
Sire Rousillon (USA) 1981	Belle Dorine (USA); 1977	Palsy Walsy	Allie's Pal
Dam Overplay (IRE) 1978	Bustino (GB); 1971	Busted	Crepello
Dam Overplay (IRE) 1978	Bustino (GB); 1971	Busted	Sans le Sou
Dam Overplay (IRE) 1978	Bustino (GB); 1971	Ship Yard	Doutelle
Dam Overplay (IRE) 1978	Bustino (GB); 1971	Ship Yard	Paving Stone
Dam Overplay (IRE) 1978	Melodramatic (GB); 1970	Tudor Melody	Tudor Minstrel
Dam Overplay (IRE) 1978	Melodramatic (GB); 1970	Tudor Melody	Matelda
Dam Overplay (IRE) 1978	Melodramatic (GB); 1970	Irish Flight	Ballymoss
Dam Overplay (IRE) 1978	Melodramatic (GB); 1970	Irish Flight	Winged Foot (Family 14-c)

== See also ==
- List of Melbourne Cup winners
