= Yeats (horse) =

Irish-bred Thoroughbred racehorse

- Sire: Sadler's Wells
- Grandsire: Northern Dancer
- Dam: Lyndonville
- Damsire: Top Ville
- Sex: Stallion
- Foaled: 23 April 2001
- Country: Ireland
- Colour: Bay
- Breeder: Barronstown Stud & Orpendale
- Owner: Sue Magnier & Diane Nagle
- Trainer: Aidan O'Brien
- Record: 22: 14-2-1
- Earnings: £1,146,977

Major wins
- Ballysax Stakes (2004); Derrinstown Stud Derby Trial (2004); Coronation Cup (2005); Goodwood Cup (2006, 2008); Ascot Gold Cup (2006, 2007, 2008, 2009); Vintage Crop Stakes (2007, 2008); Saval Beg Stakes (2007); Irish St. Leger (2007); Prix Royal-Oak (2008)

Awards
- European Champion Stayer (2006, 2007, 2008, 2009)

Yeats is an Irish Thoroughbred racehorse who won nine Group One (G1) races and is the only horse ever to win the Ascot Gold Cup four times in succession.

== Breeding ==
Yeats is a dark-coated bay horse with a small white star and white socks on his hind legs foaled on 23 April 2001 at Barronstown Stud. Yeats is by Sadler's Wells, out of Lyndonville (also owned by Barronstown Stud) by Top Ville. He is owned by Ballydoyle and Coolmore Stud boss John Magnier. He is named after the painter Jack Butler Yeats.

== Racing record ==
=== 2003: two-year-old season ===
Yeats began his racing career as a two-year-old with a win by four lengths in a maiden race, over eight furlongs, at the Curragh.

=== 2004: three-year-old season ===
Yeats was unbeaten in his next two starts, including the Derrinstown Stud Derby Trial in May 2004, and was hot favourite for The Derby, but met with a setback just days before the race and missed the rest of the season, returning almost 1 year later, finishing 2nd in a Group 3 in Ireland on heavy ground.

=== 2005: four-year-old season ===
Yeats' next start came at Epsom in the Coronation Cup, taking on subsequent Japan Cup winner Alkaased, Bandari and dual Coronation Cup winner Warrsan. Jockey Kieren Fallon adopted front-running tactics on the colt, and pulled away in the final quarter-mile to win by more than 2 lengths. The win made Yeats the first Irish-based horse to win the Coronation Cup since Roberto in 1973. Yeats attempted to follow up in the Group 1 Grand Prix de Saint-Cloud over the same distance, with new jockey Jimmy Fortune adopting hold-up tactics, but they failed to pay off, and Yeats trailed in 9th, 20 lengths behind the winner Alkaased.

The Irish St. Leger came next, reunited with Kieren Fallon, adopting similar hold-up tactics as Fortune in Yeats' previous start, and was staying-on towards the finish to come 4th, just a length and a half behind the winner Collier Hill. His final start of the season was to be the Canadian International Stakes at Woodbine Racetrack in Canada over 12 furlongs, but he missed the break and could never recover, finishing 12 lengths behind the victor.

=== 2006: five-year-old season ===
Yeats' first start of the 2006 season was at Royal Ascot in the Ascot Gold Cup, some 247 days after the Woodbine Canadian International Stakes. Fallon adopted a prominent position towards the start, and got to the front 4 furlongs out, and was only pulling away towards the end, winning by 4 lengths from Prix du Cadran winner Reefscape.

He attempted a rare double with the Goodwood Cup at the Glorious Goodwood meeting, carrying top weight and easing to victory by 5 lengths under new jockey Michael Kinane, since Fallon was banned from riding in the UK.

Yeats finished a disappointing 7th in the Melbourne Cup, with Kieren Fallon stating that his mount just lacked his usual finishing kick and was not suited by the stop-start pace of the race. He was forced to make a big move a mile out to get to the front, ensuring that he maintained his speed for the finishing straight.

He was voted the 2006 Cartier Racing Award as Top Stayer.

=== 2007: six-year-old season ===
In 2007 Yeats won his second consecutive Ascot Gold Cup and followed that up by winning the Irish St. Leger on his third attempt, giving trainer Aidan O'Brien his first win in that race, and the 1-2 as stablemate Scorpion came a close second to Yeats.

=== 2008: seven-year-old season ===
On 19 June 2008 Yeats became only the second horse in history to win the Ascot Gold Cup three times in succession, defeating Geordieland by 5 lengths. He followed this on 31 July with a second victory in the Goodwood Cup, winning by 7 lengths. Later in the year, on 26 October he won the Prix Royal-Oak at Longchamp.

=== 2009: eight-year-old season ===
On 18 June 2009, Yeats made Ascot history, becoming the first horse ever to win the Ascot Gold Cup four times in succession, ridden by Johnny Murtagh, and winning by 3½ lengths, making him arguably the best stayer of all time.

== Stud record ==
Yeats was retired to stud after his 2009 campaign. He has previously stood at Coolmore's headquarters farm in Ireland, but now stands at the company's National Hunt breeding farm, also in Ireland.

== Pedigree ==
Pedigree of Yeats (IRE), bay stallion, 2001
Sire Sadler's Wells	Northern Dancer	Nearctic	Nearco
Sire Sadler's Wells	Northern Dancer	Nearctic	Lady Angela
Sire Sadler's Wells	Northern Dancer	Natalma	Native Dancer
Sire Sadler's Wells	Northern Dancer	Natalma	Almahmoud
Sire Sadler's Wells	Fairy Bridge	Bold Reason	Hail To Reason
Sire Sadler's Wells	Fairy Bridge	Bold Reason	Lalun
Sire Sadler's Wells	Fairy Bridge	Special	Forli
Sire Sadler's Wells	Fairy Bridge	Special	Thong
Dam Lyndonville	Top Ville	High Top	Derring-Do
Dam Lyndonville	Top Ville	High Top	Camenae
Dam Lyndonville	Top Ville	Sega Ville	Charlottesville
Dam Lyndonville	Top Ville	Sega Ville	La Sega
Dam Lyndonville	Diamond Land	Sparkler	Hard Tack
Dam Lyndonville	Diamond Land	Sparkler	Diamond Spur
Dam Lyndonville	Diamond Land	Canaan	Santa Claus
Dam Lyndonville	Diamond Land	Canaan	Rustic Bridge

== See also ==
- List of racehorses
