= Irish St. Leger =

Irish St Leger
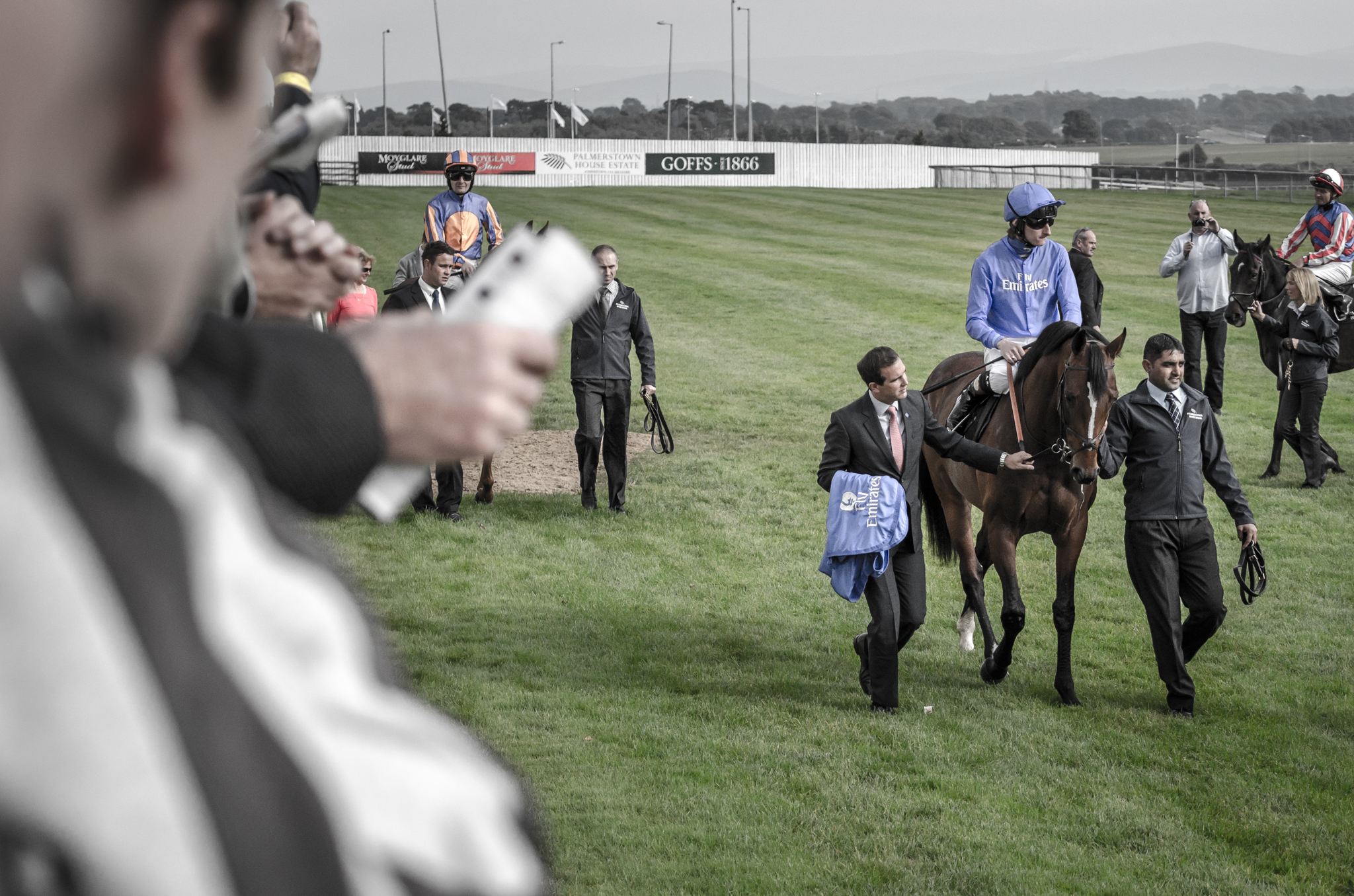
- The parade before the 2014 running
- Class: Group 1
- Location: Curragh Racecourse; County Kildare, Ireland
- Inaugurated: 1915
- Race type: Flat / Thoroughbred
- Sponsor: Comer Group
- Website: Curragh

Race information
- Distance: 1m 6f (2,816 metres)
- Surface: Turf
- Track: Right-handed
- Qualification: Three-years-old and up
- Weight: 9 st 1 lb (3yo); 9 st 9 lb (4yo+); Allowances; 3 lb for fillies and mares
- Purse: €460,000 (2021); 1st: €285,000

Irish St Leger
2026
Scandinavia	Queenstown	Jan Brueghel

Previous years
2025
Al Riffa	Amiloc	Al Qareem
2024
Kyprios	Vauban	Giavellotto
2023
Eldar Eldarov	Kyprios	Dawn Rising
2022
Kyprios	Hamish	Search For A Song
2021
Sonnyboyliston	Twilight Payment	Baron Samedi

2020-2011
2020
Search For A Song	Fujaira Prince	Twilight Payment
2019
Search For A Song	Kew Gardens	Southern France
2018
Flag Of Honour	Latrobe	Weekender
2017
Order Of St George	Torcedor	Mount Moriah
2016
Wicklow Brave	Order Of St George	Trip To Paris
2015
Order Of St George	Agent Murphy	Wicklow Brave
2014
Brown Panther	Leading Light	Encke
2013
Voleuse De Coeurs	Ahzeemah	Saddler's Rock
2012
Royal Diamond	Massiyn	Brown Panther
2011
Duncan	Jukebox Jury	Red Cadeaux

2010-2001
2010
Sans Frontieres	Profound Beauty	Flying Cross
2009
Alandi	Clowance	Schiaparelli
2008
Septimus	New Zealand	Red Moloney
2007
Yeats	Scorpion	Mores Wells
2006
Kastoria	Yeats	The Whistling Teal
2005
Collier Hill	The Whistling Teal	Vinnie Roe
2004
Vinnie Roe	Brian Boru	First Charter
2003
Vinnie Roe	Gamut	Powerscourt
2002
Vinnie Roe	Pugin	Ballingarry
2001
Vinnie Roe	Millenary	Marienbard

2000-1991
2000
Arctic Owl	Yavana's Pace	Mutafaweq
1999
Kayf Tara	Yavana's Pace	Silver Patriarch
1998
Kayf Tara	Silver Patriarch	Delilah
1997
Oscar Schindler	Persian Punch	Whitewater Affair
1996
Oscar Schindler	Key Change	Sacrament
1995
Strategic Choice	Moonax	Oscar Schindler
1994
Vintage Crop	Rayseka	Kithanga
1993
Vintage Crop	Assessor	Foresee
1992
Mashaallah	Snurge	Drum Taps
1991
Turgeon	Patricia	Zafadola

1990-1988
1990
Ibn Bey	Mr Pintips	Braashee
1989
Petite Ile	Tyrone Bridge	Lazaz
1988
Dark Lomond	Daarkom	Eurobird

The Irish St Leger is a Group 1 flat horse race in Ireland open to thoroughbreds aged three years or older. It is run at the Curragh over a distance of 1 mile and 6 furlongs (2,816 metres), and it is scheduled to take place each year in September.

It is Ireland's equivalent of the St Leger Stakes, a famous race in England (although unlike the English race, it is open to both horses above age three and geldings).

== History ==
The event was established in 1915, and it was originally restricted to three-year-olds. The first horse to win both the English and Irish St Legers was Royal Lancer in 1922.

The first Irish St. Leger winner to complete a Triple Crown (having previously won the Irish 2,000 Guineas and the Irish Derby) was Museum in 1935. The only subsequent horse to win all three races was Windsor Slipper in 1942.

The Irish St Leger became an open-age race in 1983, and there have been several repeat winners since then. The most successful has been Vinnie Roe, with four consecutive victories from 2001 to 2004.

The leading horses from the Irish St Leger sometimes go on to compete in the Melbourne Cup. The race has been sponsored by the Comer Group since 2014. It takes place on the second day of Irish Champions Weekend.

== Records ==
Most successful horse (4 wins):

- Vinnie Roe – 2001, 2002, 2003, 2004

Leading jockey (7 wins):

- Morny Wing – Kirk-Alloway (1920), O'Dempsey (1923), Sol de Terre (1930), Ochiltree (1938), Windsor Slipper (1942), Spam (1945), Esprit de France (1947)

Leading trainer (9 wins):

- Vincent O'Brien – Barclay (1959), White Gloves (1966), Reindeer (1969), Caucasus (1975), Meneval (1976), Transworld (1977), Gonzales (1980), Leading Counsel (1985), Dark Lomond (1988)
- Dermot Weld - Vintage Crop (1993, 1994), Vinnie Roe (2001, 2002, 2003, 2004), Voleuse de Coeurs (2013), Search for A Song (2019, 2020)

Leading owner since 1960 (6 wins) (includes part ownership):

- Susan Magnier - Yeats (2007), Septimus (2008), Order of St George (2015, 2017), Flag of Honour (2018), Kyprios (2022)

== Winners since 1972 ==
Year	Winner	Age	Jockey	Trainer	Owner	Time
1972	Pidget	3	T. P. Burns	Kevin Prendergast	Norman Butler	3:06.60
1973	Conor Pass	3	Paul Jarman	Kevin Prendergast	Rita Moore	3:14.20
1974	Mistigri	3	Christy Roche	Paddy Prendergast	Rory More O'Ferrall	3:10.00
1975	Caucasus	3	Lester Piggott	Vincent O'Brien	Jane Engelhard	3:02.40
1976	Meneval	3	Lester Piggott	Vincent O'Brien	Jacqueline Getty	3:02.10
1977	Transworld	3	Tommy Murphy	Vincent O'Brien	Simon Fraser	3:30.60
1978	M-Lolshan	3	Brian Taylor	Ryan Price	Essa Alkhalifa	3:04.10
1979	Niniski	3	Willie Carson	Dick Hern	Lady Beaverbrook	3:11.70
1980	Gonzales	3	Raymond Carroll	Vincent O'Brien	Robert Sangster	3:23.60
1981	Protection Racket	3	Brian Taylor	Jeremy Hindley	Serge Fradkoff	3:06.00
1982	Touching Wood	3	Paul Cook	Harry Thomson Jones	Maktoum Al Maktoum	3:10.20
1983	Mountain Lodge	4	Declan Gillespie	John Dunlop	3rd Earl of Halifax	3:15.90
1984	Opale	4	Darrel McHargue	Alec Stewart	Snailwell Stud	3:08.80
1985	Leading Counsel	3	Pat Eddery	Vincent O'Brien	Robert Sangster	3:15.80
1986	Authaal	3	Christy Roche	David O'Brien	Sheikh Mohammed	3:04.80
1987	Eurobird	3	Cash Asmussen	John Oxx	Gerald Jennings	3:18.70
1988	Dark Lomond	3	Declan Gillespie	Vincent O'Brien	Stavros Niarchos	3:15.00
1989	Petite Ile	3	Ron Quinton	John Oxx	Jean-François Malle	3:05.00
1990	Ibn Bey	6	Richard Quinn	Paul Cole	Fahd Salman	3:00.60
1991	Turgeon	5	Tony Cruz	Jonathan Pease	George Strawbridge	3:05.30
1992	Mashaallah	4	Steve Cauthen	John Gosden	Ahmed Al Maktoum	3:02.10
1993	Vintage Crop	6	Michael Kinane	Dermot Weld	Michael Smurfit	3:06.70
1994	Vintage Crop	7	Michael Kinane	Dermot Weld	Michael Smurfit	3:07.30
1995	Strategic Choice	4	Richard Quinn	Paul Cole	Martyn Arbib	3:00.90
1996	Oscar Schindler	4	Stephen Craine	Kevin Prendergast	Oliver Lehane	2:59.10
1997	Oscar Schindler	5	Stephen Craine	Kevin Prendergast	Oliver Lehane	3:06.40
1998	Kayf Tara	4	John Reid	Saeed bin Suroor	Godolphin	3:05.70
1999	Kayf Tara	5	Frankie Dettori	Saeed bin Suroor	Godolphin	3:12.50
2000	Arctic Owl	6	David Harrison	James Fanshawe	The Owl Society	3:02.20
2001	Vinnie Roe	3	Pat Smullen	Dermot Weld	Seamus Sheridan	2:58.40
2002	Vinnie Roe	4	Pat Smullen	Dermot Weld	Seamus Sheridan	2:59.00
2003	Vinnie Roe	5	Pat Smullen	Dermot Weld	Seamus Sheridan	2:58.90
2004	Vinnie Roe	6	Pat Smullen	Dermot Weld	Seamus Sheridan	3:03.90
2005	Collier Hill	7	Dean McKeown	Alan Swinbank	Hall / Young	3:01.20
2006	Kastoria	5	Michael Kinane	John Oxx	HH Aga Khan IV	3:01.00
2007	Yeats	6	Kieren Fallon	Aidan O'Brien	Magnier / Nagle	3:03.40
2008	Septimus	5	Seamie Heffernan	Aidan O'Brien	Smith / Magnier / Tabor	3:11.97
2009	Alandi	4	Michael Kinane	John Oxx	HH Aga Khan IV	3:14.82
2010	Sans Frontieres	4	Olivier Peslier	Jeremy Noseda	Sir Robert Ogden	3:10.36
2011 (dh)	Duncan; Jukebox Jury	6; 5	Eddie Ahern; Johnny Murtagh	John Gosden; Mark Johnston	Normandie Stud Ltd; Alan Spence	3:08.01
2012	Royal Diamond	6	Niall McCullagh	Tommy Carmody	Andrew Tinkler	3:08.47
2013	Voleuse de Coeurs	4	Chris Hayes	Dermot Weld	Lady O'Reilly	3:00.08
2014	Brown Panther	6	Richard Kingscote	Tom Dascombe	Black & Owen Promotions	2:57.15
2015	Order of St George	3	Joseph O'Brien	Aidan O'Brien	Smith / Magnier / Tabor	3:03.19
2016	Wicklow Brave	7	Frankie Dettori	Willie Mullins	Wicklow Bloodstock	3:05.95
2017	Order of St George	5	Ryan Moore	Aidan O'Brien	Smith / Magnier / Tabor	3:07.82
2018	Flag of Honour	3	Ryan Moore	Aidan O'Brien	Smith / Magnier / Tabor	3:05.72
2019	Search For A Song	3	Chris Hayes	Dermot Weld	Moyglare Stud Farm	3:03.24
2020	Search For A Song	4	Oisin Orr	Dermot Weld	Moyglare Stud Farm	3:06.50
2021	Sonnyboyliston	4	Ben Coen	Johnny Murtagh	Kildare Racing Club	3:02.05
2022	Kyprios	4	Ryan Moore	Aidan O'Brien	Moyglare Stud / Smith / Magnier / Tabor	3:04.67
2023	Eldar Eldarov	4	David Egan	Roger Varian	KHK Racing	3:01.72
2024	Kyprios	6	Ryan Moore	Aidan O'Brien	Moyglare Stud / Smith / Magnier / Tabor	2:59.04
2025	Al Riffa	5	Dylan Browne McMonagle	Joseph O'Brien	Australian Bloodstock Two	2:59.87
2026	Scandinavia	4	Ryan Moore	Aidan O'Brien	Tabor / Smith / Magnier	2:58.18

== Earlier winners ==
- 1915: La Paloma
- 1916: Captive Princess
- 1917: Double Scotch
- 1918: Dionysos
- 1919: Cheap Popularity
- 1920: Kirk-Alloway
- 1921: Kircubbin
- 1922: Royal Lancer
- 1923: O'Dempsey
- 1924: Zodiac
- 1925: Spelthorne
- 1926: Sunny View
- 1927: Ballyvoy
- 1928: Law Suit
- 1929: Trigo
- 1930: Sol de Terre
- 1931: Beaudelaire
- 1932: Hill Song
- 1933: Harinero
- 1934: Primero
- 1935: Museum
- 1936: Battle Song
- 1937: Owenstown
- 1938: Ochiltree
- 1939: Skoiter
- 1940: Harvest Feast
- 1941: Etoile de Lyons
- 1942: Windsor Slipper
- 1943: Solferino
- 1944: Water Street
- 1945: Spam
- 1946: Cassock
- 1947: Esprit de France
- 1948: Beau Sabreur
- 1949: Brown Rover
- 1950: Morning Madam
- 1951: Do Well
- 1952: Judicate
- 1953: Sea Charger
- 1954: Zarathustra
- 1955: Diamond Slipper
- 1956: Magnetic North
- 1957: Ommeyad
- 1958: Royal Highway
- 1959: Barclay
- 1960: Lynchris
- 1961: Vimadee
- 1962: Arctic Vale
- 1963: Christmas Island
- 1964: Biscayne
- 1965: Craighouse
- 1966: White Gloves
- 1967: Dan Kano
- 1968: Giolla Mear
- 1969: Reindeer
- 1970: Allangrange
- 1971: Parnell

== See also ==
- Horse racing in Ireland
- Irish Triple Crown race winners
- List of Irish flat horse races
