= Dermot Weld =

Irish racehorse trainer

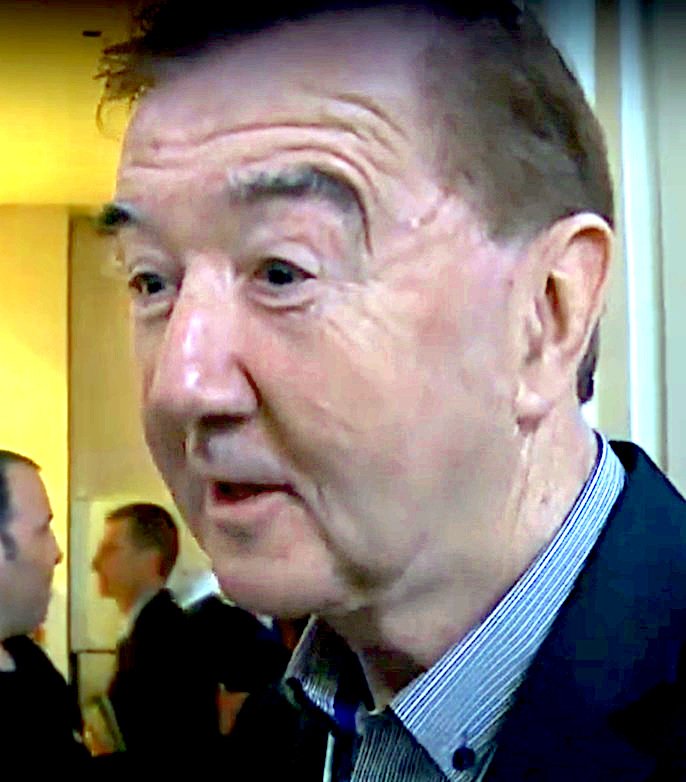
- Weld in 2014

Personal information
- Born: 29 July 1948 (age 78) Ireland
- Occupation: Trainer

Horse racing career
- Sport: Horse racing
- Career wins: 4000+ (ongoing)

Major racing wins
- European Flat racing: Irish Oaks (1981, 1996); Prix de l'Abbaye de Longchamp (1984, 1985); Irish 2,000 Guineas (1986); Irish 1,000 Guineas (1982, 1988, 2006, 2010, 2022,2023); Derby Italiano (1992); St. James's Palace Stakes (1992); Bayerisches Zuchtrennen (1993); Irish St. Leger (1993, 1994, 2001, 2002, 2003, 2004); Irish Derby (1996, 2004, 2016); Prix Royal-Oak (2001) British Classic Race wins: Epsom Derby (2016); Epsom Oaks (1981, 2024); 2,000 Guineas (2003) Coronation Stakes (2023) American Classic Race wins: Belmont Stakes (1990) International: Hong Kong Mile (1991); Melbourne Cup (1993, 2002); Secretariat Stakes (2008) Steeplechase / Hurdling: Anniversary 4-Y-O Novices' Hurdle (1986); Irish Grand National (1988); Triumph Hurdle (1990); Irish Champion Hurdle (1994, 1995); Punchestown Gold Cup (1980); Ryanair Gold Cup (1992)

Racing awards
- Champion trainer (Ireland), 8 times

Significant horses
- Vintage Crop, Blue Wind, Committed, Media Puzzle; Grey Swallow, Go and Go, Vinnie Roe

Dermot K. Weld (born 29 July 1948), in Kildare, is a former jockey, and one of Ireland's most successful racehorse trainers, setting the record in 2000 for the most winners trained in Ireland with 2,578. He won the Irish Flat Training Championship 8 times in 1983, 1985, 1989, 1990, 1993, 1994, 1996, and 1998. As a trainer, he won the Melbourne Cup in Australia twice, all five of the Irish Classics, the Epsom Derby and Oaks, the Hong Kong Mile, Italian and American Derby, and Breeders' Cup Turf.

== Education ==
Educated at Newbridge College, became a qualified veterinarian (UCD 1970) and at that time, the youngest qualified vet in Ireland. In 2016, Weld was awarded UCD Alumnus of the Year in Veterinary Medicine.

== Career ==
Weld started his career as an amateur jockey, obtaining a training licence in 1972, and took over the stable, at Rosewell House, in Curragh, Ireland, from his father, Charlie Weld, who was also a successful racehorse trainer. He went on to win the Irish Flat Training Championship 8 times in 1983, 1985, 1989, 1990, 1993, 1994, 1996, 1998.

He set a new record for the most winners trained in Ireland with 2,578 in August 2000, holding the record until Willie Mullins overtook it in May 2024.

He was played by Brendan Gleeson in the feature film The Cup (2011).

During his training career, he has saddled over 4000 winners (to 2016).

== Major wins ==
(Republic of Ireland) Ireland

- Irish 1000 Guineas - (6) - Prince's Polly (1982), Trusted Partner (1988), Nightime (2006), Bethrah (2010), Homeless Songs (2022), Tahiyra (2023)
- Irish 2000 Guineas - (1) - Flash of Steel (1986)
- Irish Derby - (3) - Zagreb (1996), Grey Swallow (2004), Harzand (2016)
- Irish Oaks - (2) - Blue Wind (1981), Dance Design (1996)
- Irish St Leger - (9) - Vintage Crop (1993, 1994), Vinnie Roe (2001, 2002, 2003, 2004), Voleuse de Coeurs (2013), Search For A Song (2019,2020)
- Matron Stakes - (4) - Valley Forge (1977), Dress to Thrill (2002), Emulous (2011), Tahiyra (2023)
- Moyglare Stud Stakes - (2) - Flutter Away (1987), Tahiyra (2022)
- National Stakes - (5) - Diamonds Are Trumps (1977), Day Is Done (1981), Definite Article (1994), Mus-If (1998), Refuse to Bend (2002)
- Phoenix Stakes - (2) - Kilijaro (1978), Smokey Lady (1979)
- Pretty Polly Stakes - (4) - Market Booster (1992), Dance Design (1996, 1997), Chinese White (2010)
- Tattersalls Gold Cup - (6) - Cockney Lass (1987), Definite Article (1996), Dance Design (1997), Grey Swallow (2005), Casual Conquest (2009), Fascinating Rock (2016)
- Punchestown Gold Cup - (1) - Pillar Brae (1980)
- Alanna Homes Champion Novice Hurdle - (1) - Treble Bob (1995)
- Arkle Novice Chase - (1) - General Idea (1992)
- Champion Four Year Old Hurdle - (2) - Allen’s Mistake (1988), Hisaabaat (2012)
- Champion INH Flat Race - (1) - Hidden Universe (2010)
- Chanelle Pharma Novice Hurdle - (2) - Midsummer Gamble (1987), General Idea (1991)
- December Festival Hurdle - (2) - Fortune and Fame (1993), Unaccompanied (2011)
- Herald Champion Novice Hurdle - (1) - Fortune and Fame (1992)
- Irish Champion Hurdle - (2) - Fortune and Fame (1994,1995)
- Ryanair Gold Cup - (1) - General Idea (1992)
- Savills Chase - (1) - General Idea (1992)
- Spring Juvenile Hurdle - (3) - Iron County Xmas (1998), Unaccompanied (2011), Hisaabaat (2012)

Australia

- Melbourne Cup - (2) - Vintage Crop (1993), Media Puzzle (2002)

France

- Prix de l'Abbaye de Longchamp - (2) - Committed (1984, 1985)
- Prix Royal-Oak - (1) - Vinnie Roe (2001)
- Prix Vermeille - (1) - Tarnawa (2020)
- Prix de l'Opéra - (1) - Tarnawa (2020)

Germany

- Bayerisches Zuchtrennen - (1) - Market Booster (1993)

(United Kingdom) Great Britain

- 2000 Guineas - (1) - Refuse to Bend (2003)
- Ascot Gold Cup - (1) - Rite Of Passage (2010)
- Champion Stakes - (1) - Fascinating Rock (2015)
- Cheveley Park Stakes - (1) - Sookera (1977)
- Coronation Stakes - (2) - Sutton Place (1978), Tahiyra (2023)
- Golden Jubilee Stakes - (2) - Committed (1984), Big Shuffle (1987)
- Middle Park Stakes - (1) - Steel Heart (1974)
- Nunthorpe Stakes - (1) - Committed (1984)
- Epsom Derby - (1) - Harzand (2016)
- Epsom Oaks - (2) - Blue Wind (1981), Ezeliya (2024)
- Prince of Wales's Stakes - (1) - Free Eagle (2015)
- St. James's Palace Stakes - (1) - Brief Truce (1992)
- Sun Chariot Stakes - (1) - Dress to Thrill (2002)
- Anniversary 4-Y-O Novices' Hurdle - (1) - Dark Raven (1986)
- Baring Bingham Novices' Hurdle - (1) - Windsor Park (2015)
- Champion Bumper - (1) - Silver Concorde (2014)
- Triumph Hurdle - (1) - Rare Holiday (1990)

Hong Kong

- Hong Kong Mile - (1) - Additional Risk (1991)

Italy

- Derby Italiano - (1) - In a Tiff (1992)

United States

- American Derby - (3) - Pine Dance (2000), Evolving Tactics (2003), Simple Exchange (2004)
- American Oaks - (1) - Dimitrova (2003)
- Belmont Stakes - (1) - Go and Go (1990)
- Breeders' Cup Turf - (1) - Tarnawa (2020)
- Flower Bowl Invitational Stakes - (1) - Dimitrova (2003)
- Man o' War Stakes - (1) - Zhukova (2017)
- Secretariat Stakes - (1) - Winchester (2008)
- Matriarch Stakes - (1) - Dress to Thrill (2002)
