= Sonnyboyliston =

Irish Thoroughbred racehorse

- Sire: Power
- Grandsire: Oasis Dream
- Dam: Miss Macnamara
- Damsire: Dylan Thomas
- Sex: Gelding
- Foaled: 5 March 2017
- Country: Ireland
- Colour: Chestnut
- Breeder: Diane O'Neill
- Owner: Kildare Racing Club
- Trainer: Johnny Murtagh
- Record: 14: 6-0-3
- Earnings: £667,089

Major wins
- Martin Molony Stakes (2021); Ebor Handicap (2021); Irish St Leger (2021)

Sonnyboyliston (foaled 5 March 2017) is an Irish Thoroughbred racehorse. He made no impact as a two-year-old and was gelded before returning in 2020 to win three handicap races. He improved to become a top-class stayer as a four-year-old in 2021, winning the Martin Molony Stakes, Ebor Handicap and Irish St Leger.

== Background ==
Sonnyboyliston is a chestnut horse with a white blaze bred in Ireland by Diane O'Neill. As a yearling in September 2018 he was consigned to the Tattersalls Ireland sale and was bought for €26,000 by the trainer Johnny Murtagh, acting on behalf of Liam Clarke's Kildare Racing Club partnership. The colt entered training with Murtagh at Coolaghknock Glebe, County Kildare.

He was from the fourth crop of foals sired by Power who won the National Stakes and the Irish 2000 Guineas. His other foals have included Laws of Indices (Prix Jean Prat), Helvic Dream (Tattersalls Gold Cup) and Mr Clint (Singapore Gold Cup). Sonnyboyliston was the first foal of his dam Miss Macnamara, a durable racemare who won five races on the flat and twice under National Hunt rules. Her dam Kincob was a sister of the Irish 2000 Guineas winner Bachelor Duke. Kincob was a great-great-granddaughter of the American broodmare Thong, whose other descendants have included Sadler's Wells, Nureyev, Thatch and El Condor Pasa.

== Racing career ==
=== 2019: two-year-old season ===
Sonnyboyliston began his racing career in a maiden race over seven furlongs on soft ground at the Curragh on 16 August when he started at odds of 25/1 and finished sixth behind Brook On Fifth, beaten more than ten lengths by the winner. He made no impression in two subsequent starts, finishing unplaced in one-mile maiden races at the Curragh in September and Navan Racecourse in October.

=== 2020: three-year-old season ===
Before the start of his second campaign Sonnyboyliston was gelded. The early part of the flat season was disrupted by the COVID-19 pandemic and Sonnyboyliston did not return to the track until 19 June when he started second favourite for a handicap race over one mile at Gowran Park. Ridden by the apprentice jockey Ben Coen he recorded his first success as he took the lead in the last quarter mile and won by one and a half lengths from Meaningful Star. In July he finished third in a ten furlong handicap at Navan and then carried 133 pounds to victory in a similar event at the Curragh catching the filly Thundering Nights on the line to win by a short head. Billy Lee took over from Coen when the gelding contested a more valuable handicap at the Curragh on 13 September when was matched against older horses. Starting at odds of 4/1 he went to the front approaching the final furlong and drew away to win by four and a quarter lengths from Finans Bay with third place being taken by Helvic Dream. For his final run of the year he was stepped up in class and finished fourth to Helvic Dream in the Group 3 International Stakes at the Curragh in October.

=== 2021: four-year-old season ===
Sonnyboyliston made his first appearance as a four-year-old in the Listed Devoy Stakes at Naas Racecourse on 28 March when he finished third behind Broome and Sunchart. In May he was sent to England and moved up in distance to run third behind Japan and Trueshan in the Ormonde Stakes over thirteen and a half furlongs at Chester Racecourse. On 18 June at Limerick Racecourse Sonnyboyliston started 6/5 favourite ahead of Sunchart for the Listed Martin Molony Stakes over one and a half miles on good ground in which he was ridden by Shane Kelly. He raced in mid-division before moving up to join the leaders in the last quarter mile, overtook Sunchart a furlong out and stayed on well to win by one and a half lengths.

On 10 July Sonnyboyliston ran for the second time in England but failed to reproduce his best form as he came home sixth behind Hukum in the Group 3 John Smith's Silver Cup Stakes over one and three quarter miles at York Racecourse. Six weeks later, over the same course and distance, the gelding was partnered by Coen (no longer an apprentice) when he started at odds of 10/1 under a weight of 134 pounds for the Ebor Handicap. Racing in heavy rain, Sonnyboyliston raced towards the rear of the twenty-runner field before beginning to make progress entering the last half mile. He joined the leaders approaching the final furlong and got the better of a sustained struggle with Quickthorn to win by a head with a length and a half back to Alounak in third place. After the race Johnny Murtagh said "I love this game! When I'm doing the entries for those races, because we have the horses for the big races now, I'm going back to my experience as a jockey and thinking - yeah that's the type of horse we need. He ran very well and that was a very good race. I loved the way he came home." He went on to mention the Irish St Leger and the Melbourne Cup as possible targets.

In the Irish St Leger at the Curragh on 12 September Sonnyboyliston (with Coen in the saddle) started the 4/1 second favourite behind Search For A Song in a thirteen-runner field which also included Twilight Payment, Baron Samedi (Belmont Gold Cup Stakes), Master of Reality (Vintage Crop Stakes) and Amhran Na Bhfiann (Curragh Cup). Sonnyboyliston settled behind the leaders as Amhran Na Bhfiann set the pace and opened up a big advantage. Twilight Payment reeled in the tiring front-runner in the straight but was soon challenged by Sonnyboyliston who took the lead approaching the final furlong and kept on well to win by three quarters of a length. Murtagh commented "This horse never disappoints and I thought he did very well to win today. It looked like a proper race and he had a good position all the way. He got into a battle, but he never lacks in a battle." Three days later the trainer announced that the gelding would not be sent to Australia for the Melbourne Cup, explaining "He’s been on the go for a long time and hasn’t let us down all year. I feel it’s time for him to have a little break now."

== Pedigree ==
Pedigree of Sonnyboyliston (IRE), bay gelding, 2017
Sire Power (GB) 2009	Oasis Dream (GB); 2000	Green Desert (USA)	Danzig
Sire Power (GB) 2009	Oasis Dream (GB); 2000	Green Desert (USA)	Foreign Courier
Sire Power (GB) 2009	Oasis Dream (GB); 2000	Hope (IRE)	Dancing Brave (USA)
Sire Power (GB) 2009	Oasis Dream (GB); 2000	Hope (IRE)	Bahamian
Sire Power (GB) 2009	Frappe (IRE); 1996	Inchinor (GB)	Ahonoora
Sire Power (GB) 2009	Frappe (IRE); 1996	Inchinor (GB)	Inchmurrin (IRE)
Sire Power (GB) 2009	Frappe (IRE); 1996	Glatisant (GB)	Rainbow Quest (USA)
Sire Power (GB) 2009	Frappe (IRE); 1996	Glatisant (GB)	Dancing Rocks
Dam Miss Macnamara (IRE) 2009	Dylan Thomas (IRE); 2003	Danehill (USA)	Danzig
Dam Miss Macnamara (IRE) 2009	Dylan Thomas (IRE); 2003	Danehill (USA)	Razyana
Dam Miss Macnamara (IRE) 2009	Dylan Thomas (IRE); 2003	Lagrion (USA)	Diesis (GB)
Dam Miss Macnamara (IRE) 2009	Dylan Thomas (IRE); 2003	Lagrion (USA)	Wrap It Up (IRE)
Dam Miss Macnamara (IRE) 2009	Kincob (USA); 2000	Kingmambo	Mr Prospector
Dam Miss Macnamara (IRE) 2009	Kincob (USA); 2000	Kingmambo	Miesque
Dam Miss Macnamara (IRE) 2009	Kincob (USA); 2000	Gossamer	Seattle Slew
Dam Miss Macnamara (IRE) 2009	Kincob (USA); 2000	Gossamer	Lisaleen (Family: 5-h)

- Sonnyboyliston is inbred 4 × 4 to Danzig, meaning that this stallion appears twice in the fourth generation of his pedigree.
