= Helvic Dream =

Irish Thoroughbred racehorse

- Sire: Power
- Grandsire: Oasis Dream
- Dam: Rachevie
- Damsire: Danehill Dancer
- Sex: Gelding
- Foaled: 12 March 2017
- Country: Ireland
- Colour: Bay
- Breeder: T O'Dwyer & K O'Brien
- Owner: Caroline Hendron & M Cahill
- Trainer: Noel Meade
- Record: 15: 4-2-5
- Earnings: £247,369

Major wins
- International Stakes (2020); Tattersalls Gold Cup (2021)

Helvic Dream (foaled 12 March 2017) is an Irish Thoroughbred racehorse. He won two minor races as a two-year-old in 2019 and made steady progress in the following year, taking the Group 3 International Stakes. In the spring of 2021 he made further improvement, finishing second in the Mooresbridge Stakes before winning the Group 1 Tattersalls Gold Cup.

== Background ==
Helvic Dream is a bay gelding with no white markings bred in Ireland by T O'Dwyer & K O'Brien. In November 2017 the foal was consigned to the Tattersalls Flat Foal & Breeding Stock Sale but failed to reach his reserve price of €4,000 and was bought back by his vendors. In September 2018 he returned to the Tattersalls sales ring as a yearling colt and was bought for €12,000 by Peter Nolan Bloodstock. Helvic Dream entered the ownership of Caroline Hendron & M Cahill and was sent into training with Noel Meade at Castletown, County Meath. He was gelded before the start of his racing career.

He was from the fourth crop of foals sired by Power who won the National Stakes and the Irish 2000 Guineas. His other foals have included Laws of Indices, Sonnyboyliston and Mr Clint (Singapore Gold Cup). Helvic Dream's dam Rachevie never appeared on the track, but came from a good family as her grand-dam was a half-sister to Diminuendo.

== Racing career ==
=== 2019: two-year-old season ===
Helvic Dream began his track career in a maiden race over five furlongs at Down Royal on 22 June when he started at odds of 11/2 and finished third behind Invincible Diva, beaten six lengths by the winner. After finishing third in a similar event over seven furlongs at Galway Racecourse, the gelding started at 11/4 for a minor race over 7 1/2 furlongs on soft ground at Roscommon Racecourse on 19 August and recorded his first success as he won "comfortably" by 3 1/2 lengths from Xian Express. Over the same course and distance on 2 September Helvic Dream won again as he took the lead approaching the final furlong and drew away to win "easily" by 4 1/2 lengths.

=== 2020: three-year-old season ===
The 2020 flat racing season in Ireland was disrupted by the COVID-19 pandemic and Helvic Dream did not reappear until 19 June when he finished second under a weight of 140 pounds in a handicap over 9 1/2 furlongs at Gowran Park. In July he was stepped up in class and finished third in the Listed Lenebane Stakes at Roscommonn and then came home eighth in a handicap at Galway. He went on to run third in the Listed Ruby Stakes at Killarney Racecourse in August when he took the lead two furlongs out but was run down in the final strides and lost out to So Wonderful and Up Helly Aa in a three-way photo finish.

Helvic Dream then finished third to Sonnyboyliston in a valuable handicap over ten furlongs at the Curragh before stepping up to Group 3 level for the International Stakes over the same course and distance on 11 October. Ridden by Colin Keane who had partnered him unsuccessfully in four of his previous races, Helvic Dream started the 6/1 fourth choice in the betting behind Up Helly Aa, Sonnyboyliston and Order of Australia. After being restrained towards the rear of the nine-runner field he moved up to take the lead inside the last quarter mile and pulled away to win "easily" by 7 1/2 lengths from Up Helly Aa. Noel Meade commented "He’s been a very unlucky horse all year, it’s quite incredible it was one disaster after another. At Killarney, [his jockey] he felt he went a bit early on him. At Roscommon in a Listed race, we made far too much use of him in heavy ground. I think he will stay a mile and a half. I told his owners that I think he is a stakes horse. I’ve felt that all along, and it didn’t surprise me that he won today although it did the ease of the win." Three weeks later the gelding started favourite for the Listed Trigo Stakes at Leopardstown Racecourse but ran poorly and came home eighth of the twelve runners.

=== 2021: four-year-old season ===
Helvic Dream was ridden by Keane in her first four starts of 2021. He began his campaign in the Listed Devoy Stakes over ten furlongs at Naas Racecourse on 28 March when he came home eighth of the twelve runners behind the Aidan O'Brien-trained Broome, beaten more than fifteen lengths by the winner. In the Group 3 Alleged Stakes at the Curragh three weeks later he produced a better effort as he stayed on well in the closing stages to finish fourth behind Broome, Thundering Nights and Up Helly Aa. He improved again in the Group 2 Mooresbridge Stakes at the Curragh when he ran second to Broome, with Twilight Payment in third and Up Helly Aa in fourth place.

On 23 May at the same track, Helvic Dream was moved up to Group 1 class for the first time to contest the Tattersalls Gold Cup over 10 1/2 furlongs on soft to heavy ground and started 8/1 joint second choice in the betting behind Broome in an eight-runner field which also included Search For A Song, Serpentine, True Self (Queen Elizabeth Stakes (VRC)), Cayenne Pepper (Blandford Stakes) and Tiger Moth (second in the Melbourne Cup). Helvic Dream settled towards the rear in the early stages as the outsider Sunchart set the pace, and moved into contention with a run up the inside on the final turn. Broome took the lead in the straight but Helvic Dream ranged up alongside his old rival approaching the final furlong and got the better of a sustained struggle over the closing stages to win by a short head. Noel Meade, who was best known for his successes in National Hunt races said "I can die a happy man. I'm thrilled. I've been second in the Guineas twice and placed in classics, fourth in the Epsom Derby, but that's the first Group 1 winner [on the flat]. There have been plenty of people trying to buy him, but thanks to the lads- they kept faith in me."

== Pedigree ==
Pedigree of Helvic Dream (IRE), bay gelding, 2017
Sire Power (GB) 2009	Oasis Dream (GB); 2000	Green Desert (USA)	Danzig
Sire Power (GB) 2009	Oasis Dream (GB); 2000	Green Desert (USA)	Foreign Courier
Sire Power (GB) 2009	Oasis Dream (GB); 2000	Hope (IRE)	Dancing Brave (USA)
Sire Power (GB) 2009	Oasis Dream (GB); 2000	Hope (IRE)	Bahamian
Sire Power (GB) 2009	Frappe (IRE); 1996	Inchinor (GB)	Ahonoora
Sire Power (GB) 2009	Frappe (IRE); 1996	Inchinor (GB)	Inchmurrin (IRE)
Sire Power (GB) 2009	Frappe (IRE); 1996	Glatisant (GB)	Rainbow Quest (USA)
Sire Power (GB) 2009	Frappe (IRE); 1996	Glatisant (GB)	Dancing Rocks
Dam Rachevie (IRE) 2013	Danehill Dancer (IRE); 1993	Danehill (USA)	Danzig
Dam Rachevie (IRE) 2013	Danehill Dancer (IRE); 1993	Danehill (USA)	Razyana
Dam Rachevie (IRE) 2013	Danehill Dancer (IRE); 1993	Mira Adonde (USA)	Sharpen Up (GB)
Dam Rachevie (IRE) 2013	Danehill Dancer (IRE); 1993	Mira Adonde (USA)	Lettre d'Amour
Dam Rachevie (IRE) 2013	Challow Hills (USA); 2005	Woodman	Mr Prospector
Dam Rachevie (IRE) 2013	Challow Hills (USA); 2005	Woodman	Playmate
Dam Rachevie (IRE) 2013	Challow Hills (USA); 2005	Cascassi	Nijinsky (CAN)
Dam Rachevie (IRE) 2013	Challow Hills (USA); 2005	Cascassi	Cacti (Family: 1-d)

- Helvic Dream is inbred 4 × 4 to Danzig, meaning that this stallion appears twice in the fourth generation of his pedigree.
