= Aqlaam =

British-bred Thoroughbred racehorse

- Sire: Oasis Dream
- Grandsire: Green Desert
- Dam: Bourbonella
- Damsire: Rainbow Quest
- Sex: Stallion
- Foaled: 18 January 2005
- Country: United Kingdom
- Colour: Bay
- Breeder: Granham Farm
- Owner: Hamdan Al Maktoum
- Trainer: William Haggas
- Record: 9: 4-1-2
- Earnings: £503,565

Major wins
- Jersey Stakes (2008); Summer Mile Stakes (2009); Prix du Moulin (2009)

Aqlaam (18 January 2005 – 5 October 2013) was a British Thoroughbred racehorse and sire. After finishing third on his only start as a juvenile he won both of his races as a three-year-old in 2008 including the Group 3 Jersey Stakes. He reached his peak in 2009 when he won the Summer Mile Stakes and the Prix du Moulin as well as finishing second in the Prix Jacques Le Marois and third in the Queen Anne Stakes. He showed some promise as a breeding stallion before dying on 5 October 2013 at the age of eight.

== Background ==
Aqlaam was a bay horse with a small white star bred in England by the Wiltshire-based Granham Farm. As a foal in November 2005 he was consigned to the Tattersalls sale and was bought for 260,000 guineas by Hamdan Al Maktoum's Shadwell Estate Company. The colt was sent into training with William Haggas at the Somerville Lodge stable in Newmarket, Suffolk. He was ridden in all of his races by Richard Hills who said of Aqlaam "he is the bravest horse you could want to ride. He would run through a brick wall for you".

He was sired by Oasis Dream, a sprinter who won the July Cup and the Nunthorpe Stakes in 2003 before becoming a very successful breeding stallion. His other progeny have included Midday, Muhaarar and Power. Aqlaam's dam Bourbonella never contested a race but produced several other minor winners and was a half-sister to Persian Punch.

== Racing career ==
=== 2007: two-year-old season ===
Aqlaam began his racing career in a maiden race over six furlongs at Ascot Racecourse on 29 July in which he started at odds of 5/1 and finished third, beaten a short head and a length by Atlantic Sport and Skadrak.

=== 2008: three-year-old season ===
On his three-year-old debut Aqlaam started favourite for a twenty-runner maiden over seven furlongs at Newbury Racecourse on 17 May and won "readily" by two and three quarter lengths after taking the lead approaching the final furlong. The colt was then moved up in class to contest the Group 3 Jersey Stakes at Royal Ascot on 18 June and started at odds of 13/2 in a sixteen-runner field which included Calming Influence (King Charles II Stakes), Jupiter Pluvius (Killavullan Stakes), Strike the Deal (Richmond Stakes) and Stimulation (European Free Handicap). Aqlaam tracked the leaders before going to the front two furlongs from the finish and despite hanging abruptly to the left he won "readily" by two lengths from Il Warrd. After the race William Haggas said "I'm thrilled to bits. We've always liked Aqlaam and he's just kept improving" while Richard Hills commented "His last two pieces of work were exceptional and for the last six weeks he has just kept improving."

=== 2009: four-year-old season ===
After an absence of almost eleven months Aqlaam returned for the Lockinge Stakes over one mile at Newbury in May 2009 and came home tenth of the eleven runners behind Virtual. On 16 June at Royal Ascot the colt produced a much improved effort as he finished third behind Paco Boy and Cesare in the Queen Anne Stakes. On 11 July at Ascot Aqlaam was made the 15/8 favourite for the Group 2 Summer Mile against six opponents including Cesare and the South African gelding Imbongi. After tracking the leaders he took the lead a furlong out and won by half a length from Confront.

On 16 August Aqlaam was sent to France to contest the Group 1 Prix Jacques Le Marois over 1600 metres at Deauville Racecourse. He proved no match for the four-year-old filly Goldikova, who won easily, but came home five lengths clear of the third placed Virtual. The colt returned to France on 9 September for the Prix du Moulin at Longchamp Racecourse and started at odds of 7/2 in a nine-runner field. His opponents included Elusive Wave, Famous Name (Desmond Stakes), Gladiatorus, Virtual, Oiseau de Feu (Prix Paul de Moussac) and Balthazaar's Gift (Hungerford Stakes). After racing in second place behind Gladiatorus, he took the lead approaching the last 200 metres and kept on strongly to win by one and a half lengths from Famous Name. Shortly after the race Hills said "I've just spoken to Sheikh Hamdan in Dubai and I promise, you'd think he'd won the Derby – we are very relieved he won". Seventeen days later the colt contested the Queen Elizabeth II Stakes at Ascot in which he led for most of the way before being overtaken in the straight and finishing last of the four runners behind Rip Van Winkle.

In the 2009 World Thoroughbred Rankings Aqlaam was rated the 43rd best racehorse in the world.

== Stud record ==
At the end of his racing career, Aqlaam was retired to become a breeding stallion at his owner's Nunnery Stud near Thetford. The most successful of his offspring was the mare Dancing Star who won the Stewards' Cup in 2016. on 5 October 2013 died after suffering an "infection to the guttural pouch". The stud's director Richard Lancaster said "This is an enormous blow to everyone involved with Aqlaam as it has come just as he was establishing himself as an exciting young stallion."

== Pedigree ==
Pedigree of Aqlaam (GB), bay stallion, 2005
Sire Oasis Dream (GB) 2000	Green Desert (USA); 1983	Danzig	Northern Dancer (CAN)
Sire Oasis Dream (GB) 2000	Green Desert (USA); 1983	Danzig	Pas de Nom
Sire Oasis Dream (GB) 2000	Green Desert (USA); 1983	Foreign Courier	Sir Ivor
Sire Oasis Dream (GB) 2000	Green Desert (USA); 1983	Foreign Courier	Courtly Dee
Sire Oasis Dream (GB) 2000	Hope (IRE); 1991	Dancing Brave (USA)	Lyphard
Sire Oasis Dream (GB) 2000	Hope (IRE); 1991	Dancing Brave (USA)	Navajo Princess
Sire Oasis Dream (GB) 2000	Hope (IRE); 1991	Bahamian	Mill Reef (USA)
Sire Oasis Dream (GB) 2000	Hope (IRE); 1991	Bahamian	Sorbus
Dam Bourbonella (GB) 2000	Rainbow Quest (USA); 1981	Blushing Groom	Red God (USA)
Dam Bourbonella (GB) 2000	Rainbow Quest (USA); 1981	Blushing Groom	Runaway Bride (GB)
Dam Bourbonella (GB) 2000	Rainbow Quest (USA); 1981	I Will Follow (USA)	Herbager (FR)
Dam Bourbonella (GB) 2000	Rainbow Quest (USA); 1981	I Will Follow (USA)	Where You Lead
Dam Bourbonella (GB) 2000	Rum Cay (USA); 1985	Our Native	Exclusive Native
Dam Bourbonella (GB) 2000	Rum Cay (USA); 1985	Our Native	Our Jackie
Dam Bourbonella (GB) 2000	Rum Cay (USA); 1985	Oraston (GB)	Morston (FR)
Dam Bourbonella (GB) 2000	Rum Cay (USA); 1985	Oraston (GB)	Orange Cap (Family: 3-n)
