= Laws of Indices (horse) =

Irish Thoroughbred racehorse

- Sire: Power
- Grandsire: Oasis Dream
- Dam: Sampers
- Damsire: Exceed And Excel
- Sex: Stallion
- Foaled: 31 March 2018
- Country: Ireland
- Colour: Bay
- Breeder: Nicholas Hartery
- Owner: Charlotte Holmes
- Trainer: Ken Condon
- Record: 12: 3-0-1
- Earnings: £402,068

Major wins
- Railway Stakes (2020); Prix Jean Prat (2021)

Laws of Indices (foaled 31 March 2018) is an Irish Thoroughbred racehorse. He showed very good form as a two-year-old in 2020 when he won two races including the Railway Stakes as well as finishing third in the Prix Jean-Luc Lagardère and fourth in the Phoenix Stakes. In the following year he was beaten in his first three races but then recorded an upset victory in the Group 1 Prix Jean Prat.

== Background ==
Laws of Indices is a bay colt with a white blaze and two white socks bred in Ireland by Nicholas Hartery. In October 2019 he was consigned to the Goffs Autumn Yearling Sale and was bought for €8,000 by the bloodstock agent Dermot Farrington. He entered the ownership of Charlotte Holmes and was sent into training with Ken Condon at Rathbride, County Kildare.

He was from the fifth crop of foals sired by Power who won the National Stakes and the Irish 2,000 Guineas. His other foals have included Mr Clint (Singapore Gold Cup) and Helvic Dream (Tattersalls Gold Cup). Laws of Indices's dam Sampers showed modest racing ability, winning three minor races at Dundalk Racecourse in a thirteen-race career. She was a granddaughter of the Prix de Malleret winner Privity, who was in turn a daughter of the Princess Royal Stakes winner Sylph, a full sister to the Irish St. Leger winner Leading Counsel.

== Racing career ==
=== 2020: two-year-old season ===
Laws of Indices was ridden by Billy Lee in all but one of his races in 2020. He began his racing career in a maiden race over six furlongs on good to firm ground at Naas Racecourse on 8 June when he started at odds of 80/1 and came home ninth of the eighteen runners behind Lucky Vega, beaten six lengths by the winner. Fifteen days later, the colt started 3/1 second favourite for a similar event over five and a half furlongs at Navan Racecourse and recorded his first victory as he stayed on to take the lead in the final strides and win by a short head and a neck from Street Kid and The Blue Panther. Chris Hayes took the ride when Laws of Indices was stepped up in class for the Group 2 Railway Stakes over six furlongs on yielding ground at the Curragh and started the 66/1 outsider of the seven-runner field. After racing towards the rear of the field he moved up to take the lead and held off the sustained challenge from Lucky Vega to win by half a length. Ken Condon commented "He's taken a big step forward from what he did at Navan. I would have been delighted to be placed, to be perfectly honest with you. He probably wants seven furlongs, but he needed to stay today on that sort of ground."

For his last three races of 2020, Laws of Indices was campaigned at Group 1 level. In the Phoenix Stakes at the Curragh on 9 August he stayed on well in the closing stages without being able to reach the leaders and came home fourth behind Lucky Vega. At the same track on 13 September he started at odds of 18/1 for the seven-furlong National Stakes and finished seventh behind Thunder Moon. For his final run of the year he was sent to France to contest the Prix Jean-Luc Lagardère over 1400 metres at Longchamp Racecourse on 4 October and ran third behind Sealiway and Nando Parrado.

=== 2021: three-year-old season ===
On his first appearance of 2021 Laws of Indices started a 22/1 outsider for the Listed 2,000 Guineas Trial Stakes on 11 April at Leopardstown Racecourse and came home fifth of the ten runners behind Poetic Flare. He was then dropped back to sprint distances for the Lacken Stakes over six furlongs at Naas Racecourse and came home fourth of the nine runners behind A Case of You after leading for most of the way. At Royal Ascot in June he returned to Group 1 class and finished fifth of the fifteen runners in the Commonwealth Cup.

For his next race Laws of Indices was sent to France to contest the Group 1 Prix Jean Prat over 1400 metres on very soft ground at Deauville Racecourse on 11 July when he was ridden by Olivier Peslier and started a 29/1 outsider. The unbeaten Prix Herod winner Midtown started favourite, while the other eleven runners included Thunder Snow, Battleground (Vintage Stakes), Erasmo (Prix Paul de Moussac), Reina Madre (Prix Imprudence) and Fast Raaj (Prix Djebel). In a change of tactics, Laws of Indices went to the front from the start, led throughout the race down the centre of the track, and stayed on "gamely" in the closing stages to win by a head from Thunder Moon. Peslier, who was winning the race for the fifth time, commented "He can be lazy when he starts, but he started well today because the trip was longer. He travelled well and we accelerated, and then he fought well." 5

Laws of Indices returned to Deauville in August for the Prix Maurice de Gheest over when he was matched against older horses. He started a 28/1 outsider and raced in fourth place for most of the way before fading in the closing stages and finishing eighth of the twelve runners behind the six-year-old Marianafoot. In September a half share in the colt was sold to a group of Australian owners and he was exported to join the stable of Annabel Neasham at Warwick Farm, New South Wales. On his first appearance for his new connections he finished fifth in the Golden Eagle over 1500 metres at Rosehill Gardens Racecourse on 30 October.

== Pedigree ==
Pedigree of Laws of Indices (IRE), bay colt, 2018
Sire Power (GB) 2009	Oasis Dream (GB); 2000	Green Desert (USA)	Danzig
Sire Power (GB) 2009	Oasis Dream (GB); 2000	Green Desert (USA)	Foreign Courier
Sire Power (GB) 2009	Oasis Dream (GB); 2000	Hope (IRE)	Dancing Brave (USA)
Sire Power (GB) 2009	Oasis Dream (GB); 2000	Hope (IRE)	Bahamian
Sire Power (GB) 2009	Frappe (IRE); 1996	Inchinor (GB)	Ahonoora
Sire Power (GB) 2009	Frappe (IRE); 1996	Inchinor (GB)	Inchmurrin (IRE)
Sire Power (GB) 2009	Frappe (IRE); 1996	Glatisant (GB)	Rainbow Quest (USA)
Sire Power (GB) 2009	Frappe (IRE); 1996	Glatisant (GB)	Dancing Rocks
Dam Sampers (IRE) 2006	Exceed And Excel (AUS); 2000	Danehill (USA)	Danzig
Dam Sampers (IRE) 2006	Exceed And Excel (AUS); 2000	Danehill (USA)	Razyana
Dam Sampers (IRE) 2006	Exceed And Excel (AUS); 2000	Patrona (USA)	Lomond
Dam Sampers (IRE) 2006	Exceed And Excel (AUS); 2000	Patrona (USA)	Gladiolus
Dam Sampers (IRE) 2006	Gujarat (USA); 1998	Distant View	Mr. Prospector
Dam Sampers (IRE) 2006	Gujarat (USA); 1998	Distant View	Seven Springs
Dam Sampers (IRE) 2006	Gujarat (USA); 1998	Privity	Private Account
Dam Sampers (IRE) 2006	Gujarat (USA); 1998	Privity	Sylph (Family: 13-c)

- Laws of Indices is inbred 4 × 4 to Danzig, meaning that this stallion appears twice in the fourth generation of his pedigree.
