= Broome (horse) =

Irish-bred Thoroughbred racehorse

- Sire: Australia
- Grandsire: Galileo
- Dam: Sweepstake
- Damsire: Acclamation
- Sex: Stallion
- Foaled: 8 February 2016
- Country: Ireland
- Colour: Bay
- Breeder: Epona Bloodstock Ltd
- Owner: Derrick Smith, Susan Magnier, Michael Tabor & Masaaki Matsushima
- Trainer: Aidan O'Brien
- Record: 32: 9-6-0
- Earnings: £2,137,500

Major wins
- Ballysax Stakes (2019); Derrinstown Stud Derby Trial (2019); Devoy Stakes (2021); Alleged Stakes (2021); Mooresbridge Stakes (2021); Grand Prix de Saint-Cloud (2021); Hardwicke Stakes (2022); Dubai Gold Cup (2023)

Broome (foaled 8 February 2016) is an Irish Thoroughbred racehorse and stallion. He showed very good form as a juvenile in 2018 when he won one minor race and ran second in both the Champions Juvenile Stakes and the Prix Jean-Luc Lagardère. He improved in the following year to win the Ballysax Stakes and the Derrinstown Stud Derby Trial before finishing a close fourth in the Epsom Derby. After running poorly in two races in 2020 he returned to form as a five-year-old to win the Devoy Stakes, Alleged Stakes, Mooresbridge Stakes and Grand Prix de Saint-Cloud.

== Background ==
Broome is a bay horse with a white blaze and a white sock on his left hind leg bred in Ireland by Epona Bloodstock. In September 2017 the yearling colt was consigned to the Goffs Orby sale but failed to reach his reserve price of €120,000 Two months later, the colt was sent to the Tattersalls sales in England and was bought for 150,000 guineas by Michael Magnier on behalf of his father, John Magnier's Coolmore Stud organisation. He entered the ownership of the Coolmore partners Derrick Smith, Susan Magnier, Michael Tabor and Anne-Marie O'Brien, and was sent into training with Aidan O'Brien at Ballydoyle.

He was from the first crop of foals sired by Australia who won the Epsom Derby, Irish Derby and International Stakes in 2014. Broome's dam Sweepstake showed good racing ability in England and the United States, winning the National Stakes and being placed in both the Princess Margaret Stakes and the Appalachian Stakes. Her dam Dust Flicker was a full-sister to the dam of Zoffany. She was distantly descended from the influential American broodmare Etoile Filante (foaled 1918).

== Racing career ==
=== 2018: two-year-old season ===
Broome made his racecourse debut in a maiden race over one mile at Killarney Racecourse on 15 July when he started at odds of 8/1 and finished fifth behind his stablemate Anthony Van Dyck beaten more than ten lengths by the winner. Three weeks later he started odds on favourite for a maiden at Galway Racecourse when he was ridden by his trainer's son Donnacha and recorded his first success as he led for most of the way and won "comfortably" by one and a half lengths from the filly Lightning Amber. The colt was steadily moved up in class in his three remaining races of 2018, starting with a trip to England for the Group 3 Acomb Stakes over seven furlongs at York Racecourse on 22 August when he came home sixth of the eight runners behind Phoenix of Spain. In the Group 2 Champions Juvenile Stakes on good to firm ground at Leopardstown Racecourse in September he produced a much better effort as he ran second to Madhmoon. On 7 October Broome was sent to France to contest the Group 1 Prix Jean-Luc Lagardère over 1600 metres at Longchamp Racecourse. Ridden by Ryan Moore he led for most of the way before being overtaken by Royal Marine in the straight and despite rallying in the closing stages he was beaten a neck into second place.

=== 2019: three-year-old season ===
On 6 April Broome began his second campaign in the Group 3 Ballysax Stakes over ten furlongs on soft ground at Leopardstown when he was ridden by Ryan Moore and started 5/2 second favourite behind the Dermot Weld-trained Tankerville. After starting slowly he made steady progress to overtake his stablemate Sovereign a furlong and a half from the finish and drew away to win "easily" by eight lengths. After the race Aidan O'Brien said "You'd be delighted with that. We always thought he was a horse that when he went further, he'd appreciate it. He's lovely and sleepy and lazy. We made the decision that we'd take our time with him this year. Last year we maybe forced him a little bit because he stayed so well and it wasn't really fair to him. He loves relaxing there and the great thing is that he really gallops home." Donnacha O'Brien took the ride when Broome started 2/5 favourite for the Group 3 Derrinstown Stud Derby Trial over the same course and distance on 12 May. He settled towards the rear of the seven-runner field before overtaking his front-running stablemate Blenheim Palace and won comfortably by two and a half lengths. Aidan O'Brien, who was winning the race for the twelfth time said "He'll have learned plenty from that. He's a very lazy colt but picked up well when Donnacha asked him to go and was well on top at the finish. He always does what he's asked to do, and that's what you like to see... Epsom will be next providing he comes out of this race OK."

In the 240th running of the Derby over one and a half miles at Epsom Racecourse on 1 June 2019, Broome was ridden by Donnacha O'Brien and started the 4/1 second favourite behind his stablemate Sir Dragonet. After turning into the straight in seventh place he made a sustained run on the outside and finished fourth behind Anthony Van Dyck, Madhmoon and Japan beaten three quarters of a length in a blanket finish. Four weeks later the colt started second favourite for the Irish Derby at the Curragh but ran poorly and came home sixth of the eight runners behind Sovereign.

In August it was announced that Broome had been bought for an undisclosed sum by Masaaki Matsushima. The Prix de l'Arc de Triomphe was stated to be his objective but the colt did not race again in 2019.

=== 2020: four-year-old season ===
After an absence of more than eleven months Broome returned in a strongly contested edition of the Coronation Cup over one and a half miles at Newmarket Racecourse on 5 June (the race is usually run at Epsom but was relocated owing to the COVID-19 pandemic). Ridden by James Doyle he started slowly and never looked likely to win, coming home fourth behind Ghaiyyath, Anthony Van Dyck and Stradivarius. Following another lengthy absence the colt was stepped up in distance for the British Champions Long Distance Cup on 17 October at Ascot Racecourse but ran poorly and finished last of the thirteen runners, beaten more than sixty lengths by the winner Trueshan.

=== 2021: five-year-old season ===
==== Spring ====
Broome began his fourth campaign in the Listed Devoy Stakes over ten furlongs on soft ground at Naas Racecourse on 28 March when he was ridden by Seamie Heffernan and started the 7/2 second favourite behind Up Helly Aa. After his customary slow start Broome overtook the front-running Sunchart approaching the last quarter mile and won "easily" by three and a half lengths to record his first success in more than 22 months. Aidan O’Brien commented, “Last year we couldn’t get him right all season but everything has gone really well with him through the winter and into the spring this year... You could see he was getting stuck in the ground a little bit but it didn’t stop him." Three weeks later, with Moore in the saddle, Broome started 2/5 favourite for the Group 3 Alleged Stakes over ten furlongs at the Curragh and won again, producing a strong late run to beat the filly Thundering Nights by half a length with Up Helly Aa in third and Helvic Dream in fourth. O'Brien commented "He's a lovely horse and will probably love going back up to a mile and a half. Ryan felt the pace was nice early and then dropped in the middle of the race. He had to work a bit harder than if the pace was consistent over a mile and a quarter. He's brave."

On 3 May over the same course and distance, Broome contested the Group 2 Mooresbridge Stakes and started 4/9 favourite against five opponents including Up Helly Aa, Helvic Dream and Twilight Payment. He raced in second place before gaining the advantage from the pace-setter Ancient Spirit and repelled a challenge from Helvic Dream to win by two lengths. O'Brien said "[He's] come back very well this year. There's plenty left in there and he kind of played with them, to be honest. He's unbeaten at ten furlongs but I do think he'll get further." Three weeks later at the same track, Broome returned to Group 1 class for the first for the Tattersalls Gold Cup over ten and a half furlongs on soft to heavy ground at the Curragh and started 10/11 favourite in an eight-runner field. He took the lead two furlongs from the finish but was caught by Helvic Dream in the final strides and beaten a short head into second place.

==== Summer ====
For his next race, Broome was sent to England and started favourite for the Group 2 Hardwicke Stakes over one and a half miles at Royal Ascot on 19 June. He tracked the leaders before making steady progress in the straight but was unable to catch the four-year-old filly Wonderful Tonight and finished second, beaten one and a half lengths by the winner. Two weeks after his defeat at Ascot, Broome was sent to Saint-Cloud Racecourse in France to contest the Group 1 Grand Prix de Saint-Cloud over 2500 metres and started 3.9/1 second favourite behind In Swoop (runner-up in the Prix de l'Arc de Triomphe) in an eight-runner field which also included Ebaiyra (Prix Corrida), Baron Samedi (Belmont Gold Cup Stakes), Gold Trip (Prix Greffulhe), Kaspar (Grosser Preis der Badischen Wirtschaft), Ambition (Prix Corrida) and the Czech challenger Nagano Gold. Ridden by Colin Keane, Broome took the lead soon after the start and was never headed, staying on well in the straight to win by a length and a nose from Ebaiyra and Gold Trip. After the race Keane, who was riding at the track for the first time, said "Speaking to Aidan beforehand he said to keep it pretty simple. If no one was happy to go he said to make you're the one running. He's a very uncomplicated horse, very genuine and stays well. When nothing was going on, I was happy to let my lad roll along. I had a willing partner. He pricked his ears and was taking me the whole way and galloped right to the line."

In the King George VI and Queen Elizabeth Stakes on firm ground at Ascot on 24 July Broome led for most of the way but was overtaken in the straight and faded to come home fourth of the five runners behind Adayar, Mishriff and Love.

In December 2023, it was reported that Broome had been retired to Celikoglu Stud, in Turkey.

== Pedigree ==
Pedigree of Broome (IRE), bay stallion, 2016
Sire Australia (IRE) 2011	Galileo (IRE); 1998	Sadler's Wells (USA)	Northern Dancer (CAN)
Sire Australia (IRE) 2011	Galileo (IRE); 1998	Sadler's Wells (USA)	Fairy Bridge
Sire Australia (IRE) 2011	Galileo (IRE); 1998	Urban Sea (USA)	Miswaki
Sire Australia (IRE) 2011	Galileo (IRE); 1998	Urban Sea (USA)	Allegretta (GB)
Sire Australia (IRE) 2011	Ouija Board (GB); 2001	Cape Cross (IRE)	Green Desert (USA)
Sire Australia (IRE) 2011	Ouija Board (GB); 2001	Cape Cross (IRE)	Park Appeal
Sire Australia (IRE) 2011	Ouija Board (GB); 2001	Selection Board	Welsh Pageant (FR)
Sire Australia (IRE) 2011	Ouija Board (GB); 2001	Selection Board	Ouija
Dam Sweepstake (IRE) 2005	Acclamation (GB); 1999	Royal Applause	Waajib (IRE)
Dam Sweepstake (IRE) 2005	Acclamation (GB); 1999	Royal Applause	Flying Melody (IRE)
Dam Sweepstake (IRE) 2005	Acclamation (GB); 1999	Princess Athena (IRE)	Ahonoora (GB)
Dam Sweepstake (IRE) 2005	Acclamation (GB); 1999	Princess Athena (IRE)	Shopping Wise
Dam Sweepstake (IRE) 2005	Dust Flicker (GB); 1999	Suave Dancer (USA)	Green Dancer
Dam Sweepstake (IRE) 2005	Dust Flicker (GB); 1999	Suave Dancer (USA)	Suavite
Dam Sweepstake (IRE) 2005	Dust Flicker (GB); 1999	Galaxie Dust (USA)	Blushing Groom (FR)
Dam Sweepstake (IRE) 2005	Dust Flicker (GB); 1999	Galaxie Dust (USA)	High Galaxie (Family: 1-c)
