= Siskin (horse) =

American-bred Thoroughbred racehorse

- Racing silks of Khalid Abdullah
- Sire: First Defence
- Grandsire: Unbridled's Song
- Dam: Bird Flown
- Damsire: Oasis Dream
- Sex: Stallion
- Foaled: 25 February 2017
- Country: United States
- Colour: Bay or brown
- Breeder: Juddmonte Farms
- Owner: Khalid Abdullah
- Trainer: Ger Lyons
- Record: 8: 5-0-1
- Earnings: £441,942

Major wins
- Marble Hill Stakes (2019); Railway Stakes (2019); Phoenix Stakes (2019); Irish 2000 Guineas (2020)

Siskin (foaled 25 February 2017) is an American-bred Irish-trained Thoroughbred racehorse. He was one of the best juveniles in Europe in 2019 when he won his first four races including the Marble Hill Stakes, Railway Stakes and Phoenix Stakes. He maintained his unbeaten record on his three-year-old debut when he took the Irish 2000 Guineas but suffered his first defeat when facing older horses for the first time in the Sussex Stakes. At the end of the year he was retired from racing and exported to Japan to become a breeding stallion.

== Background ==
Siskin is a dark bay or brown stallion bred in Kentucky by his owner Khalid Abullah's Juddmonte Farms. The horse was sent to race in Europe and entered training with Ger Lyons at Dunsany, County Meath in Ireland.

He was sired by First Defence, who recorded his biggest win when taking the Forego Stakes over seven furlongs on dirt at Saratoga Race Course in 2008. As a breeding stallion he is best known as the sire of Close Hatches.

Siskin's dam Bird Flown showed modest racing ability, winning one minor race from five starts in France, but was a half-sister to the dam of Close Hatches. Her dam Silver Star was a full-sister to Xaar and one of numerous major winners descended from the American broodmare Best In Show (foaled 1965).

== Racing career ==
=== 2019: two-year-old season ===
Siskin was ridden in all of his races as a juvenile by Colin Keane. On his racecourse debut, the colt started at odds of 2/1 for a minor race over six furlongs at Naas Racecourse on 11 May and won "comfortably" as he took the lead in the last quarter mile and came home two and three quarter lengths clear of the Aidan O'Brien-trained Harpocrates. Thirteen days later the colt was stepped up in class for the Listed Marble Hill Stakes at the Curragh and started the 11/8 favourite ahead of four opponents headed by Harpocrates and his stablemate King Neptune (winner of the First Flier Stakes). After tracking the leaders Siskin took the lead a furlong from the finish and accelerated away from the field to win by two and a half lengths. Ger Lyons commented "He's very straightforward and has been from day one. I'd love to tell you how difficult it is to train him and how brilliant I am, but it's push button stuff when you have horses like this. He has a fantastic temperament".

On 29 June at the Curragh Siskin moved up to Group 2 class and was made the 4/6 favourite for the Railway Stakes. The best of his four opponents appeared to be the Aidan O'Brien-trained pair Monarch of Egypt and Fort Myers. Keane settled the favourite in third place behind Fort Myers and Romero before sending him to the front with a furlong and a half left to run. Siskin went clear of the field and won "easily" by two and a half lengths from Monarch of Egypt despite being eased down in the final strides.

The Group 1 Phoenix Stakes, which was run over six furlongs on soft ground at the Curragh on 9 August, saw Siskin start the 10/11 favourite ahead of Monarch of Egypt, with the other three runners being Royal Lytham (July Stakes), Mount Fuji and Think Big. After settling in a close fourth place, Siskin moved up to take the lead approaching the final furlong and kept of well to win by three quarters of a length and a head from Monarch of Egypt and Royal Lytham. After the race Lyons said "My confidence was shot all week with the rain, purely because we knew he was better on a faster gallop. His forte is that burst of speed that he still showed there. I think he's a very smart horse".

Siskin bypassed the seven furlong National Stakes and was instead sent to England for the Middle Park Stakes over six furlongs at Newmarket on 28 September. He was strongly fancied for the race but was withdrawn after becoming highly agitated and rearing up in the starting stalls. Khalid Abdullah's racing manager Teddy Grimthorpe said "We’ve got no really good explanation... For that suddenly to happen is bizarre... He just flipped."

In the official rating of European two-year-olds for 2019 Siskin was rated the seventh-best juvenile of the year, fourteen pounds inferior to Pinatubo.

=== 2020: three-year-old season ===
The flat racing season in Ireland was disrupted by the COVID-19 pandemic and the Irish 2000 Guineas was run three weeks later than usual on 12 June at the Curragh with no spectators allowed. Siskin, making his first appearance for more than ten months, started the 2/1 favourite in a race which saw a six-horse entry from O'Brien's Ballydoyle stable (described by Ger Lyons as a "football team") comprising Armory (Futurity Stakes, Lope Y Fernandez (Round Tower Stakes), Royal Lytham (July Stakes), Monarch of Egypt, Vatican City and Fort Myers (Star Appeal Stakes). The other four runners were Sinawann (runner-up in the Juvenile Stakes), Fiscal Rules, Free Solo and Rebel Tale. Siskin settled in seventh place as Fort Myers and Royal Lytham set the pace, and was switched to the left in the last quarter mile, bumping Armory as he did so, after struggling to obtain a clear run. Lope Y Fernandez took the lead but Siskin accelerated gain the advantage inside the final furlong and won by one and three quarter lengths from Vatican City. After an inquiry by the racecourse stewards the result was unaltered. Lyons, who was winning his first Classic race commented "This means everything, it means 30 years' hard graft for everybody - to win a Guineas was always my number one and hopefully it's the first of many... That was hard work and full credit to Colin Keane. You don't get a Guineas handed to you and they both stood up when it was needed. If there was a kink in that horse then he wasn't going to go through that gap."

On 29 July Siskin was sent to England for the Sussex Stakes at Goodwood Racecourse in which he was matched against older horses for the first time. He started the 9/4 favourite but sustained his first defeat as he was beaten into third place behind the four-year-olds Mohaather and Circus Maximus beaten one and a quarter lengths by the winner. For his next start the colt traveled to France contest the Prix du Moulin over 1600 metres at Longchamp Racecourse but failed to reproduce his best form as he finished a well-beaten fourth of the six runners behind Persian King. On his final racecourse appearance Siskin started at odds of 8/1 for the Breeders' Cup Mile at Keeneland on 7 November. He never looked likely to win and came home ninth behind the upset winner Order of Australia.

At the end of the year it was announced that Siskin had been retired from racing and had been sold to stand as a breeding stallion in Japan.

In the 2020 World's Best Racehorse Rankings, Siskin was rated on 119, making him the equal 57th best racehorse in the world.

== Stud career ==
Siskin began his stud career at the Shadai Stallion Station on Hokkaido with an initial fee of ¥3.5 million (approximately £26,000/€29,000). He covered 20 mares in 2021.

=== Notable progeny ===
c = colt, f = filly
bold = G1/Jpn1 stakes

Foaled	Name	Sex	Major Wins
2023	Master Soarer	f	Shion Stakes
2023	Rock Ptarmigan	c	Keihin Hai
2024	Blue Jay	c	Keio Hai Nisai Stakes
2024	G T Maika	f	Chukyo Nisai Stakes

== Pedigree ==
Pedigree of Siskin (USA), bay or brown stallion, 2017
Sire First Defence (USA) 2004	Unbridled's Song (USA); 1993	Unbridled	Fappiano
Sire First Defence (USA) 2004	Unbridled's Song (USA); 1993	Unbridled	Gana Facil
Sire First Defence (USA) 2004	Unbridled's Song (USA); 1993	Trolley Song	Caro (IRE)
Sire First Defence (USA) 2004	Unbridled's Song (USA); 1993	Trolley Song	Lucky Spell
Sire First Defence (USA) 2004	Honest Lady (USA); 1996	Seattle Slew	Bold Reasoning
Sire First Defence (USA) 2004	Honest Lady (USA); 1996	Seattle Slew	My Charmer
Sire First Defence (USA) 2004	Honest Lady (USA); 1996	Toussaud	El Gran Senor
Sire First Defence (USA) 2004	Honest Lady (USA); 1996	Toussaud	Image of Reality
Dam Bird Flown (GB) 2011	Oasis Dream (GB); 2000	Green Desert (USA)	Danzig
Dam Bird Flown (GB) 2011	Oasis Dream (GB); 2000	Green Desert (USA)	Foreign Courier
Dam Bird Flown (GB) 2011	Oasis Dream (GB); 2000	Hope (IRE)	Dancing Brave (USA)
Dam Bird Flown (GB) 2011	Oasis Dream (GB); 2000	Hope (IRE)	Bahamian
Dam Bird Flown (GB) 2011	Silver Star (GB); 1996	Zafonic (USA)	Gone West
Dam Bird Flown (GB) 2011	Silver Star (GB); 1996	Zafonic (USA)	Zaizafon
Dam Bird Flown (GB) 2011	Silver Star (GB); 1996	Monroe (USA)	Sir Ivor
Dam Bird Flown (GB) 2011	Silver Star (GB); 1996	Monroe (USA)	Best In Show (Family: 8-f)
