= Marble Hill Stakes =

Flat horse race in Ireland

Marble Hill Stakes
2021
Castle Star	Masseto	Strapped

Previous years
2020
Minaun	Arctician	Military Style
2019
Siskin	King Neptune	Harpocrates
2018
Fairyland	Van Beethoven	Land Force
2017
Brother Bear	Would Be King	U S Navy Flag
2016
Caravaggio	Mister Trader	Ambiguity
2015
Round Two	Washington DC	Black Beach
2014
Cappella Sansevero	Sors	Primo Uomo
2013
Coach House	Club Wexford	Abbakova
2012
Cay Verde	Dylanbaru	Infanta Branca
2011
Power	Tough As Nails	Fire Lily

2010-2001
2010
Samuel Morse	Purple Glow	So Stylish
2009
Wrong Answer	Foolish Ambition	Air Chief Marshal
2008
Heart Shaped	Silver Shoon	Pasar Silbano
2007
Pencil Hill	You'resothrilling	Tuscan Evening
2006
Drayton	King Of Swords	Little White Lie
2005
Waterways	Ba Foxtrot	Sandie
2004
Russian Blue	L'Altro Mondo	Kay Two
2003
Newton	Moon Unit	Steel Light
2002
Marino Marini	Luminata	Petite Histoire
2001
Mahsusie	Keepers Hill	Wiseman's Ferry

2000-1991
2000
Pyrus	Coney Kitty	Gallito Castao
1999
Fasliyev	Desert Sky	Appalachia
1998
Access All Areas	Coralita	Valentine Waltz
1997
Golden Mirage	Hopping Higgins	Dixie Dynamo
1996
Raphane	Nevada	Petite Princess
1995
Nashcash	Sagar Pride	Zebra Stripes
1994
Soreze	Petite Fantasy	Duke Of Aragon
1993
The Puzzler	Corinado	Long Gallery
1992
Tahdeed	Almond Flower	Hideout
1991
Maledetto	Safety Tactic	Dedicated Lady

1990-1988
1990
Grand Morning	Arranvanna	Jambo Jambo
1989
Regal Peace	Tanwi	Music Prospector
1988
Blasted Heath	Superb Start	Dominatus

The Marble Hill Stakes is a Group 3 flat horse race in Ireland open to thoroughbreds aged two years only. It is run at the Curragh over a distance of 6 furlongs (1,207 metres), and it is scheduled to take place each year in May.

The race has been run since 1967. It was run over 5 furlongs prior to 2017. It was previously run as a Listed race before being upgraded to Group 3 from the 2020 running.

== Records ==
Leading jockey (5 wins):

- Mick Kinane - Golden Mirage (1997), Fasliyev (1999), Pyrus (2000), Marino Marini (2002), Newton (2003)

Leading trainer (14 wins):

- Aidan O'Brien - Fasliyev (1999), Pyrus (2000), Marino Marini (2002), Newton (2003), Russian Blue (2004), Heart Shaped (2008), Samuel Morse (2010), Power (2011), Coach House (2013), Caravaggio (2016), Fairyland (2019), Blackbeard (2022), Albert Einstein (2025), Great Barrier Reef (2026)

== Winners since 1988 ==
Year	Winner	Jockey	Trainer	Time
1988	Blasted Heath	Pat Shanahan	Michael Kauntze	1:0.50
1989	Regal Peace	John Reid	John J McLoughlin	1:1.60
1990	Grand Morning	Pat Eddery	Patrick Prendergast	59.40
1991	Maledetto	Christy Roche	Jim Bolger	1:0.40
1992	Tahdeed	Christy Roche	Jim Bolger	1:3.00
1993	The Puzzler	Warren O'Connor	Michael Kauntze	1:0.90
1994	Soreze	Pat Gilson	Con Collins	1:06.10
1995	Nashcash	Pat Gilson	Con Collins	1:02.70
1996	Raphane	Kevin Darley	Con Collins	0:58.70
1997	Golden Mirage	Michael Kinane	Mick Channon	1:02.20
1998	Access All Areas	Pat Smullen	John Mulhern	0:59.40
1999	Fasliyev	Michael Kinane	Aidan O'Brien	0:59.20
2000	Pyrus	Michael Kinane	Aidan O'Brien	1:00.60
2001	Mahsusie	Johnny Murtagh	Francis Ennis	1:01.50
2002	Marino Marini	Michael Kinane	Aidan O'Brien	1:04.80
2003	Newton	Michael Kinane	Aidan O'Brien	1:00.90
2004	Russian Blue	Jamie Spencer	Aidan O'Brien	1:01.30
2005	Waterways	Niall McCullagh	Patrick Prendergast	0:59.90
2006	Drayton	Wayne Lordan	Tommy Stack	1:06.00
2007	Pencil Hill	Pat Shanahan	Tracey Collins	0:58.80
2008	Heart Shaped	Johnny Murtagh	Aidan O'Brien	1:01.30
2009	Wrong Answer	Chris Hayes	Kevin Prendergast	1:03.92
2010	Samuel Morse	Johnny Murtagh	Aidan O'Brien	0:59.76
2011	Power	Seamie Heffernan	Aidan O'Brien	0:59.39
2012	Cay Verde	Richard Hughes	Mick Channon	0:59.66
2013	Coach House	Joseph O'Brien	Aidan O'Brien	1:00.44
2014	Cappella Sansevero	Gary Carroll	Ger Lyons	1:04.69
2015	Round Two	Kevin Manning	Jim Bolger	1:00.77
2016	Caravaggio	Ryan Moore	Aidan O'Brien	1:02.22
2017	Brother Bear	Colm O'Donoghue	Jessica Harrington	1:16.51
2018	Fairyland	Seamie Heffernan	Aidan O'Brien	1:13.20
2019	Siskin	Colin Keane	Ger Lyons	1:12.65
2020	Minaun (Note: The 2020 race was run at Cork in July due to the COVID-19 pandemic in the Republic of Ireland)	Chris Hayes	Henry de Bromhead	1:10.55
2021	Castle Star	Chris Hayes	Fozzy Stack	1:14.88
2022	Blackbeard	Ryan Moore	Aidan O'Brien	1:14.72
2023	Givemethebeatboys	Shane Foley	Jessica Harrington	1:14.81
2024	Arizona Blaze	David Egan	Adrian Murray	1:14.70
2025	Albert Einstein	Ryan Moore	Aidan O'Brien	1:11.08
2026	Great Barrier Reef	Ryan Moore	Aidan O'Brien	1:11.33

== See also ==
- Horse racing in Ireland
- List of Irish flat horse races
