= Mohaather =

British-bred Thoroughbred racehorse

- Racing silks of Hamdan Al Maktoum
- Sire: Showcasing
- Grandsire: Oasis Dream
- Dam: Roodeye
- Damsire: Inchinor
- Sex: Colt
- Foaled: 26 April 2016
- Country: United Kingdom
- Colour: Bay
- Breeder: Gaie Johnson Houghton
- Owner: Hamdan Al Maktoum
- Trainer: Marcus Tregoning
- Record: 8: 5-1-0
- Earnings: £287,756

Major wins
- Horris Hill Stakes (2018); Greenham Stakes (2019); Summer Mile Stakes (2020); Sussex Stakes (2020)

Mohaather (foaled 26 April 2016) is a British Thoroughbred racehorse. He showed considerable promise as a juvenile in 2018 when he won two of his three races including the Horris Hill Stakes. In the following year he won the Greenham Stakes on his seasonal debut but then sustained an injury which restricted him to only one subsequent start that season. As a four-year-old he emerged as a top-class miler, taking the Summer Mile Stakes and the Sussex Stakes before injury ended his racing career.

== Background ==
Mohaather is a dark bay horse with a white star bred in England by Gaie Johnson Houghton. As a yearling in 2017 he was consigned to the Tattersalls October Sale and was bought for 110,000 guineas by Hamdan Al Maktoum's Shadwell Estate. He was sent into training with Marcus Tregoning at Whitsbury in Hampshire. Speaking of his initial impressions, Tregoning later said "I went to look at him and thought he was quite small, but thought we'll give it a go as Angus Gold (Hamdan Al Maktoum's racing manager) is a good judge and we liked the horse's pedigree".

He was from the fifth crop of foals sired by Showcasing, a stallion who won two of his seven races including the 2009 edition of the Gimcrack Stakes. His other foals have included Quiet Reflection, Advertise, Toocoolforschool (Mill Reef Stakes), Prize Exhibit (San Clemente Handicap), Tasleet (Greenham Stakes) and Cappella Sansevero (Round Tower Stakes).

Mohaather's dam Roodeye showed modest racing ability, winning two minor races from eighteen starts, but did better as a broodmare, producing several other winners including Roodle, the dam of Accidental Agent and Mohaather's full brother Prize Exhibit. She was distantly descended in the female line from Satanella (foaled 1941) a British broodmare whose descendants have included Chief Singer, Pleasantly Perfect and Winged Love.

== Racing career ==
=== 2018: two-year-old season ===
On his racecourse debut Mohaather started a 16/1 outsider for a maiden race over six furlongs at Newbury Racecourse on 21 September in which he was ridden by Andrea Atzeni and came home second of the twelve runners, beaten three and three quarter lengths by the winner Breath of Air. On 10 October he was ridden by Jim Crowley when he started at odds of 5/1 for a novice race (for horses with no more than two previous wins) over the same distance at Nottingham Racecourse and recorded his first victory as he took the lead approaching the final furlong and prevailed from Alfred Boucher and Swindler in a three-way photo-finish. Seventeen days later the colt was stepped up in class and distance to contest the Group 3 Horris Hill Stakes over seven furlongs at Newbury in which he was partnered by Martin Dwyer and went off the 33/1 outsider in a field of eight. After racing towards the rear and looking unlikely to obtain a clear run two furlongs out he gained the advantage from the front-running Alzano inside the final furlong and won "comfortably" by one and a half lengths.

=== 2019: three-year-old season ===
On 13 April 2019 Mohaather began his second campaign in the Greenham Stakes (a trial race for the 2000 Guineas) over seven furlongs at Newbury in which he was ridden by Crowley and went off the 9/2 fourth choice in the betting behind Hello Youmzain, Boitron (winner of the Washington Singer Stakes) and Great Scot (Ascendant Stakes). After tracking the leaders Mohaather went to the front approaching the final furlong and despite hanging right and then left in the closing stages won "readily" by three quarters of a length from Great Scot. After the race Tregoning commented "I was very confident. He was very fit. I gave him his first bit of work back on January 29. I did that in case we had a hold-up, but we've had a clear run and I'd have been hugely disappointed if he hadn't been thereabouts today. I saw brilliance today for the first time with him and there was never really any doubt." Two weeks later Hamdan Al Maktoum's racing manager Angus Gold announced that the colt had sustained an injury to his right foreleg and would be off the track until autumn.

Mohaather eventually returned in the Group 1 Queen Elizabeth II Stakes over one mile on heavy ground at Ascot Racecourse on 19 October. With Crowley in the saddle he started a 16/1 outsider and kept on well from the rear of the field to finish fifth behind King of Change, The Revenant, Safe Voyage and Veracious.

=== 2020: four-year-old season ===
The flat racing season in Britain and Ireland was disrupted by the COVID-19 outbreak and Mohaather did not make his reappearance until 16 June when he contested the Queen Anne Stakes which was run behind closed doors at Royal Ascot. He finished seventh behind Circus Maximus staying on well in the closing stages after being unable to obtain a clear run in the last quarter mile. On 11 July, over the same course and distance, the colt started the 2/1 favourite for the Group 2 Summer Mile Stakes in which he was ridden by Dane O'Neill. After racing in mid-division he took the lead approaching the final furlong and drew away from his opponents to win in "impressive" style by three and three quarter lengths from San Donato. Marcus Tregoning commented "he's won it with a lot in hand to suggest he gets the mile really well... We had to come back to Ascot as obviously he got no run in the Queen Anne. It was just the way the race panned out... We've got a good horse here and he's going to be aimed at the top mile races like the Sussex. We'll probably go to Goodwood."

As Tregoning had predicted, Mohaather made his next appearance in the Group 1 Sussex Stakes over one mile at Goodwood on 29 July. With Crowley in the saddle he started the 3/1 second favourite behind Siskin in a seven-runner field which also included Circus Maximus, San Donato, Kameko, Wichita (second in the 2000 Guineas) and Vatican City (second in the Irish 2,000 Guineas). Mohaather settled behind the leaders as Circus Maximus set the pace from Vatican City but when the field bunched up early in the straight he appeared to be boxed in and unlikely to find room to race forcing Crowley to pullthe colt back to the rear and then switch to the left to make his challenge on the outside. Mohaather made rapid progress in the final furlong, overtook Circus Maximus in the last strides and won "cosily" by three quarters of a length. Tregoning, who was winning his first Group 1 since Sir Percy took the 2006 Epsom Derby said "I've had to wait a long time, but we haven't had the horses. When we left Lambourn in 2013 we didn't have very many and it was like starting from the beginning again. Luckily, Sheikh Hamdan supported me... It was a tactical race and we thought it would be. I don't blame anyone for that; it's just racing. He struggled to get out as he's not the biggest, but Jim kept his calm and the horse has that massive kick. He's very impressive and if he'd got out earlier he'd have won easily— he won easily anyway!"

On 25 August it was announced that Mohaather had sustained a serious training injury, described "significant bone bruising to his near-hind fetlock", and had been retired from racing.

In the 2020 World's Best Racehorse Rankings, Mohaather was rated on 124, making him the equal tenth best racehorse in the world.

== Pedigree ==
Pedigree of Mohaather (GB), bay colt, 2016
Sire Showcasing (GB) 2007	Oasis Dream; 2000	Green Desert (USA)	Danzig
Sire Showcasing (GB) 2007	Oasis Dream; 2000	Green Desert (USA)	Foreign Courier
Sire Showcasing (GB) 2007	Oasis Dream; 2000	Hope (IRE)	Dancing Brave (USA)
Sire Showcasing (GB) 2007	Oasis Dream; 2000	Hope (IRE)	Bahamian
Sire Showcasing (GB) 2007	Arabesque; 1997	Zafonic (USA)	Gone West
Sire Showcasing (GB) 2007	Arabesque; 1997	Zafonic (USA)	Zaizafon
Sire Showcasing (GB) 2007	Arabesque; 1997	Prophecy (IRE)	Warning (GB)
Sire Showcasing (GB) 2007	Arabesque; 1997	Prophecy (IRE)	Andaleeb (USA)
Dam Roodeye (GB) 2002	Inchinor (GB); 1990	Ahonoora	Lorenzaccio
Dam Roodeye (GB) 2002	Inchinor (GB); 1990	Ahonoora	Helen Nichols
Dam Roodeye (GB) 2002	Inchinor (GB); 1990	Inchmurrin (IRE)	Lomond (USA)
Dam Roodeye (GB) 2002	Inchinor (GB); 1990	Inchmurrin (IRE)	On Show (GB)
Dam Roodeye (GB) 2002	Roo (GB); 1997	Rudimentary (USA)	Nureyev
Dam Roodeye (GB) 2002	Roo (GB); 1997	Rudimentary (USA)	Doubly Sure (GB)
Dam Roodeye (GB) 2002	Roo (GB); 1997	Shall We Run	Hotfoot
Dam Roodeye (GB) 2002	Roo (GB); 1997	Shall We Run	Sirnelta (FR) (Family: 14-c)
