= Rebelline =

Irish-bred Thoroughbred racehorse

- Sire: Robellino
- Grandsire: Roberto
- Dam: Fleeting Rainbow
- Damsire: Rainbow Quest
- Sex: Mare
- Foaled: 29 April 1998
- Country: Ireland
- Colour: Bay
- Breeder: Peter Tellwright
- Owner: Lady O'Reilly
- Trainer: Kevin Prendergast
- Record: 11: 6-1-1

Major wins
- Leopardstown 1,000 Guineas Trial (2001); Pretty Polly Stakes (2001); Gladness Stakes (2002); Mooresbridge Stakes (2002); Tattersalls Gold Cup (2002)

Rebelline (foaled 29 April 1998) was an Irish Thoroughbred racehorse and broodmare. She won six of her eleven races in a racing career which lasted from October 2000 until May 2002. As a juvenile she won on her debut and then finished second to Vinnie Roe in the Eyrefield Stakes. In the following year she won the Leopardstown 1,000 Guineas Trial and the Pretty Polly Stakes as well as finishing third in the Prix de l'Opéra. She reached her peak as a four-year-old in 2002 when she was undefeated in three starts, taking the Gladness Stakes, Mooresbridge Stakes and Tattersalls Gold Cup. After her retirement from racing she had considerable success as a dam of winners.

== Background ==
Rebelline is a bay mare with no white markings bred in Ireland by Peter Tellwright of the British-based Tyrley Castle Stud. As a foal in December 1999 the filly was offered for sale at Tattersalls and was sold for 28,000 guineas. She returned to the sales ring as a yearling at Goffs in October 1999 and was bought for IR£68,000 by Lady O'Reilly's Castlemartin Stud. She was sent into training with Kevin Prendergast and was ridden in all of her races by Declan McDonogh.

She was sired by Robellino, a son of Roberto, who won the Royal Lodge Stakes, and sired several other good winners including Mister Baileys and Royal Rebel. Rebelline's dam Fleeting Rainbow showed little racing ability, failing to win in three races, but did better, a broodmare, producing several other winners including the Blandford Stakes winner Quws. She was descended from the British broodmare Pelting (foaled 1958) who was the ancestor of several other major winners including Moon Ballad, Bassenthwaite, Braashee (Prix Royal-Oak) and Central Park (Italian Derby).

== Racing career ==
=== 2000: two-year-old season ===
Rebelline made her first appearance in a maiden race over one mile at Navan Racecourse on 18 October. Starting at odds of 7/1 in an eighteen-runner field she took the lead inside the final furlong and won by three quarters of a length from the Aidan O'Brien-trained Karsavina. The filly was then stepped up in class for the Listed Eyrefield Stakes at Leopardstown Racecourse on 12 November and finished second of the twenty runners, beaten one and a half lengths by the Dermot Weld-trained colt Vinnie Roe.

=== 2001: three-year-old season ===
On her first appearance as a three-year-old Rebelline contested the 1,000 Guineas Trial over seven furlongs at Leopardstown on 16 April and started 7/2 second favourite behind the highly rated Imagine. After tracking the leaders she went to the front a furlong and a half from the finish, accelerated away from the field and won "easily" by five and a half lengths from the favourite. On 27 May at the Curragh the filly was moved up to Group 1 class and started at odds of 8/1 in a sixteen-runner field for the Irish 1,000 Guineas. She stayed on in the straight without ever looking likely to win and finished fifth behind Imagine, Crystal Music, Toroca and Sequoyah.

Five weeks after her defeat in the Guineas, Rebelline returned to the Curragh and was moved up in distance for the Group 2 Pretty Polly Stakes over ten furlongs. She was the subject of a "massive gamble" in the betting market, being backed down from 9/2 to 2/1 favourite. She raced in second behind the British challenger Heavenly Whisper before going to the front approaching the final furlong and kept on well to win by two lengths from the four-year-old Molomo. After the race Prendergast said "I thought she would win because she was working so well".

The filly started 11/2 third choice in the betting for the Irish Oaks over one and a half miles at the Curragh in July, but never threatened the leaders and finished seventh of the twelve runners, six lengths behind the winner Lailani.

Rebelline was off the course for more than two and a half months before returning in October when she was sent to France to contest the Group 1 Prix de l'Opéra over 2000 metres at Longchamp Racecourse. She finished strongly and took third place, beaten one and a half lengths and two lengths by Terre A Terre and Mot Juste. Two weeks later she started a 16/1 outsider for the Champion Stakes at Newmarket and came home eighth of the twelve runners behind Nayef.

=== 2002: four-year-old season ===
On her four-year-old debut Rebelline was assigned a weight of 136 pounds for the Group 3 Gladness Stakes over seven furlongs at the Curragh on 7 April. She started second choice in the betting behind Johannesburg a three-year-old colt who had won the Breeders' Cup Juvenile in November 2001 and been named champion juvenile in both Europe and the United States. Johannesburg took the lead in the final furlong but Rebelline, after briefly looking unlikely to get a clear run, came from well off the pace to catch the colt in the final strides and win by a short head. Kevin Prendergast commented "Rebelline always goes well fresh and I thought Johannesburg looked ring-rusty before the race. She had a back problem 10 weeks ago but she would have been an unlucky loser had she not got out in time".

Rebelline was then sent to France for the Prix Ganay but was withdrawn from the race when she was found to be in season. On 6 May Rebelline was stepped back up in distance for the Mooresbridge Stakes over ten furlongs at the Curragh, in which she was matched against the St Leger winner Milan. Starting the 5/2 second favourite her task was made considerably easier when Milan was pulled up injured before the straight. She overhauled the front-running Shoal Creek a furlong from the finish and won by three quarters of a length.

The Group 1 Tattersalls Gold Cup at the Curragh on 26 May attracted a field of eight runners and saw Nayef start favourite ahead of Tobougg with Rebelline next in the betting on 7/1 alongside Bach (Royal Whip Stakes). The other four runners were Indian Creek (Earl of Sefton Stakes), Chancellor (Gordon Richards Stakes), Diamond Trim (Finale Stakes) and Chimes At Midnight (Curragh Cup). Bach set the pace with Rebelline settled behind the leaders before turning into the straight in fifth place. After struggling to obtain a clear run, McDonogh switched the filly to the inside and began to make rapid progress in the last quarter mile. Rebelline gained the advantage 75 yards from the finish and broke clear to win by two lengths from Bach with Nayef two and a half lengths back in third. After the race Prendergast described the mare as "a giant-killer". He also explained that Rebelline had suffered from arthritis throughout her racing career and that her fitness had to be maintained by regular swimming sessions rather that conventional training gallops.

Despite hopes that she would return for an autumn campaign, Rebelline never raced again and was retired from racing at the end of the season.

== Breeding record ==
At the end of her racing career, Rebelline was retired to become a broodmare for her owner's Castlemartin Stud. She produced at least ten foals and six winners:

- Regalline, a bay filly, foaled in 2004, sired by Green Desert. Won one race.
- Rockcliffe, bay colt (late gelded), 2005, by King's Best. Failed to win in five races.
- Recharge, bay colt, 2006, by Cape Cross. Won three races including Leopardstown 2,000 Guineas Trial, Glencairn Stakes.
- Pure Science, chestnut colt (gelded), 2008, by Galileo. Won four National Hunt races.
- Redoubtable, bay filly, 2009, by Invincible Spirit. Won one race.
- Rebel Force, bay filly, 2010, by Dalakhani. Won one race.
- I'm Yours, bay filly, 2011, by Invincible Spirit. Won two races including Victor McCalmont Memorial Stakes.
- Digital Rebellion, chestnut colt, 2012, by Dubawi. Failed to win in five races.
- Queen Cordelia, bay filly, 2013, by Acclamation
- Crossing Paths, bay filly, 2014, by Cape Cross

== Pedigree ==
Pedigree of Rebelline (IRE), bay mare, 1998
Sire Robellino (USA) 1978	Roberto (USA); 1969	Hail to Reason	Turn-To
Sire Robellino (USA) 1978	Roberto (USA); 1969	Hail to Reason	Nothirdchance
Sire Robellino (USA) 1978	Roberto (USA); 1969	Bramalea	Nashua
Sire Robellino (USA) 1978	Roberto (USA); 1969	Bramalea	Rarelea
Sire Robellino (USA) 1978	Isobelline (USA); 1971	Pronto	Timor
Sire Robellino (USA) 1978	Isobelline (USA); 1971	Pronto	Proserpina
Sire Robellino (USA) 1978	Isobelline (USA); 1971	Isobella	Bold Ruler
Sire Robellino (USA) 1978	Isobelline (USA); 1971	Isobella	Monarchy
Dam Fleeting Rainbow (GB) 1989	Rainbow Quest (USA); 1981	Blushing Groom	Red God
Dam Fleeting Rainbow (GB) 1989	Rainbow Quest (USA); 1981	Blushing Groom	Runaway Bride
Dam Fleeting Rainbow (GB) 1989	Rainbow Quest (USA); 1981	I Will Follow	Herbager
Dam Fleeting Rainbow (GB) 1989	Rainbow Quest (USA); 1981	I Will Follow	Where You Lead
Dam Fleeting Rainbow (GB) 1989	Taplow (IRE); 1984	Tap On Wood	Sallust
Dam Fleeting Rainbow (GB) 1989	Taplow (IRE); 1984	Tap On Wood	Cat o' Mountaine
Dam Fleeting Rainbow (GB) 1989	Taplow (IRE); 1984	Fighting	Aggressor
Dam Fleeting Rainbow (GB) 1989	Taplow (IRE); 1984	Fighting	Pelting (Family 4-k)
