= Martin Molony Stakes =

Flat horse race in Ireland

Martin Molony Stakes
2026
Layfayette	Chally Chute	Uxmal

Previous years
2025
Uluru	Lemsairbat	Layfayette
2024
Harbour Wind	Dancing Tango	Serious Challenge
2023
Layfayette	Term Of Endearment	Serious Challenge
2022
Earl Of Tyrone	Raise You	Inuit
2021
Sonnyboyliston	Sunchart	Questionare

2020-2011
2020
Oriental Eagle	Pondus	Bold Approach
2019
Dadoozdart	Riven Light	Nickajack Cave
2018
Sir Erec	The King	Twilight Payment
2017
Detailed	Cannonball	Red Stars
2016
Bondi Beach	Altesse	Toe The Line
2015
Answered	Waltzing Matilda	Highly Toxic
2014
Tarana	El Salvador	Inis Meain
2013
Inis Meain	Missunited	Euphrasia
2012
Tannery	Backbench Blues	Defining Year
2011
Bob Le Beau	Unity	Zerashan

2010-2003
2010
Precious Gem	Choose Me	Indiana Gal
2009
Ard Na Greine	Dance Pass	Aliyfa
2008
Dress Rehearsal	Red Moloney	Simawa
2007
Honolulu	Athenian Way	Arch Rebel
2006
Foreign Affairs	Ask Carol	Helena Molony
2005
Behkiyra	Unique Pose	In The Ribbons
2004
Mkuzi	Ivowen	Tarakala
2003
Maharib	Mkuzi	Holy Orders

The Martin Molony Stakes is a Group 3 flat horse race in Ireland open to thoroughbred horses aged four years or older. It is run at Limerick over a distance of 1 mile, 4 furlongs and 110 yards (2,515 metres), and it is scheduled to take place each year in June.

The race was first run in 2003. The race is named in honour of the locally born jockey Martin Molony who won six consecutive Irish jump racing Champion Jockey titles between 1946 and 1951. Prior to 2017 it was run in late April or early May and in 2018 and 2019 it was run in October.

== Records ==
Most successful horse (2 wins):

- Layfayette – 2023, 2026

Leading jockey (3 wins):

- Wayne Lordan – Dress Rehearsal (2008), Tannery (2012), Detailed (2017)
- Chris Hayes - Dadoozdart (2019), Harbour Wind (2024), Uluru (2025)

Leading trainer (3 wins):

- Aidan O'Brien – Honolulu (2007), Bondi Beach (2016), Sir Erec (2018)
- John Oxx – Mkuzi (2004), Behkiyra (2005), Tarana (2014)
- Dermot Weld - Maharib (2003), Precious Gem (2010), Harbour Wind (2024)
- Noel Meade - Dadoozdart (2019), Layfayette (2023, 2026)

== Winners ==
Year	Winner	Age	Jockey	Trainer	Time
2003	Maharib	3	Pat Shanahan	Dermot Weld	2:40.60
2004	Mkuzi	5	Michael Kinane	John Oxx	2:35.50
2005	Behkiyra	3	Fran Berry	John Oxx	2:24.60
2006	Foreign Affairs	8	Declan McDonogh	Sir Mark Prescott	2:34.00
2007	Honolulu	3	Kieren Fallon	Aidan O'Brien	2:33.89
2008	Dress Rehearsal	3	Wayne Lordan	David Wachman	2:29.20
2009	Ard Na Greine	3	Kevin Manning	Jim Bolger	2:25.59
2010	Precious Gem	4	Pat Shanahan	Dermot Weld	2:26.85
2011	Bob Le Beau	4	Fran Berry	Jessica Harrington	2:36.29
2012	Tannery	3	Wayne Lordan	David Wachman	2:37.48
2013	Inis Meain	6	Danny Mullins	Denis Gerard Hogan	2:58.06
2014	Tarana	4	Declan McDonogh	John Oxx	2:52.47
2015	Answered	4	Kevin Manning	Jim Bolger	2:42.16
2016	Bondi Beach	4	Seamie Heffernan	Aidan O'Brien	2:48.59
2017	Detailed	3	Wayne Lordan	Joseph O'Brien	3:02.28
2018	Sir Erec	3	Michael Hussey	Aidan O'Brien	2:56.44
2019	Dadoozdart	3	Chris Hayes	Noel Meade	3:03.05
2020	Oriental Eagle (Note: The 2020 race was run in June due to the COVID-19 pandemic in the Republic of Ireland)	6	Rachael Blackmore	Emmet Mullins	2:48.91
2021	Sonnyboyliston	4	Shane Kelly	Johnny Murtagh	2:42.21
2022	Earl of Tyrone	4	Billy Lee	Paddy Twomey	2:46.52
2023	Layfayette	6	Seamie Heffernan	Noel Meade	2:43.03
2024	Harbour Wind	4	Chris Hayes	Dermot Weld	2:45.72
2025	Uluru	4	Chris Hayes	Joseph O'Brien	2:45.59
2026	Layfayette	9	Adam Caffrey	Noel Meade	2:54.32

== See also ==
- Horse racing in Ireland
- List of Irish flat horse races
