= Marcus Tregoning =

- Born: 31 July 1959 (age 67)
- Occupations: Owner, Marcus Tregoning Racing Ltd
- Known for: Racehorse trainer, horse racing
- Website: marcustregoningracing.co.uk

Marcus Philip Norris Tregoning (born 31 July 1959) is an English Thoroughbred racehorse trainer, based at Whitsbury Manor Stables in Whitsbury, Hampshire. He originally worked as assistant trainer to Dick Hern. Tregoning began training horses by himself in 1997 at Kingwood House Stables at Lambourn in Berkshire, before moving to Whitsbury in 2013. He won the Derby in 2006 with Sir Percy. Other notable horses include Group One winners Nayef, Ekraar, and most recently Mohaather, winner of the Sussex Stakes at Goodwood in 2020.

He is married to Arabella and father of four children.

== Major wins ==
(United Kingdom) Great Britain

- Champion Stakes - (1) - Nayef (2001)
- International Stakes - (1) - Nayef (2002)
- Prince of Wales's Stakes - (1) - Nayef (2003)
- Dewhurst Stakes - (1) - Sir Percy (2005)
- Epsom Derby - (1) - Sir Percy (2006)
- Sussex Stakes - (1) - Mohaather (2020)

United Arab Emirates

- Dubai Sheema Classic - (1) - Nayef (2002)

Italy

- Gran Premio del Jockey Club – (1) – Ekraar (2003)
