= Order of Australia (horse) =

Irish-bred Thoroughbred racehorse

- Sire: Australia
- Grandsire: Galileo
- Dam: Senta's Dream
- Damsire: Danehill
- Sex: Colt
- Foaled: 18 February 2017
- Country: Ireland
- Colour: Bay
- Breeder: Whisperview Trading Ltd
- Owner: Derrick Smith, Susan Magnier, Michael Tabor & Anne-Marie O'Brien
- Trainer: Aidan O'Brien
- Record: 24: 6-2-4
- Earnings: £1,741,596

Major wins
- Breeders' Cup Mile (2020); Minstrel Stakes (2021, 2022); Irish Thoroughbred Marketing Cup (2023)
- Last updated on 19 February 2023

Order of Australia (foaled 18 February 2017) is an Irish Thoroughbred racehorse. He ran fifth on his only start as a juvenile in 2019 and the following year, he showed promising but unremarkable form over long distances, winning two minor races and finishing fourth in the Irish Derby. In November he was dropped back in distance and recorded an upset victory in the Breeders' Cup Mile.

== Background ==
Order of Australia is a bay colt with a white star and a white sock on his right foreleg bred in Ireland by Whisperview Trading a breeding company owned by Aidan O'Brien and his wife Anne Marie. He entered the ownership of the Coolmore Stud partners Derrick Smith, Susan Magnier, Michael Tabor, and Anne-Marie O'Brien, and was sent into training with Aidan O'Brien at Ballydoyle.

He was from the second crop of foals sired by Australia who won the Epsom Derby, Irish Derby, and International Stakes in 2014. Order of Australia's dam Senta's Dream was an unraced daughter of the top-class racemare Starine. As a broodmare, she also produced Iridessa and Santa Barbara.

== Racing career ==
=== 2019: two-year-old season ===
On his track debut, Order of Australia started a 16/1 outsider in a maiden race over one mile on heavy ground at Naas Racecourse on 3 November. Ridden by Padraig Beggy he never looked likely to win but kept on well in the closing stages to finish fifth of the seventeen runners behind his stablemate Nobel Prize, beaten three and three-quarter lengths by the winner.

=== 2020: three-year-old season ===
The 2020 flat racing season in Europe was disrupted by the COVID-19 pandemic and Order of Australia did not reappear until 9 June when he started at odds of 11/2 for a maiden over ten furlongs at Leopardstown Racecourse and finished third behind his stablemates Tiger Moth and Dawn Patrol. In this race, he was equipped with blinkers which he wore in all his subsequent races that year. Later that month he was stepped up sharply in class to contest the Irish Derby over one and a half miles at the Curragh and came home fourth as a 33/1 outsider, beaten six and a half lengths by the winner Santiago. Seamie Heffernan took over from Beggy when the colt was sent to France for the Prix du Jockey Club over 2100 metres at Chantilly Racecourse on 5 July. Starting a 30/1 outsider, he led for most of the way and kept on well after being headed in the straight but faded in the closing stages and finished seventh behind the English-trained Mishriff.

After a two-month break Order of Australia was then dropped back in class to contest a minor race over a mile and a quarter on the synthetic Polytrack surface at Dundalk Racecourse on 18 September and went off the 11/10 favourite against five opponents. With Heffernan again in the saddle, he recorded his first victory as he took the lead inside the last quarter mile and held on under strong pressure to win by three-quarters of a length from Bolivar. Nine days later he followed up in a similar event over one and a half miles at the Curragh, starting the 6/5 favourite and winning "readily" by three-quarters of a length from Ebendi after gaining the advantage approaching the last quarter mile. On 11 October, he started at odds of 5/1 for the Group 3 International Stakes over ten furlongs at the Curragh but after racing in second place for most of the way he faded badly in the last quarter mile and came home tailed off last of the nine runners.

For his next race Order of Australia was sent to the United States for the Breeders' Cup Mile at Keeneland on 7 November. He was originally among the reserves for the race but found a place in the field when One Master was withdrawn after sustaining a minor training injury. A further change in plan saw Christophe Soumillon who had been booked to ride the colt, test positive for COVID and be replaced by Pierre-Charles Boudot. Kameko started favourite for the race while the other contenders included Siskin, Circus Maximus, Uni (winner of the race in 2019), Ivar (Shadwell Turf Mile Stakes), Raging Bull (Shoemaker Mile Stakes), Digital Age (Turf Classic Stakes) and Halladay (Fourstardave Handicap). Starting a 73/1 outsider Order of Australia broke slowly from the stalls but was rushed forward to settle in fourth place as Halladay set the early pace. He made a forward move approaching the final turn, overtook Halladay a furlong from the finish, and held off the late challenge of Circus Maximus to win by a neck. Lope Y Fernandez came home third to complete a 1-2-3 in the race for Aidan O'Brien. After the race, O'Brien said "We always felt that a mile on fast ground and flat track is what he wanted. We felt maybe we were running him too far. This was the first time he got the conditions he really wanted... no one knew much about this horse. It was the first time for him to ever race at this trip on a track with fast ground" while Boudot said "Aidan told me he is a fast and proper horse. I took a position behind the leaders, and he traveled very nicely, and then he gave me a nice turn of foot."

On 13 December Order of Australia was sent to Sha Tin Racecourse in Hong Kong to contest the Hong Kong Mile over 1600 metre. He was in contention from the start but unable to challenge the leaders in the closing stages and came home sixth behind Golden Sixty, beaten four and three-quarter lengths by the winner.

In the 2020 World's Best Racehorse Rankings, Order of Australia was rated 120, making him the equal 40th best racehorse in the world.

== Pedigree ==
Pedigree of Order of Australia (IRE), bay colt, 2017
Sire Australia (IRE) 2011	Galileo (IRE); 1998	Sadler's Wells (USA)	Northern Dancer (CAN)
Sire Australia (IRE) 2011	Galileo (IRE); 1998	Sadler's Wells (USA)	Fairy Bridge
Sire Australia (IRE) 2011	Galileo (IRE); 1998	Urban Sea (USA)	Miswaki
Sire Australia (IRE) 2011	Galileo (IRE); 1998	Urban Sea (USA)	Allegretta (GB)
Sire Australia (IRE) 2011	Ouija Board (GB); 2001	Cape Cross (IRE)	Green Desert (USA)
Sire Australia (IRE) 2011	Ouija Board (GB); 2001	Cape Cross (IRE)	Park Appeal
Sire Australia (IRE) 2011	Ouija Board (GB); 2001	Selection Board	Welsh Pageant (FR)
Sire Australia (IRE) 2011	Ouija Board (GB); 2001	Selection Board	Ouija
Dam Senta's Dream (GB) 2004	Danehill (USA); 1986	Danzig	Northern Dancer (CAN)
Dam Senta's Dream (GB) 2004	Danehill (USA); 1986	Danzig	Pas de Nom
Dam Senta's Dream (GB) 2004	Danehill (USA); 1986	Razyana	His Majesty
Dam Senta's Dream (GB) 2004	Danehill (USA); 1986	Razyana	Spring Adieu (CAN)
Dam Senta's Dream (GB) 2004	Starine (FR); 1997	Mendocino (USA)	Theatrical (IRE)
Dam Senta's Dream (GB) 2004	Starine (FR); 1997	Mendocino (USA)	Brorita
Dam Senta's Dream (GB) 2004	Starine (FR); 1997	Grisonnante	Kaldoun
Dam Senta's Dream (GB) 2004	Starine (FR); 1997	Grisonnante	Lady Cherie (Family: 4-i)

- Order of Australia was inbred 4 × 4 to Northern Dancer, meaning that this stallion appears twice in the fourth generation of his pedigree.
