= Gladness Stakes =

Flat horse race in Ireland

- Class: Listed
- Location: Curragh Racecourse; County Kildare, Ireland
- Inaugurated: 1963
- Race type: Flat / Thoroughbred
- Sponsor: TRI Equestrian
- Website: Curragh

Race information
- Distance: 7f (1,408 metres)
- Surface: Turf
- Track: Right-hand elbow
- Qualification: Three-years-old and up
- Weight: 8 st 13 lb (3yo); 9 st 11 lb (4yo+); Allowances; 3 lb for fillies and mares Penalties; 5 lb for G1 / G2 winners * 3 lb for G3 winners * * since 1 May last year
- Purse: €50,000 (2021); 1st: €29,500

Gladness Stakes
2026
Big Gossey	East Hampton	Neolithic

Previous years
2024
Yosemite Valley	Jumbly	Mutasarref
2023
Goldana	Mea Domina	Cosmic Vega
2022
Markaz Paname	Sh Boom	Thunder Moon
2021
Lancaster House	Current Option	Know It All

2020-2011
2020
Lancaster House	Speak In Colours	Smash Williams
2019
Imaging	No Needs Never	Le Brivido
2018
Psychedelic Funk	Downforce	Making Light
2017
Diamond Fields	Alice Springs	Blue De Vega
2016
Onenightidreamed	Flight Risk	Joailliere
2015
Flight Risk	Piri Wango	Cable Bay
2014
Sruthan	Custom Cut	Wannabe Better
2013
Custom Cut	Nephrite	La Collina
2012
Excelebration	Croisultan	Windsor Palace
2011
Lolly For Dolly	The Cheka	Luisant

2010-2001
2010
Kargali	Rayeni	Croisultan
2009
Mad About You	Dohasa	Kargali
2008
Jumbajukiba	Major Cadeaux	US Ranger
2007
Mustameet	An Tadh	Marcus Andronicus
2006
Common World	Mustameet	Turnkey
2005
Mustameet	Steenberg	Zarad
2004
Monsieur Bond	Steenberg	Rockets 'n Rollers
2003
Millennium Force	One More Round	Marino Marini
2002
Rebelline	Johannesburg	Shoal Creek
2001
Softly Tread	Social Harmony	Rush Brook

2000-1991
2000
Giant's Causeway	Tarry Flynn	Namid
1999
Two-Twenty-Two	Gaelic Storm	Armilina
1998
Muchea	Chateau Royal	Heed My Warning
1997
Cool Edge	Desert King	Mosconi
1996
Idris	Burden Of Proof	Rainbow Blues
1995
Bin Ajwaad	Ridgewood Ben	Nordic Oak
1994
Ridgewood Ben	College Chapel	Idris
1992
Bezelle	Norwich	Street Rebel
1991
Mr Brooks	Aldbourne	Golden Mintage

1990-1988
1990
Great Lakes	Mr Brooks	Sovereign Wolve
1989
Rose Reef	Secret Appeal	Cielamour
1988
Careafolie	Lake Como	Darcy's Thatcher

The Gladness Stakes is a Listed flat horse race in Ireland open to horses aged three years or older. It is run over a distance of 7 furlongs (1,408 metres) at the Curragh in March or April.

== History ==
The event is named after Gladness, a successful Irish-trained racehorse in the 1950s. It was established in 1963, and was initially contested over 1 mile and 2 furlongs. It was shortened to a mile in 1964, and cut to its present length in 1970.

The Gladness Stakes originally held Listed status. It used to be open to horses aged three or older. It was promoted to Group 3 level in 1987, and closed to three-year-olds in 2004. It was re-opened to three-year-olds from 2014. The race was downgraded to Listed status again from the 2024 running.

== Records ==
Most successful horse (2 wins):

- Mustameet – 2005, 2007
- Lancaster House – 2020, 2021
- Big Gossey - 2025, 2026

Leading jockey (4 wins):

- George McGrath – Signa Infesta (1968), Rocked (1969), Pardner (1972), Rare April (1977)

Leading trainer (8 wins):

- Vincent O'Brien – Nijinsky (1970), Minsky (1971), Dapper (1973), Apalachee (1974), Night Alert (1980), Lomond (1983), El Gran Senor (1984), Great Lakes (1990)

== Winners since 1981 ==
Year	Winner	Age	Jockey	Trainer	Time
1981	Prince Echo	3	Stephen Craine	Liam Browne
1982	Kilian	4	Raymond Carroll	David O'Brien
1983	Lomond	3	Pat Eddery	Vincent O'Brien
1984	El Gran Senor	3	Pat Eddery	Vincent O'Brien
1985	Caparison	5	Donal Manning	Mick O'Toole
1986	Lidhame	4	Gabriel Curran	Kevin Prendergast	1:30.10
1987	Grey Goddess	4	Stephen Craine	Edward O'Grady	1:34.20
1988	Careafolie	3	Michael Kinane	Dermot Weld	1:31.00
1989	Rose Reef	5	Ron Quinton	John Oxx	1:36.90
1990	Great Lakes	4	John Reid	Vincent O'Brien	1:25.10
1991	Mr Brooks	4	Pat Shanahan	Kevin Connolly	1:31.10
1992	Bezelle	3	Pat Shanahan	Con Collins	1:32.60
1993	no race
1994	Ridgewood Ben	3	Michael Kinane	John Oxx	1:36.30
1995	Bin Ajwaad	5	Pat Eddery	Ben Hanbury	1:28.90
1996	Idris	6	Kevin Manning	Jim Bolger	1:28.70
1997	Cool Edge	6	Nigel Day	Mark Tompkins	1:25.80
1998	Muchea	4	Richard Hughes	Mick Channon	1:37.20
1999	Two-Twenty-Two	4	Pat Smullen	Dermot Weld	1:28.80
2000	Giant's Causeway	3	Michael Kinane	Aidan O'Brien	1:30.10
2001	Softly Tread	3	Pat Shanahan	Con Collins	1:38.30
2002	Rebelline	4	Declan McDonogh	Kevin Prendergast	1:31.70
2003	Millennium Force	5	Chris Catlin	Mick Channon	1:24.00
2004	Monsieur Bond	4	Fergal Lynch	Bryan Smart	1:28.50
2005	Mustameet	4	Declan McDonogh	Kevin Prendergast	1:32.50
2006	Common World	7	Fran Berry	Tom Hogan	1:35.90
2007	Mustameet	6	Declan McDonogh	Kevin Prendergast	1:24.20
2008	Jumbajukiba	5	Fran Berry	Jessica Harrington	1:36.61
2009	Mad About You	4	Pat Smullen	Dermot Weld	1:27.59
2010	Kargali	5	Johnny Murtagh	Luke Comer	1:33.03
2011	Lolly for Dolly	4	Wayne Lordan	Tommy Stack	1:30.95
2012	Excelebration	4	Joseph O'Brien	Aidan O'Brien	1:31.37
2013	Custom Cut	4	Ronan Whelan	George Kent	1:32.92
2014	Sruthan	4	Chris Hayes	Paul Deegan	1:28.40
2015	Flight Risk	4	Kevin Manning	Jim Bolger	1:29.46
2016	Onenightidreamed	5	Wayne Lordan	Tommy Stack	1:37.50
2017	Diamond Fields (Note: The 2017, 2018 and 2019 races took place at Naas due to redevelopment work at The Curragh.)	4	Chris Hayes	Fozzy Stack	1:30.05
2018	Psychedelic Funk	4	Colin Keane	Ger Lyons	1:34.97
2019	Imaging	4	Oisin Orr	Dermot Weld	1:28.25
2020	Lancaster House (Note: The 2020 race was run in June due to the COVID-19 pandemic in the Republic of Ireland)	4	Seamie Heffernan	Aidan O'Brien	1:24.11
2021	Lancaster House	5	Ryan Moore	Aidan O'Brien	1:25.36
2022	Markaz Paname	3	Colin Keane	Ger Lyons	1:29.11
2023	Goldana	4	Dylan Browne McMonagle	Joseph O'Brien	1:34.17
2024	Yosemite Valley	4	Gavin Ryan	Donnacha O'Brien	1:31.65
2025	Big Gossey	8	Billy Lee	Charles O'Brien	1:31.62
2026	Big Gossey	9	Billy Lee	Charles O'Brien	1:33.71

== Earlier winners ==
- 1963: Christmas Island
- 1964: Khalkis
- 1965: Western Wind
- 1966: Not So Cold
- 1967: Sparrow Hawk
- 1968: Signa Infesta
- 1969: Rocked
- 1970: Nijinsky
- 1971: Minsky
- 1972: Pardner
- 1973: Dapper
- 1974: Apalachee
- 1975: It's Freezing
- 1976: Sovereign Dice
- 1977: Rare April
- 1978: Icelandic
- 1979: Secret of Success
- 1980: Night Alert

== See also ==
- Horse racing in Ireland
- List of Irish flat horse races
