= Mooresbridge Stakes =

Flat horse race in Ireland

- Class: Group 2
- Location: Curragh Racecourse; County Kildare, Ireland
- Race type: Flat / Thoroughbred
- Sponsor: Coolmore Stud
- Website: Curragh

Race information
- Distance: 1m 2f (2,012 metres)
- Surface: Turf
- Track: Right-handed
- Qualification: Four-years-old and up
- Weight: 9 st 5 lb Allowances; 3 lb for fillies and mares Penalties; 3 lb for G1 winners * * since 1 September last year
- Purse: €120,000 (2024); 1st: €70,800

Mooresbridge Stakes
2026
Minnie Hauk	Edward Hamilton	Adelaide River

Previous years
2025
Los Angeles	White Birch	Trustyourinstinct
2024
White Birch	Lord Massusus	Greenland
2023
Visualisation	Layfayette	Piz Badile
2022
Layfayette	Bear Story	Visualisation
2021
Broome	Helvic Dream	Twilight Payment

2020-2011
2020
Leo De Fury	Fleeting	Numerian
2019
Magical	Flag Of Honour	The King
2018
Cliffs Of Moher	Success Days	Yucatan
2017
Minding	Moonlight Magic	Brendan Brackan
2016
Found	Success Days	Fascinating Rock
2015
Fascinating Rock	Parish Hall	Waltzing Matilda
2014
Magician	Parish Hall	Hall Of Mirrors
2013
Camelot	Triumphant	Parish Hall
2012
Windsor Palace	St Nicholas Abbey	Sharestan
2011
So You Think	Bob Le Beau	Mid Mon Lady

2010-2001
2010
Fame And Glory	Recharge	Galileo's Choice
2009
Curtain Call	Famous Name	Moiqen
2008
Regime	Alarazi	Mores Wells
2007
Septimus	Fracas	Championship Point
2006
Alayan	Ace	Near Dock
2005
Cairdeas	Yeats	Wolfe Tone
2004
Nysaean	Latino Magic	Akshar
2003
Nysaean	Mkuzi	Miss Honorine
2002
Rebelline	Shoal Creek	Villa Carlotta
2001
Muakaad	Bach	Molomo

2000-1991
2000
Urban Ocean	Quws	Wray
1999
Campo Catino	Twickenham	Golden Rule
1998
Stage Affair	Fort Morgan	Code Of Honour
1997
Dance Design	Raiyoun	Tout A Coup
1996
Definite Article	Al Mohaajir	I'm Supposin
1995
Dancing Sunset	Ozette	Double On
1994
Cheviot Amble	Hushang	Wandering Thoughts
1993
Salmon Eile	Irish Memory	Yukon Gold
1992
Dowland	Approach The Bench	Thornberry
1991
Topanoora	Victorious Deed	Splash Of Colour

1990-1988
1990
Kostroma	Sadie Jordan	Peace Mission
1989
Executive Perk	Pylon Sparks	Elementary
1988
Hazy Bird	Fair Judgment	Hawaiian Peace

The Mooresbridge Stakes is a Group 2 flat horse race in Ireland open to thoroughbreds aged four years or older. It is run over a distance of 1 mile and 2 furlongs (2,012 metres) at the Curragh in early May.

== History ==
The event is named after Mooresbridge (or "Moore's Bridge"), a bridge close to the racecourse on the Curragh plain.

For a period the race held Listed status. It was promoted to Group 3 level in 2003 and upgraded to Group 2 status in 2017.

The Mooresbridge Stakes is currently sponsored by Coolmore Stud. Its sponsored title includes the name of City of Troy, a Coolmore stallion.

== Records ==
Most successful horse since 1986 (2 wins):

- Nysaean – 2003, 2004

Leading jockey since 1986 (7 wins):

- Ryan Moore - Found (2016), Minding (2017), Cliffs of Moher (2018), Magical (2019), Broome (2021), Los Angeles (2025), Minnie Hauk (2026)

Leading trainer since 1986 (15 wins):

- Aidan O'Brien – Dancing Sunset (1995), Urban Ocean (2000), Septimus (2007), Fame and Glory (2010), So You Think (2011), Windsor Palace (2012), Camelot (2013), Magician (2014), Found (2016), Minding (2017), Cliffs of Moher (2018), Magical (2019), Broome (2021), Los Angeles (2025), Minnie Hauk (2026)

== Winners since 1986 ==
Year	Winner	Age	Jockey	Trainer	Time
1986	Rising	4	Gabriel Curran	Kevin Prendergast	2:17.80
1987	Nashamaa	4	Christy Roche	Jim Bolger	2:09.20
1988	Hazy Bird	5	Stephen Craine	Paddy Mullins	2:16.30
1989	Executive Perk	4	Michael Kinane	Dermot Weld	2:17.30
1990	Kostroma	4	Stephen Craine	Tommy Stack	2:09.50
1991	Topanoora	4	Christy Roche	Jim Bolger	2:11.00
1992	Dowland	4	Warren O'Connor	Michael Kauntze	2:21.00
1993	Salmon Eile	5	Johnny Murtagh	Pat Flynn	2:18.00
1994	Cheviot Amble	6	John Egan	Pat Flynn	2:26.80
1995	Dancing Sunset	4	Christy Roche	Aidan O'Brien	2:10.10
1996	Definite Article	4	Michael Kinane	Dermot Weld	2:13.30
1997	Dance Design	4	Pat Shanahan	Dermot Weld	2:05.70
1998	Stage Affair	4	Pat Smullen	Dermot Weld	2:20.00
1999	Campo Catino	4	Johnny Murtagh	Charles O'Brien	2:23.20
2000	Urban Ocean	4	Michael Kinane	Aidan O'Brien	2:19.70
2001	Muakaad	4	Pat Smullen	Dermot Weld	2:09.00
2002	Rebelline	4	Declan McDonogh	Kevin Prendergast	2:14.60
2003	Nysaean	4	Richard Hughes	Richard Hannon Sr.	2:06.60
2004	Nysaean	5	Michael Kinane	Richard Hannon Sr.	2:09.30
2005	Cairdeas	4	Pat Smullen	Dermot Weld	2:13.60
2006	Alayan	4	Michael Kinane	John Oxx	2:13.00
2007	Septimus	4	Seamie Heffernan	Aidan O'Brien	2:10.70
2008	Regime	4	Pat Smullen	Michael Bell	2:17.46
2009	Curtain Call	4	Fran Berry	Luca Cumani	2:24.79
2010	Fame and Glory	4	Johnny Murtagh	Aidan O'Brien	2:13.92
2011	So You Think	5	Seamie Heffernan	Aidan O'Brien	2:12.83
2012	Windsor Palace	7	Colm O'Donoghue	Aidan O'Brien	2:19.41
2013	Camelot	4	Joseph O'Brien	Aidan O'Brien	2:16.27
2014	Magician	4	Joseph O'Brien	Aidan O'Brien	2:08.91
2015	Fascinating Rock	4	Pat Smullen	Dermot Weld	2:18.42
2016	Found	4	Ryan Moore	Aidan O'Brien	2:11.17
2017	Minding (Note: The 2017 and 2018 races took place at Naas due to redevelopment work at The Curragh.)	4	Ryan Moore	Aidan O'Brien	2:12.80
2018	Cliffs of Moher	4	Ryan Moore	Aidan O'Brien	2:12.54
2019	Magical	4	Ryan Moore	Aidan O'Brien	2:12.19
2020	Leo De Fury (Note: The 2020 race was run over 1m 2½f in June due to the COVID-19 pandemic in the Republic of Ireland)	4	Shane Foley	Jessica Harrington	2:14.01
2021	Broome	5	Ryan Moore	Aidan O'Brien	2:10.85
2022	Layfayette	5	Chris Hayes	Noel Meade	2:12.89
2023	Visualisation	5	Declan McDonogh	Joseph O'Brien	2:18.95
2024	White Birch	5	Colin Keane	John Murphy	2:21.10
2025	Los Angeles	4	Ryan Moore	Aidan O'Brien	2:05.27
2026	Minnie Hauk	4	Ryan Moore	Aidan O'Brien	2:06.50

== See also ==
- Horse racing in Ireland
- List of Irish flat horse races
