= Power (horse) =

British-bred Thoroughbred racehorse

- Racing colours of Michael Tabor
- Sire: Oasis Dream
- Grandsire: Green Desert
- Dam: Frappe
- Damsire: Inchinor
- Sex: Stallion
- Foaled: 6 March 2009
- Country: United Kingdom
- Colour: Bay
- Breeder: Norelands & Hugo Lascelles
- Owner: Derrick Smith, Mrs John Magnier, Michael Tabor
- Trainer: Aidan O'Brien
- Record: 9: 5-2-0
- Earnings: £429,539

Major wins
- Coventry Stakes (2011); National Stakes (2011); Irish 2000 Guineas (2012)

Power is a British-bred, Irish-trained retired Thoroughbred racehorse and current stallion. He won the Coventry Stakes and the National Stakes as a two-year-old in 2011. In May 2012 he won the Irish 2000 Guineas.

== Background ==
Power is a "big, powerful" bay horse with a white star. He was sired by the European Champion Sprinter Oasis Dream out of the mare Frappe. Frappe also produced the Ribblesdale Stakes winner Thakafaat and was a half sister of the 2000 Guineas winner Footstepsinthesand. Power was acquired by the Coolmore organisation and sent into training with Aidan O'Brien at Ballydoyle.

== Racing career ==
=== 2011: two-year-old season ===
Power began his racing career by winning a six furlong maiden race at the Curragh in early May and then won the Listed Marble Hill Stakes at the same venue three weeks later. In the latter race, he got the better of Tough As Nails to win by a short head.

In June Power was sent to England to contest the Coventry Stakes at Royal Ascot for which he started the 4/1 favourite in a field of twenty-three runners. Ridden by Ryan Moore, he was towards the back of the field before making progress to take the lead inside the final furlong to win by a neck from Roman Soldier. In August, Power returned to Ireland and started 7/4 favourite for the Group One Phoenix Stakes at the Curragh. He took the lead two furlongs from the finish but was overtaken in the last fifty yards by the filly La Collina who produced a "devastating turn of foot" to win by a neck.

A month later, Power started second favourite for the National Stakes over seven furlongs. Ridden by Seamie Heffernan, he tracked the leaders before taking the lead inside the final furlong and held the late challenge of the favourite Dragon Pulse to win by half a length. After the race, Heffernan called him a tough, strong and genuine colt. On his final appearance of the season, Power started 15/8 favourite for the Dewhurst Stakes at Newmarket. He "kept on well" in the last furlong to finish second, beaten half a length by his fellow Irish challenger Parish Hall.

=== 2012: three-year-old season ===
On his first appearance of 2012, Power was sent to Newmarket for the 2000 Guineas in which he started second favourite behind his stable companion Camelot. He made no impact in the race and was eased in the closing stages to finish seventeenth of the eighteen runners behind Camelot. Three weeks after his run at Newmarket, Power started at odds of 5/1 in the Irish 2000 Guineas. He took the lead inside the final furlong to win by a length from Foxtrot Romeo. He was ridden in the race by his trainer's son Joseph O'Brien, who described Power as "a classy horse" with "plenty of speed". Aidan O'Brien was so delighted by the result that he was unaware until told by journalists that his other runners had finished third and fourth.

On 19 June, Power started favourite for the St. James's Palace Stakes at Royal Ascot, but was never in contention in a rough race and finished unplaced behind Most Improved. Power sustained an injury in the Ascot race from which he never fully recovered. In October it was announced that he would be retired to the Coolmore Stud.

== Stud career ==
After standing for five seasons at Coolmore Stud in Ireland, Power was sold to Cambridge Stud in New Zealand where he was the leading first-season sire during the 2016-17 season. In 2019, he was relocated to Oaklands Stud in Queensland, Australia.

=== Notable progeny ===
Power has sired three Group 1 winners:

c = colt, f = filly, g = gelding

Foaled	Name	Sex	Major Wins
2017	Helvic Dream	g	Tattersalls Gold Cup
2017	Sonnyboyliston	g	Irish St Leger
2018	Laws of Indices	c	Prix Jean Prat

== Pedigree ==
Pedigree of Power (GB), bay stallion, 2009
Sire Oasis Dream 2000	Green Desert; 1983	Danzig	Northern Dancer
Sire Oasis Dream 2000	Green Desert; 1983	Danzig	Pas de Nom
Sire Oasis Dream 2000	Green Desert; 1983	Foreign Courier	Sir Ivor
Sire Oasis Dream 2000	Green Desert; 1983	Foreign Courier	Courtly Dee
Sire Oasis Dream 2000	Hope; 1991	Dancing Brave	Lyphard
Sire Oasis Dream 2000	Hope; 1991	Dancing Brave	Navajo Princess
Sire Oasis Dream 2000	Hope; 1991	Bahamian	Mill Reef
Sire Oasis Dream 2000	Hope; 1991	Bahamian	Sorbus
Dam Frappe 1996	Inchinor; 1990	Ahonoora	Lorenzaccio
Dam Frappe 1996	Inchinor; 1990	Ahonoora	Helen Nichols
Dam Frappe 1996	Inchinor; 1990	Inchmurrin	Lomond
Dam Frappe 1996	Inchinor; 1990	Inchmurrin	On Show
Dam Frappe 1996	Glatisant; 1991	Rainbow Quest	Blushing Groom
Dam Frappe 1996	Glatisant; 1991	Rainbow Quest	I Will Follow
Dam Frappe 1996	Glatisant; 1991	Dancing Rocks	Green Dancer
Dam Frappe 1996	Glatisant; 1991	Dancing Rocks	Croda Rossa (Family: 1-e)
