= Manfred Ostermann =

German politician (born 1958)

Manfred Ostermann (born 1958) is a German local politician and an independent. In 2007 he was elected as the chief executive (Landrat) of the district of Soltau-Fallingbostel for an initial term of 8 years.

== Life ==
Ostermann was born on 30 April 1958 in Detmold, North Rhine-Westphalia. After passing his A levels (Abitur) in the town of his birth and completing his basic conscription, Ostermann passed his studies in law in Passau and Göttingen. Ostermann was employed from 1990 to 2001 as an administrative lawyer (Verwaltungsjurist) in the district of Güstrow in Mecklenburg-Vorpommern and from 1994 also as deputy Landrat. In 2002 he became the First District Councillor (Erster Kreisrat) and General Representative (Allgemeiner Vertreter) of the district council for Soltau-Fallingbostel district (now Heidekreis district). After the death of the Landrat, Hermann Söder, in 2006, Ostermann took over the post, initially in an acting capacity, and subsequently ran for the office, supported by the newly formed alliance of Kompetenz für SFA, that was composed of representatives of the SPD, Alliance 90/The Greens, the Citizens' Union (Bürgerunion) and the Walsrode Citizens List (Walsroder Bürgerliste). In the elections on 14 January 2007 he won through with 52.8 % of the vote against his rivals, Karl-Ludwig von Danwitz (CDU) and Knut Maass (FDP).

== Private life ==
Ostermann is married with four children.
