= Belmont Gold Cup Stakes =

- Class: Grade II
- Location: Belmont Park; Elmont, New York, United States
- Inaugurated: 2014 (as Belmont Gold Cup Invitational Stakes)
- Race type: Thoroughbred - Flat racing - Widener Turf
- Website: nyra.com

Race information
- Distance: 2 miles
- Surface: Turf
- Track: Left-handed
- Qualification: Four years old and older
- Weight: 124 lbs with allowances
- Purse: $250,000 (2023)
- Bonuses: Automatic entry to Melbourne Cup

The Belmont Gold Cup Stakes is a Grade II American Thoroughbred horse race for horses aged four years old and older held over two miles on the turf scheduled annually in early June at Belmont Park in Elmont, New York. The event currently carries a purse of $250,000.

== History ==
The race was inaugurated in 2014 with a stakes purse of $200,000.

In 2017 the event was classified as Grade III and was reclassified as Grade II for 2018.

The event is longest graded event in North America and attracts many entrants from Europe where long distance staying races on the turf are more numerous.

In 2020 due to the COVID-19 pandemic in the United States, NYRA did not schedule the event in their updated and shortened spring-summer meeting.

In 2024 the event was moved to Saratoga Racetrack as part of the Belmont Stakes carnival due to infield tunnel and redevelopment work at Belmont Park.. The Irish-bred winner The Grey Wizard set a new track record for the two-mile journey.

The 2025 Edition was moved the to dirt course due to weather and downgraded to Grade III due to the condition of the turf course after heavy rain. The event was held over the one and three-quarter miles distance.

== Records ==
Speed record:

- 3:16.68 - Loft (GER) (2022)

Largest margin of victory:

- 8 1/2 lengths - Parchment Party (2025)

Most wins by a jockey:

- 4 – John R. Velazquez (2014, 2021, 2024, 2025)

Most wins by a trainer:

- No trainer has won this race more than once.

Most wins by an owner:

- No owner has won this race more than once.

== Winners ==
Year	Winner	Age	Jockey	Trainer	Owner	Distance	Time	Purse	Grade	Ref
At Saratoga – Belmont Gold Cup Stakes
2026	Tawny Port	7	Flavien Prat	Miguel Clement	Peachtree Stable	2 miles	3:17.75 (Note: Tawny Port set a new course record for 2 miles on the Saratoga Inner Turf Course)	$250,000	II	
2025	Parchment Party	4	John R. Velazquez	William Mott	Pin Oak Stud LLC	1 3/4 miles	2:57.86	$250,000	III	Off turf
2024	The Grey Wizard (IRE)	5	John R. Velazquez	H. Graham Motion	Eclipse Thoroughbred Partners and The Estate of Albert Frassetto	2 miles	3:18.35	$250,000	II	
At Belmont Park
2023	Siskany (GB)	5	William Buick	Charles Appleby	Godolphin	2 miles	3:23.94	$250,000	II	
2022	Loft (GER)	4	Andrasch Starke	Marcel Weiss	Manfred Ostermann	2 miles	3:16.68	$400,000	II	
2021	Baron Samedi (GB)	4	John R. Velazquez	Joseph O'Brien	LECH Racing	2 miles	3:27.30	$400,000	II	
2020	Race not held									
Belmont Gold Cup Invitational Stakes
2019	Amade (IRE)	5	Flavien Prat	Alessandro Botti	OTI Racing, Laurent Dassault & Elisa Berte	2 miles	3:19.95	$400,000	II	
2018	Call To Mind (GB)	4	Javier Castellano	William Haggas	Queen Elizabeth II	2 miles	3:16.78	$400,000	II	
2017	Red Cardinal (IRE)	5	Eduardo Pedroza	Andreas Wohler	Australian Bloodstock	2 miles	3:18.79	$400,000	III	
2016	Da Big Hoss	5	Florent Geroux	Michael J. Maker	Phillips Racing Partnership	2 miles	3:17.29	$300,000	Listed	
2015	Innovation Economy	4	Irad Ortiz Jr.	Chad C. Brown	Klaravich Stables & William H. Lawrence	2 miles	3:22.17	$250,000	Listed	
2014	Charming Kitten	4	John R. Velazquez	Todd A. Pletcher	Kenneth and Sarah Ramsey	2 miles	3:21.52	$200,000		

Legend:
Dirt Turf

== See also ==
- List of American and Canadian Graded races
