= Goldream =

British Thoroughbred racehorse

Goldream (foaled 19 April 2009) is a British racehorse trained by Robert Cowell and formerly trained by Luca Cumani. He's won two Group one races, the King's Stand Stakes and the Prix de l'Abbaye de Longchamp, as well as the group 3 Palace House Stakes. He won all of these in 2015.
