= Devoy Stakes =

Flat horse race in Ireland

Devoy Stakes
2026
Beset	Lemsairbat	Sunchart

Previous years
2025
Sunchart	Enfranchise	Trustyourinstinct
2024
Sunchart	Knight To King	Queenstown
2023
Visualisation	Sunchart	Self Belief
2022
Layfayette	Licence	Bear Story
2021
Broome	Sunchart	Sonnyboyliston

2020-2019
2020
Numerian	Sir Dragonet	Halimi
2019
Still Standing	Hazel Bay	Amedeo Modigliani

The Devoy Stakes is a Listed flat horse race in Ireland open to thoroughbreds aged four years and older. It is run at Naas over a distance of 1 mile and 2 furlongs (2,012 metres), and it is scheduled to take place each year in March.

The race was created as a new Listed race in 2019.

== Records ==
Most successful horse (2 wins):

- Sunchart - (2024, 2025)

Leading jockey (3 wins):

- Declan McDonogh – Numerian (2020), Visualisation (2023), Beset (2026)

Leading trainer (3 wins):

- Joseph O'Brien – Numerian (2020), Visualisation (2023), Beset (2026)

== Winners ==
Year	Winner	Age	Jockey	Trainer	Time
2019	Still Standing	4	Shane Foley	Jessica Harrington	2:25.76
2020	Numerian	4	Declan McDonogh	Joseph O'Brien	2:23.06
2021	Broome	4	Seamie Heffernan	Aidan O'Brien	2:18.75
2022	Layfayette	5	Oisin Orr	Noel Meade	2:09.64
2023	Visualisation	5	Declan McDonogh	Joseph O'Brien	2:29.16
2024	Sunchart	7	Andrew Slattery	Andrew Slattery	2:31.36
2025	Sunchart	8	Andrew Slattery	Andrew Slattery	2:29.39
2026	Beset	5	Declan McDonogh	Joseph O'Brien	2:31.22

== See also ==
- Horse racing in Ireland
- List of Irish flat horse races
