= International Stakes (Ireland) =

Flat horse race in Ireland

- Class: Group 3
- Location: Curragh Racecourse; County Kildare, Ireland
- Race type: Flat / Thoroughbred
- Sponsor: Novi IT services
- Website: Curragh

Race information
- Distance: 1m 2f (2,012 metres)
- Surface: Turf
- Track: Right-handed
- Qualification: Three-years-old and up
- Weight: 8 st 12 lb (3yo); 9 st 8 lb (4yo+); Allowances; 3 lb for fillies and mares Penalties; 5 lb for G1 / G2 winners * 3 lb for G3 winners * * since 1 August last year
- Purse: €94,000 (2022); 1st: €59,000

International Stakes
2026
Purview	Trustyourinstinct	Hotazhell

Previous years
2025
Trustyourinstinct	Layfayette	Deepone
2024
Jan Brueghel	Trustyourinstinct	Ecureuil Secret
2023
Mashhoor	Al Riffa	Alfred Munnings
2022
Aikhal	Duke De Sessa	Rumbles Of Thunder
2021
Cadillac	Dawn Patrol	True Self

2020-2011
2020
Helvic Dream	Up Helly Aa	Raise You
2019
Buckhurst	Blenheim Palace	Georgeville
2018
Yucatan	Stellar Mass	Reckless Gold
2017
Johannes Vermeer	Success Days	Moonlight Magic
2016
Sir Isaac Newton	Chemical Charge	In My Pocket
2015
Air Pilot	Parish Hall	Roheryn
2014
Mekong River	Parish Hall	Ebanoran
2013
Flying The Flag	Aloof	Most Improved
2012
Famous Name	Defining Year	Native Khan
2011
Famous Name	Jan Vermeer	Mid Mon Lady

2010-2001
2010
Precious Gem	Shintoh	Grand Admiral
2009
Famous Name	Staying On	Red Rock Canyon
2008
Plan	Regime	Mustameet
2007
Decado	Cougar Bay	Danehill Music
2006
Mustameet	Ace	Modeeroch
2005
Moonlight Dance	Lock And Key	Democratic Deficit
2004
Red Feather	Trefflich	Wathab
2003
Sea Dart	Al Turf	France
2002
Century City	Common World	Wrong Key
2001
Distant Music	Muakaad	Bonnard

2000-1991
2000
Alrassaam	Jammaal	Sarafan
1999
Great Dane	Altibr	Access All Areas
1998
Burden Of Proof	Impressionist	Cambodian
1997
Alhaarth	Gothenberg	Polar Prince
1996
Gothenberg	Timarida	Tamayaz
1995
Darnay	Dance Turn	Off'N'Away
1994
Alflora	Maroof	Emperor Jones
1993
Ivory Frontier	Alflora	Master Tribe
1992
Sikeston	Sure Sharp	Rami
1991
Mukaddamah	Prudent Manner	Street Rebel

1990-1988
1990
Zoman	Distant Relative	Wedding Bouquet
1989
Distant Relative	Sagamore	Executive Perk
1988
Caerwent	Just A Flutter	Noora Abu

The International Stakes is a Group 3 flat horse race in Ireland open to thoroughbreds aged three years or older. It is run at the Curragh over a distance of 1 mile and 2 furlongs (2,012 metres), and it is scheduled to take place each year in late June or early July.

== History ==
The event was originally held at Phoenix Park, and it was formerly known as the Whitehall Stakes. It was initially contested over 1 mile and 1 furlong, and for a period it was classed at Group 2 level. It was cut to 1 mile in 1986, and it was transferred to the Curragh in 1991.

The distance was extended by a furlong in 1999, and it reverted to its previous length in 2002. The race was restricted to three-year-olds in 2003, and it was downgraded to Group 3 status the following year. It was re-opened to older horses in 2006, and the race returned to 1 mile and 1 furlong in 2007. It was increased to 1 mile and 2 furlongs in 2010.

The International Stakes is currently held on the final day of the Curragh's three-day Irish Derby meeting.

== Records ==
Most successful horse since 1950 (3 wins):

- Famous Name – 2009, 2011, 2012

Leading jockey since 1950 (6 wins):

- George McGrath – Ballyciptic (1965), Bluerullah (1966), Signa Infesta (1967), Lovely Kate (1970), Bog Road (1973, dead-heat), Furry Glen (1974)

Leading trainer since 1950 (11 wins):

- Vincent O'Brien – El Toro (1959), Onondaga (1969), Grenfall (1971), Nantequos (1976), Stradavinsky (1978), Muscovite (1980), Magesterial (1981), Punctilio (1982), Salmon Leap (1983), Fair Judgment (1987), Caerwent (1988)

== Winners since 1980 ==
Year	Winner	Age	Jockey	Trainer	Time
1980	Muscovite	3	Tommy Murphy	Vincent O'Brien
1981	Magesterial	4	Pat Eddery	Vincent O'Brien
1982	Punctilio	3	Pat Eddery	Vincent O'Brien
1983	Salmon Leap	3	Pat Eddery	Vincent O'Brien
1984	Teleprompter	4	Brian Rouse	Bill Watts
1985	Teleprompter	5	Tony Ives	Bill Watts
1986	Sarab	5	Pat Eddery	Paul Cole
1987	Fair Judgment	3	Cash Asmussen	Vincent O'Brien
1988	Caerwent	3	John Reid	Vincent O'Brien	1:38.27
1989	Distant Relative	3	Michael Hills	Barry Hills	1:36.60
1990	Zoman	3	Richard Quinn	Paul Cole	1:39.70
1991	Mukaddamah	3	Willie Carson	Peter Walwyn	1:37.30
1992	Sikeston	6	Michael Roberts	Clive Brittain	1:37.00
1993	Ivory Frontier (Note: Alflora finished first in 1993, but he was relegated to second place following a stewards' inquiry)	3	Christy Roche	Jim Bolger	1:39.00
1994	Alflora	5	Michael Roberts	Clive Brittain	1:38.50
1995	Darnay	4	Frankie Dettori	Saeed bin Suroor	1:36.40
1996	Gothenberg	3	Jason Weaver	Mark Johnston	1:34.80
1997	Alhaarth	4	Frankie Dettori	Saeed bin Suroor	1:39.00
1998	Burden of Proof	6	Johnny Murtagh	Charles O'Brien	1:44.00
1999	Great Dane	4	Kieren Fallon	Sir Henry Cecil	1:52.20
2000	Alrassaam	4	Philip Robinson	Michael Jarvis	1:52.90
2001	Distant Music	4	Richard Hughes	Barry Hills	1:53.10
2002	Century City	3	Michael Kinane	Aidan O'Brien	1:46.00
2003	Sea Dart	3	Johnny Murtagh	John Oxx	1:39.80
2004	Red Feather	3	Niall McCullagh	Edward Lynam	1:41.00
2005	Moonlight Dance	3	Pat Smullen	Dermot Weld	1:38.40
2006	Mustameet	5	Declan McDonogh	Kevin Prendergast	1:39.30
2007	Decado	4	Declan McDonogh	Kevin Prendergast	2:01.25
2008	Plan	3	Johnny Murtagh	Aidan O'Brien	1:56.86
2009	Famous Name	4	Pat Smullen	Dermot Weld	1:57.43
2010	Precious Gem	4	Pat Smullen	Dermot Weld	2:05.94
2011	Famous Name	6	Pat Smullen	Dermot Weld	2:15.41
2012	Famous Name	7	Pat Smullen	Dermot Weld	2:14.49
2013	Flying the Flag	3	Seamie Heffernan	Aidan O'Brien	2:04.09
2014	Mekong River	3	Seamie Heffernan	Aidan O'Brien	2:06.30
2015	Air Pilot	6	Ryan Moore	Ralph Beckett	2:22.14
2016	Sir Isaac Newton	4	Ryan Moore	Aidan O'Brien	2:12.25
2017	Johannes Vermeer	4	Ryan Moore	Aidan O'Brien	2:10.30
2018	Yucatán	4	Ryan Moore	Aidan O'Brien	2:09.12
2019	Buckhurst	3	Wayne Lordan	Joseph O'Brien	2:07.74
2020	Helvic Dream (Note: The 2020 race was run in October due to the COVID-19 pandemic in the Republic of Ireland)	3	Colin Keane	Noel Meade	2:15.85
2021	Cadillac	3	Shane Foley	Jessica Harrington	2:08.88
2022	Aikhal	3	Ryan Moore	Aidan O'Brien	2:08.15
2023	Mashhoor	5	Ben Coen	Johnny Murtagh	2:07.11
2024	Jan Brueghel	3	Ryan Moore	Aidan O'Brien	2:09.86
2025	Trustyourinstinct	5	Dylan Browne McMonagle	Joseph O'Brien	2:04.04
2026	Purview	4	Colin Keane	Dermot Weld	2:03.28

== Earlier winners ==
- 1950: Eastern City
- 1951: Evian
- 1952: Solar
- 1953: Prince of Fairfield
- 1954: Coral Slipper
- 1955: Tara
- 1956: Beau Chevalet
- 1957: Owenello
- 1958: Jack Ketch
- 1959: El Toro
- 1960: Dante's Hope
- 1961: Bally Vimy
- 1962: Gay Challenger
- 1963: Linacre
- 1964: Deep Lavender
- 1965: Ballyciptic
- 1966: Bluerullah
- 1967: Signa Infesta
- 1968: Warren
- 1969: Onondaga
- 1970: Lovely Kate
- 1971: Grenfall
- 1972: Bunkered
- 1973: Barclay Joy / Bog Road *
- 1974: Furry Glen
- 1975: Hurry Harriet
- 1976: Nantequos
- 1977: Aristocracy
- 1978: Stradavinsky
- 1979: Orchestra

* The 1973 race was a dead-heat and has joint winners.

== See also ==
- Horse racing in Ireland
- List of Irish flat horse races
