= Tattersalls Gold Cup =

Flat horse race in Ireland

- Class: Group 1
- Location: Curragh Racecourse; County Kildare, Ireland
- Inaugurated: 1962
- Race type: Flat / Thoroughbred
- Sponsor: Tattersalls
- Website: Curragh

Race information
- Distance: 1m 2½f (2,112 metres)
- Surface: Turf
- Track: Right-handed
- Qualification: Four-years-old and up
- Weight: 9 st 5 lb Allowances; 3 lb for fillies and mares
- Purse: €470,000 (2024); 1st: €295,000

Tattersalls Gold Cup
2026
Almaqam	Bay City Roller	Saddadd

Previous years
2025
Los Angeles	Anmaat	Kalpana
2024
White Birch	Auguste Rodin	Crypto Force
2023
Luxembourg	Bay Bridge	Piz Badile
2022
Alenquer	High Definition	State Of Rest
2021
Helvic Dream	Broome	True Self

2020-2011
2020
Magical	Sir Dragonet	Search For A Song
2019
Magical	Flag Of Honour	Mustajeer
2018
Lancaster Bomber	Cliffs Of Moher	Defoe
2017
Decorated Knight	Somehow	Deauville
2016
Fascinating Rock	Found	Success Days
2015
Al Kazeem	Fascinating Rock	Postponed
2014
Noble Mission	Magician	Euphrasia
2013
Al Kazeem	Camelot	Windsor Palace
2012
So You Think	Famous Name	Robin Hood
2011
So You Think	Campanologist	Famous Name

2010-2001
2010
Fame And Glory	Recharge	Chinese White
2009
Casual Conquest	Famous Name	Lush Lashes
2008
Duke Of Marmalade	Finsceal Beo	Red Rock Canyon
2007
Notnowcato	Dylan Thomas	Youmzain
2006
Hurricane Run	Alexander Goldrun	Lord Admiral
2005
Grey Swallow	Bago	Ace
2004
Powerscourt	Livadiya	Nysaean
2003
Black Sam Bellamy	Highdown	Narrative
2002
Rebelline	Bach	Nayef
2001
Fantastic Light	Golden Snake	Kalanisi

2000-1991
2000
Montjeu	Greek Dance	Mutafaweq
1999
Shiva	Daylami	Make No Mistake
1998
Daylami	Stage Affair	Quws
1997
Dance Design	Oscar Schindler	Taipan
1996
Definite Article	Timarida	Annus Mirabilis
1995
Prince Of Andros	Just Happy	Environment Friend
1994
Perfect Imposter	George Augustus	Ezzoud
1993
George Augustus	Ezzoud	Approach The Bench
1992
Opera House	Zoman	Star Of Gdansk
1991
Zoman	Topanoora	Panoramic

1990-1988
1990
Batshoof	Pirate Army	Glowing Star
1989
Ile De Chypre	Executive Perk	Carroll House
1988
Shady Heights	Fair Judgment	Hazy Bird

The Tattersalls Gold Cup is a Group 1 flat horse race in Ireland open to thoroughbreds aged four years or older. It is run at the Curragh over a distance of 1 mile, 2 furlongs and 110 yards (2,112 metres), and it is scheduled to take place each year in May.

== History ==
The event was established in 1962, and it was originally called the Ballymoss Stakes. It was named in honour of Ballymoss, a successful Irish-trained racehorse in the late 1950s. The first two runnings were held at Limerick Junction over 1 mile and 3½ furlongs (1962) and 1 mile and 4 furlongs (1963). During the early part of its history it was open to horses aged three or older.

The race was renamed the Rogers Gold Cup in 1984, and the minimum age was raised to four in 1985. Under the sponsorship of Tattersalls it became known as the Tattersalls Rogers Gold Cup, and this was shortened to the present title in 1993. For a period the event held Group 2 status, and it was promoted to Group 1 level in 1999.

== Records ==
Most successful horse (2 wins):

- Yankee Gold – 1976, 1977
- So You Think - 2011, 2012
- Al Kazeem - 2013, 2015
- Magical - 2019, 2020

Leading jockey (6 wins):

- Michael Kinane – Cockney Lass (1987), Prince of Andros (1995), Definite Article (1996), Dance Design (1997), Montjeu (2000), Black Sam Bellamy (2003)

Leading trainer (11 wins):

- Aidan O'Brien – Black Sam Bellamy (2003), Powerscourt (2004), Duke of Marmalade (2008), Fame and Glory (2010), So You Think (2011, 2012), Lancaster Bomber (2018), Magical (2019, 2020),Luxembourg (2023), Los Angeles (2025)

Leading owner since 1980 (12 wins): (includes part ownership)

- Michael Tabor – Montjeu (2000), Black Sam Bellamy (2003), Hurricane Run (2006), Duke of Marmalade (2008), Fame and Glory (2010), So You Think (2011, 2012), Lancaster Bomber (2018), Magical (2019, 2020),Luxembourg (2023), Los Angeles (2025)

== Winners since 1980 ==
Year	Winner	Age	Jockey	Trainer	Owner	Time
1980	Noelino	4	Christy Roche	Paddy Prendergast	Roderic More O'Ferrall	2:12.90
1981	Erins Isle	3	Declan Gillespie	Jim Bolger	H. McCaffrey	2:17.60
1982	Golden Fleece	3	Pat Eddery	Vincent O'Brien	Robert Sangster	2:12.30
1983	Evening M'Lord	3	Stephen Craine	P. Prendergast, Jr.	S. Threadwell	2:20.90
1984	Foscarini	3	Pat Shanahan	Con Collins	Charles St George	2:06.80
1985	Elegant Air	4	Lester Piggott	Ian Balding	Paul Mellon
1986	Fair of the Furze	4	Willie Carson	Liam Browne	Sonia Rogers
1987	Cockney Lass	4	Michael Kinane	Dermot Weld	Allen Paulson	2:03.70
1988	Shady Heights	4	Michael Roberts	Robert Armstrong	George Tong	2:08.60
1989	Ile de Chypre	4	Tony Clark	Guy Harwood	Athos Christodoulou	2:03.60
1990	Batshoof	4	Pat Eddery	Ben Hanbury	Muttar Salem	2:09.30
1991	Zoman	4	Alan Munro	Paul Cole	Prince Fahd bin Salman	2:07.20
1992	Opera House	4	Steve Cauthen	Michael Stoute	Sheikh Mohammed	2:06.40
1993	George Augustus	5	Michael Roberts	John Oxx	Sheikh Mohammed	2:11.50
1994	Perfect Imposter	4	Kevin Manning	Jim Bolger	Michael Smurfit	2:23.30
1995	Prince of Andros	5	Michael Kinane	David Loder	Lucayan Stud	2:04.80
1996	Definite Article	4	Michael Kinane	Dermot Weld	Moyglare Stud Farm	2:08.90
1997	Dance Design	4	Michael Kinane	Dermot Weld	Moyglare Stud Farm	2:05.60
1998	Daylami	4	Frankie Dettori	Saeed bin Suroor	Godolphin	2:06.30
1999	Shiva	4	Kieren Fallon	Henry Cecil	Niarchos Family	2:10.20
2000	Montjeu	4	Michael Kinane	John Hammond	Michael Tabor	2:13.30
2001	Fantastic Light	5	Frankie Dettori	Saeed bin Suroor	Godolphin	2:13.40
2002	Rebelline	4	Declan McDonogh	Kevin Prendergast	Lady O'Reilly	2:22.20
2003	Black Sam Bellamy	4	Michael Kinane	Aidan O'Brien	Michael Tabor	2:14.80
2004	Powerscourt	4	Jamie Spencer	Aidan O'Brien	Sue Magnier	2:11.00
2005	Grey Swallow	4	Pat Smullen	Dermot Weld	Murry Rose Bloodstock	2:15.10
2006	Hurricane Run	4	Kieren Fallon	André Fabre	Michael Tabor	2:26.40
2007	Notnowcato	5	Johnny Murtagh	Sir Michael Stoute	A. & D. de Rothschild	2:16.20
2008	Duke of Marmalade	4	Johnny Murtagh	Aidan O'Brien	Magnier / Tabor	2:15.77
2009	Casual Conquest	4	Pat Smullen	Dermot Weld	Moyglare Stud Farm	2:26.45
2010	Fame and Glory	4	Johnny Murtagh	Aidan O'Brien	Smith / Magnier / Tabor	2:13.57
2011	So You Think	5	Ryan Moore	Aidan O'Brien	Derrick Smith et al.	2:14.08
2012	So You Think	6	Joseph O'Brien	Aidan O'Brien	Derrick Smith et al.	2:15.60
2013	Al Kazeem	5	James Doyle	Roger Charlton	John Deer	2:14.48
2014	Noble Mission	5	James Doyle	Lady Cecil	Khalid Abdullah	2:21.71
2015	Al Kazeem	7	James Doyle	Roger Charlton	John Deer	2:13.37
2016	Fascinating Rock	5	Pat Smullen	Dermot Weld	Newton Anner Stud Farm	2:20.72
2017	Decorated Knight	5	Andrea Atzeni	Roger Charlton	Al Homaizi / Al Sagar	2:18.03
2018	Lancaster Bomber	4	Seamie Heffernan	Aidan O'Brien	Smith / Magnier / Tabor	2:14.05
2019	Magical	4	Ryan Moore	Aidan O'Brien	Smith / Magnier / Tabor	2:13.85
2020	Magical (Note: The 2020 race was run in July due to the COVID-19 pandemic in the Republic of Ireland)	5	Wayne Lordan	Aidan O'Brien	Smith / Magnier / Tabor	2:10.39
2021	Helvic Dream	4	Colin Keane	Noel Meade	Caroline Hendron & M Cahill	2:21.11
2022	Alenquer	4	Tom Marquand	William Haggas	M M Stables	2:11.44
2023	Luxembourg	4	Ryan Moore	Aidan O'Brien	Westerberg / Smith / Magnier / Tabor	2:13.62
2024	White Birch	4	Colin Keane	John Murphy	C. C. Regalado-Gonzalez	2:11.61
2025	Los Angeles	4	Ryan Moore	Aidan O'Brien	Westerberg/Tabor / Smith / Magnier	2:08.41
2026	Almaqam	5	Kieran Shoemark	Ed Walker	Sheikh Ahmed Al Maktoum	2:06.80

== Earlier winners ==
- 1962: T V
- 1963: Nardoo
- 1964: Glenrowan
- 1965: Hardicanute
- 1966: Radbrook
- 1967: White Gloves
- 1968: Candy Cane
- 1969: Selko
- 1970: Eucalyptus
- 1971: Rarity
- 1972: Assertive
- 1973: Cavo Doro
- 1974: Bog Road
- 1975: Hurry Harriet
- 1976: Yankee Gold
- 1977: Yankee Gold
- 1978: Exdirectory
- 1979: Dickens Hill

== See also ==
- List of Irish flat horse races
- Recurring sporting events established in 1962 – this race is included under its original title, Ballymoss Stakes.
