= Oasis Dream =

British-bred Thoroughbred racehorse

- Racing colours of Khalid Abdullah
- Sire: Green Desert
- Grandsire: Danzig
- Dam: Hope
- Damsire: Dancing Brave
- Sex: Stallion
- Foaled: 30 March 2000
- Country: United Kingdom
- Colour: Bay
- Breeder: Juddmonte Farms
- Owner: Khalid Abdullah
- Trainer: John Gosden
- Record: 9:4-2-1
- Earnings: £433,737

Major wins
- Middle Park Stakes (2002); July Cup (2003); Nunthorpe Stakes (2003)

Awards
- European Champion Sprinter (2003)

Oasis Dream (foaled 30 March 2000) is retired thoroughbred racehorse and sire who was bred and trained in the United Kingdom. He was the highest-rated two-year-old in the 2002 European flat racing season and won the Cartier Racing Award for European Champion Sprinter in 2003.

== Background ==
Oasis Dream, a bay horse with a white star standing 15.3 hands high, was bred by his owner's Juddmonte Farm stud. He was sired by Green Desert out of the Dancing Brave mare Hope.

Green Desert finished second to Dancing Brave in the 2000 Guineas and became a leading sprinter, winning the July Cup. Apart from Oasis Dream, he sired the winners of over 1,000 races, including Desert Prince, Sheikh Albadou and Cape Cross, the sire of Sea the Stars. Oasis Dream's dam, Hope, was a sister of the Irish Oaks winner Wemyss Bight and was also the dam of the Poule d'Essai des Pouliches winner Zenda.

He is inbred to the stallions Northern Dancer and Never Bend (see below).

Oasis Dream was trained throughout his career by John Gosden at Newmarket, Suffolk.

== Racing career ==
=== 2002: two-year-old season ===
Oasis Dream made his debut in a six furlong maiden race at Salisbury in August 2002. He started favourite but ran disappointingly, finishing a well beaten fifth of the eleven runners. Two weeks later in a similar event at Sandown he was the beaten favourite again, leading early but fading in the closing stages to finish second, beaten three and a half lengths by Rimrod.

Three weeks after his second defeat, Oasis Dream recorded his first win, "easily" beating four rivals in a maiden at Nottingham.

In October, Oasis Dream was moved up to the highest level for the Group One Middle Park Stakes at Newmarket. The field included the winners of several important races including Elusive City (Prix Morny), Zafeen (Mill Reef Stakes) and Country Reel (Gimcrack Stakes), as well as four runners from the Aidan O'Brien stable. Jimmy Fortune tracked the leaders on Oasis Dream, before moving the colt into the lead a furlong out, where he ran on strongly to win by one and a half lengths from Tomahawk and Elusive City. The winning time of 1:09.61 was a record for the race. After the race Gosden described him as being probably the fastest two-year-old in Europe and he was regarded as a serious contender for the 2000 Guineas.

=== 2003: three-year-old season ===
Oasis Dream's prospects of winning a Classic faded in the spring. The colt did not perform well at home, and Gosden decided not to force his progress, and instead wait until summer for a campaign based on the top sprint races. He was ridden in all his races in 2003 by Richard Hughes.

He did not appear until Royal Ascot where he was made 6/1 favourite in a field of twenty for the five-furlong King's Stand Stakes. He ran prominently but was unable to catch the Australian horse Choisir and lost second place in the closing stages to Acclamation. Four days later, Choisir won the Golden Jubilee Stakes.

At Newmarket a month later Oasis Dream was matched against Choisir for a second time in the July Cup, this time over six furlongs. Oasis Dream tracked Choisir in the early stages before catching the Australian a furlong out and running on to win a "protracted battle" by one and a half lengths. In the Nunthorpe Stakes at York in August Oasis Dream confirmed his position as the best British sprinter. On this occasion he led from the start and went clear of the opposition in the last quarter-mile to win by two and a half lengths in "impressive" style. Although he was eased up in the closing strides, his winning time was only four hundredths of a second outside the track record set by Dayjur. Gosden described him as the fastest horse he had trained and compared him to Abernant, while the Independent's correspondent called the contest "not a Group One race (but)...a homage."

Oasis Dream was made odds-on favourite for the Sprint Cup at Haydock in September, despite the fact that he was racing on ground that was softer and slower than anything he had previously encountered. He took the lead two furlongs from the finish, but was soon under pressure and in the final furlong he was overtaken and beaten one and a quarter lengths by Somnus. On his final start he was sent to California for the Breeders' Cup at Santa Anita Park after being a late withdrawal from the Prix de l'Abbaye de Longchamp. Despite not having run over a distance beyond six furlongs all season, he was entered in the Breeders' Cup Mile rather than the Sprint. Gosden had said after the Nunthorpe that Oasis Dream would be unsuited by the dirt surface in the Sprint and that the Mile was his likely end-of-season target. His price for the Mile drifted after he was given an unfavourable outside draw, making it likely that he would have to use much of his speed to reach the front in the early stages. In the race he did show some early pace but made no real impression, finishing tenth of the thirteen runners behind Six Perfections.

== Race record ==
| Date | Race | Dist (f) | Course | Class | Prize (£K) | Odds | Runners | Placing | Margin | Time | Jockey | Trainer |
|---|---|---|---|---|---|---|---|---|---|---|---|---|
| 14 August 2002 | Sandown EBF Maiden Stakes | 6 | Salisbury | M | 5 | 7/4 | 12 | 5 | 8.5 | 1:14.72 | Richard Hughes | John Gosden |
| 30 August 2002 | EBF Alliance Capital Maiden Stakes | 7 | Sandown | M | 5 | 7/4 | 11 | 2 | 3.5 | 1:30.04 | Jimmy Fortune | John Gosden |
| 20 September 2002 | EBF Colwick Park Maiden Stakes | 6 | Nottingham | M | 5 | 1/3 | 5 | 1 | 4 | 1:13.30 | Jimmy Fortune | John Gosden |
| 3 October 2002 | Middle Park Stakes | 6 | Newmarket Rowley | 1 | 100 | 6/1 | 10 | 1 | 1.5 | 1:09.61 | Jimmy Fortune | John Gosden |
| 17 June 2003 | King's Stand Stakes | 5 | Ascot | 2 | 81 | 6/1 | 20 | 3 | 2.5 | 0:59.68 | Richard Hughes | John Gosden |
| 10 July 2003 | July Cup | 6 | Newmarket July | 1 | 145 | 9/2 | 16 | 1 | 1.5 | 1:09.94 | Richard Hughes | John Gosden |
| 21 August 2003 | Nunthorpe Stakes | 5 | York | 1 | 116 | 4/9 | 8 | 1 | 2.5 | 0:56.20 | Richard Hughes | John Gosden |
| 6 September 2003 | Haydock Sprint Cup | 6 | Haydock | 1 | 130 | 8/11 | 10 | 2 | 1.25 | 1:13.49 | Richard Hughes | John Gosden |
| 25 October 2003 | Breeders' Cup Mile | 8 | Santa Anita | 1 | 487 | 13/2 | 13 | 10 | 7.75 | 1:33.86 | Richard Hughes | John Gosden |

== Assessment ==
In the 2002 International Classification, the forerunner of the World Thoroughbred Racehorse Rankings, Oasis Dream was assessed at 123, making him the highest rated two-year-old in Europe. There was controversy about his rating, as some felt that Hold That Tiger, Tout Seul and Somnus had stronger claims.

In the 2003 World Thoroughbred Racehorse Rankings Oasis Dream was rated 125 making him the eleventh best horse in the world, and the third best three-year-old colt.

== Stud career ==
Oasis Dream stood at the Banstead Manor Stud from 2004 to 2026 for his owner's Juddmonte Farms breeding organisation. He has sired over 180 stakes horses and the winners of over 210 stakes races, including 27 Group 1 races, with a stakes winners to runners percentage of 11%. His Group 1 winners include six-time Group 1 winner Midday, Champion Sprinter Muhaarar, Goldream, Prohibit, Aqlaam, Power and Jwala.

In 2018 he was the sire of two new Group 1 winners – Prix Maurice de Gheest winner Polydream and Prix Morny winner Pretty Pollyanna.

Oasis Dream was retired from stud duties in May 2026.

=== Notable progeny ===
c = colt, f = filly

| Foaled | Name | Sex | Major wins |
| 2005 | Aqlaam | c | Prix du Moulin de Longchamp |
| 2005 | Prohibit | c | King's Stand Stakes |
| 2005 | Tuscan Evening | f | Gamely Stakes |
| 2005 | Lady Jane Digby | f | Bayerisches Zuchtrennen |
| 2006 | Midday | f | Nassau Stakes (3 times), Breeders' Cup Filly & Mare Turf, Yorkshire Oaks, Prix Vermeille |
| 2006 | Naaqoos | c | Prix Jean-Luc Lagardère |
| 2006 | Querari | c | Premio Presidente della Repubblica |
| 2007 | Arcano | c | Prix Morny |
| 2009 | Jwala | f | Nunthorpe Stakes |
| 2009 | Muarrab | c | Dubai Golden Shaheen |
| 2009 | Opinion | c | The Metropolitan |
| 2009 | Power | c | National Stakes, Irish 2,000 Guineas |
| 2009 | Goldream | c | King's Stand Stakes, Prix de l'Abbaye de Longchamp |
| 2012 | Muhaarar | c | Commonwealth Cup, July Cup, Prix Maurice de Gheest, British Champions Sprint Stakes |
| 2012 | Charming Thought | c | Middle Park Stakes |
| 2015 | Polydream | f | Prix Maurice de Gheest |
| 2016 | Pretty Pollyanna | f | Prix Morny |
| 2019 | Native Trail | c | National Stakes, Dewhurst Stakes, Irish 2,000 Guineas |

== Pedigree ==
Pedigree of Oasis Dream (GB), bay stallion, 2000
| Sire Green Desert (USA) 1983 | Danzig; 1977 | Northern Dancer* | Nearctic |
| Sire Green Desert (USA) 1983 | Danzig; 1977 | Northern Dancer* | Natalma |
| Sire Green Desert (USA) 1983 | Danzig; 1977 | Pas de Nom | Admiral's Voyage |
| Sire Green Desert (USA) 1983 | Danzig; 1977 | Pas de Nom | Petitioner |
| Sire Green Desert (USA) 1983 | Foreign Courier; 1979 | Sir Ivor | Sir Gaylord |
| Sire Green Desert (USA) 1983 | Foreign Courier; 1979 | Sir Ivor | Attica |
| Sire Green Desert (USA) 1983 | Foreign Courier; 1979 | Courtly Dee | Never Bend* |
| Sire Green Desert (USA) 1983 | Foreign Courier; 1979 | Courtly Dee | Tulle |
| Dam Hope (IRE) 1991 | Dancing Brave; 1983 | Lyphard | Northern Dancer* |
| Dam Hope (IRE) 1991 | Dancing Brave; 1983 | Lyphard | Goofed |
| Dam Hope (IRE) 1991 | Dancing Brave; 1983 | Navajo Princess | Drone |
| Dam Hope (IRE) 1991 | Dancing Brave; 1983 | Navajo Princess | Olmec |
| Dam Hope (IRE) 1991 | Bahamian; 1985 | Mill Reef | Never Bend* |
| Dam Hope (IRE) 1991 | Bahamian; 1985 | Mill Reef | Milan Mill |
| Dam Hope (IRE) 1991 | Bahamian; 1985 | Sorbus | Busted |
| Dam Hope (IRE) 1991 | Bahamian; 1985 | Sorbus | Censorship (Family:19) |

- Oasis Dream is inbred 3 × 4 to Northern Dancer. This means that Northern Dancer appears in both the third and fourth generations of his pedigree.
- He is also inbred 4 × 4 to Never Bend.
