= Iroquois Steeplechase =

- Class: Grade I
- Location: Percy Warner Park; Nashville, Tennessee, United States
- Inaugurated: 1941
- Race type: Thoroughbred – Steeplechase
- Website: Iroquois Steeplechase

Race information
- Distance: 3 miles
- Surface: Turf
- Track: Steeplechase, national fences
- Qualification: Four-Year-Olds and Upward
- Weight: Four-year-olds, 142 lbs.; older, 158 lbs.
- Purse: $250,000

The Iroquois Steeplechase (also known as the Iroquois Hurdle Stakes) is an American Grade I NSA sanctioned steeplechase race run the second Saturday of May every year at Percy Warner Park in Nashville, Tennessee.

The race dates back to 1941 and has been held annually, except in 1945, due to World War II, and in 2020, due to the COVID-19 pandemic. The Iroquois itself is the culmination of a card of races which usually includes five to seven preliminary races, both flat races and steeplechases. The race is named for Iroquois, the first American-bred Thoroughbred to win the prestigious British Epsom Derby.

Several winners of the race have been named American Champion Steeplechase Horse, including Flatterer, Lonesome Glory, Snap Decision, Correggio, All Gong, Good Night Shirt, Pierrot Lunaire, Divine Fortune, Demonstrative, Rawnaq, and Scorpiancer.

The race is three miles (4.8 km) long, over national fences and for four-year-olds and over.

== Records since 1991 ==
Speed record:

- 5:29.40 – Victorian Hill (1991)

Most wins by a horse:

- 3 – Uncle Edwin (1982, 1985, 1986), 3 - Snap Decision (2021, 2022, 2024)

Most wins by a jockey:

- 4 – Blythe Miller (1991, 1992, 1995, 2002)

Most wins by a trainer:

- 8 – Jack Fisher (1996, 2007, 2008, 2017, 2019, 2021, 2022, 2024)

Most wins by an owner:

- 5 – Burton Street US (2017, 2019, 2021, 2022, 2024)
- 3 – Irvin S. Naylor (2010, 2011, 2016)
- 3 – William C. Lickle (1991, 1992, 1997)

== Winners ==
=== 1982–1990 ===
- 1982 Uncle Edwin
- 1983 Census
- 1984 Census
- 1985 Uncle Edwin
- 1986 Uncle Edwin
- 1987 Flatterer
- 1988 Steve Canyon
- 1989 Kesslin
- 1990 Pacific Spy

=== 1991–present ===
Year	Winner	Age	Jockey	Trainer	Owner	Time
1991	Victorian Hill	6	Blythe Miller	Janet Elliot	William C. Lickle	5:29.40
1992	Victorian Hill	7	Blythe Miller	Janet Elliot	William C. Lickle	5:31.90
1993	Mistico	7	Sanna Neilson	Jonathan E. Sheppard	R. Dee Hubbard	5:43.00
1994	Mistico	8	Craig Thornton	Jonathan E. Sheppard	R. Dee Hubbard	5:28.60
1995	Lonesome Glory	7	Blythe Miller	F. Bruce Miller	Walter M. Jeffords, Jr.	5:32.80
1996	To Ridley	6	Sean Clancy	Jack Fisher	Mrs. F. Eugene Dixon, Jr.	5:41.80
1997	Correggio	6	Archibald Kingsley	Janet Elliot	William C. Lickle	5:51.80
1998	Rowdy Irishman	9	Vincent Marzullo	Bruce Haynes	Vesta Balestiere	5:51.80
1999	Rowdy Irishman	10	Vincent Marzullo	Bruce Haynes	Vesta Balestiere	5:50.60
2000	Pinkie Swear	6	Sean Clancy	Charles Fenwick Jr.	Arcadia Stable	5:50.00
2001	Rand	7	Eddie Lamb	Mark Oulaghan	Eamon Cleary	5:35.00
2002	All Gong	8	Blythe Miller	F. Bruce Miller	Calvin Houghland	5:32.40
2003	Pelagos	8	Tom Foley	F. Bruce Miller	Mr. & Mrs. Michael E. Hoffman	5:46.60
2004	Tres Touche	7	David Bentley	Richard Hendicks	Estate of Barracuda Stables	5:38.60
2005	Sur La Tete	7	Christopher Read	Neil R. Morris	Kinross Corporation	5:47.40
2006	Sur La Tete	8	Christopher Read	Neil R. Morris	Kinross Corporation	5:47.60
2007	Good Night Shirt	6	Willie Dowling	Jack Fisher	Harold A. Via Jr.	5:50.40
2008	Good Night Shirt	7	Willie Dowling	Jack Fisher	Harold A. Via Jr.	5:47.60
2009	Pierrot Lunaire	5	Chip Miller	F. Bruce Miller	Calvin Houghland	6:27.40
2010	Tax Ruling	7	Darren Nagle	Desmond Fogarty	Irvin S. Naylor	5:37.20
2011	Tax Ruling	8	Darren Nagle	Brianne A. Slater	Irvin S. Naylor	5:46.20
2012	Arcadius	8	Brian Crowley	Jonathan E. Sheppard	Hudson River Farms	5:36.20
2013	Demonstrative	6	Robert Walsh	Richard L. Valentine	Mrs. George L. Ohrstrom Jr.	5:42.20
2014	Divine Fortune	11	William McCarthy	Jonathan E. Sheppard	William L. Pape & Jonathan E. Sheppard	5:39.40
2015	Demonstrative	8	Jack Doyle	Richard L. Valentine	Mrs. George L. Ohrstrom Jr.	5:47.60
2016	Rawnaq	9	Jack Doyle	Cyril Murphy	Irvin S Naylor	5:42.40
2017	Scorpiancer	8	Sean McDermott	Jack Fisher	Bruton Street US	5:37.00
2018	Zanjabeel	5	Ross Geraghty	Richard J Hendricks	Rosbrian Farm	5:36.40
2019	Scorpiancer	10	Sean McDermott	Jack Fisher	Bruton Street US	5:43.80
2020	Not held due to COVID-19					
2021	Snap Decision	7	Graham Watters	Jack Fisher	Bruton Street US	
2022	Snap Decision	8	Graham Watters	Jack Fisher	Bruton Street US	5:40.20
2023	Scaramanga	8	Paul Townend	Willie Mullins	Malcolm C. Denmark	5:49.20
2024	Snap Decision	10	Graham Watters	Jack Fisher	Bruton Street US	5:32.40
2025	Abaan	8	Bernie Dalton	Kate Dalton	Eclipse Thoroughbred Partners and Daigneault Thoroughbreds	5:42
