= Transworld (horse) =

American-bred Thoroughbred racehorse

- Racing silks of Simon Fraser
- Sire: Prince John
- Grandsire: Princequillo
- Dam: Hornpipe
- Damsire: Hornbeam
- Sex: Stallion
- Foaled: 26 February 1974
- Country: United States
- Colour: Chestnut
- Breeder: Elmendorf Farm
- Owner: Simon Fraser, Master of Lovat
- Trainer: Vincent O'Brien
- Record: 5: 3-1-0

Major wins
- Churchill Stakes (1977); Ulster Derby (1977); Irish St. Leger (1977)

Awards
- Timeform rating 121

Transworld (26 February 1974 – 24 June 2001) was an American-bred, Irish-trained Thoroughbred racehorse and sire. Bred in Kentucky he was sent to race in Europe after being sold for $375,000 as a yearling. His brief racing career comprised only five races between May and September 1977 but he showed himself to be a high-class staying colt with wins in the Churchill Stakes, Ulster Derby and Irish St. Leger. He returned to America his stud career and had some success as a breeding stallion. Transworld died in 2001 at the age of 27.

== Background ==
Transworld was a chestnut horse with a broad white blaze and four white socks bred in Kentucky by Elmendorf Farm. As a yearling he was put up for auction and was sold for $375,000. He was sent to race in Europe where he was trained by Vincent O'Brien and competed in the colours of Simon Fraser.

His sire Prince John recorded his biggest win in the Garden State Stakes before his career was ended prematurely by injury. He became a very successful breeding stallion whose other progeny included Speak John, Stage Door Johnny, Typecast, Silent Screen and Deceit. Transworld's dam Hornpipe failed to win a race but produced several other winners including Transworld's full brother Protagonist, the American Champion two-year-old colt of 1973. She was a granddaughter of Galatea who won the 1000 Guineas and Epsom Oaks in 1939.

== Racing career ==
=== 1977: three-year-old season ===
Transworld was unraced as juvenile in 1976 and made his debut in the Group 2 Gallinule Stakes over one and a half miles at the Curragh in May 1977. He showed some promise but finished unplaced behind his stablemate Alleged. In June he was sent to Ascot Racecourse in England for the Churchill Stakes, which was run over one and a half miles on the Saturday following the Royal Ascot meeting. He started favourite and overcame some difficulties in running before pulling away and winning by four lengths from the Guy Harwood-trained Mallard Song. Later that month he was sent to Down Royal in Northern Ireland and recorded a very easy wi in the Ulster Derby. In August at the Curragh he attempted to win his third consecutive race in the Blandford Stakes but was beaten a length into second by the Dermot Weld-trained Panamint with the filly Sassabunda in third.

In the Irish St. Leger at the Curragh on 17 September Transworld was partnered by Tommy Murphy after Lester Piggott opted to ride the O'Brien stables main hope Valinsky, the winner of the Geoffrey Freer Stakes. Despite being rejected by the stable's top jockey, the colt was strongly supported in the betting market and started the 13/2 third choice behind Valinsky and Panamint. The other six runners included Sassabunda, Orchestra (Nijinsky Stakes) and Aristocracy (Whitehall Stakes). Murphy sent Tranworld into the lead from the start and was never seriously challenged, shaking off his closest pursuer Valinsky early in the straight and drawing clear of the field to win by four lengths from Orchestra. His victory gave Vincent O'Brien a third consecutive win in the contest after Caucasus in 1975 and Meneval in 1976.

At the end of the year the independent Timeform organisation gave Transworld a rating of 121, sixteen pounds behind their Horse of the Year Alleged.

== Stud record ==
Transworld was exported to the United States and was expected to continue his track career. He was, however, retired from racing to become a breeding stallion at Elmendorf Farm before moving to the Gainesway Farm in Kentucky and being relocated to the Stonewall Farm in New York in 1994. He died in June 2001 Alexander Farm near Byers, Colorado at the age of 27. The best of his offspring was the outstanding steeplechaser Lonesome Glory but he sired several other top-class performers including Winton (Venezuelan Horse of the Year), Powder Break (Pan American Handicap), The Hague (Hollywood Turf Cup) and Only Queens (Demoiselle Stakes).

== Pedigree ==
Pedigree of Transworld (USA), chestnut stallion, 1974
Sire Prince John (USA) 1953	Princequillo (IRE); 1940	Prince Rose	Rose Prince
Sire Prince John (USA) 1953	Princequillo (IRE); 1940	Prince Rose	Indolence
Sire Prince John (USA) 1953	Princequillo (IRE); 1940	Cosquilla	Papyrus
Sire Prince John (USA) 1953	Princequillo (IRE); 1940	Cosquilla	Quick Thought
Sire Prince John (USA) 1953	Not Afraid (USA); 1948	Count Fleet	Reigh Count
Sire Prince John (USA) 1953	Not Afraid (USA); 1948	Count Fleet	Quickly
Sire Prince John (USA) 1953	Not Afraid (USA); 1948	Banish Fear	Blue Larkspur
Sire Prince John (USA) 1953	Not Afraid (USA); 1948	Banish Fear	Herodiade
Dam Hornpipe (GB) 1965	Hornbeam (GB); 1953	Hyperion	Gainsborough*
Dam Hornpipe (GB) 1965	Hornbeam (GB); 1953	Hyperion	Selene
Dam Hornpipe (GB) 1965	Hornbeam (GB); 1953	Thicket	Nasrullah
Dam Hornpipe (GB) 1965	Hornbeam (GB); 1953	Thicket	Thorn Wood
Dam Hornpipe (GB) 1965	Sugar Bun (USA); 1946	Mahmoud	Blenheim
Dam Hornpipe (GB) 1965	Sugar Bun (USA); 1946	Mahmoud	Mah Mahal*
Dam Hornpipe (GB) 1965	Sugar Bun (USA); 1946	Galatea	Dark Legend
Dam Hornpipe (GB) 1965	Sugar Bun (USA); 1946	Galatea	Galaday (Family:1-n)

* Transworld is inbred 4D x 5D to the stallion Gainsborough, meaning that he appears fourth generation and fifth generation (via Mah Mahal) on the dam side of his pedigree.
