= American Champion Steeplechase Horse =

American horse racing award

The American Champion Steeplechase Horse is an American horse racing honor awarded as part of the Eclipse Award program since its inception in 1971. It is awarded annually to the top horse in steeplechase racing.

Flatterer is the only horse to win the award four times in a row, his last coming at age 7 in 1986. Lonesome Glory has won the Award five times, more than any other horse, and was the oldest ever when he won it for the final time at age 11.

== Honorees ==
Year	Horse	Age	Trainer	Owner
2025	Cool Jet	9	Jack Fisher	Riverdee Stable
2024	Snap Decision	10	Jack Fisher	Bruton Street-US
2023	Merry Maker	6	Archibald J. Kingsley, Jr.	Hurricana Farm
2022	Hewick	7	John Joseph Hanlon	TJ McDonald
2021	The Mean Queen (IRE)	5	Keri Brion	Buttonwood Farm
2020	Moscato	9	Jack Fisher	Bruton Street
2019	Winston C	5	Jonathan E. Sheppard	Hudson River Farms
2018	Zanjabeel	5	Richard J. Hendriks	Rosbrian Farm and Meadow Run Farm
2017	Scorpiancer	8	Jack Fisher	Bruton Street-US
2016	Rawnaq	9	Cyril Murphy	Irvin S. Naylor
2015	Dawalan	5	Cyril Murphy	Irvin S. Naylor
2014	Demonstrative	7	Richard Valentine	Jacqueline Ohrstrom
2013	Divine Fortune	10	Jonathan E. Sheppard	William L. Pape & Jonathan E. Sheppard
2012	Pierrot Lunaire	8	Bruce Miller	Mrs. Calvin Houghland
2011	Black Jack Blues	8	Joseph W. Delozier III	Irvin S. Naylor
2010	Slip Away	7	Thomas H. Voss	Kenneth and Sarah Ramsey
2009	Mixed Up	10	Jonathan E. Sheppard	William L. Pape
2008	Good Night Shirt	7	Jack Fisher	Harold A. Via, Jr.
2007	Good Night Shirt	6	Jack Fisher	Harold A. Via, Jr.
2006	McDynamo	9	Sanna Hendriks	Michael J. Moran
2005	McDynamo	8	Sanna Hendriks	Michael J. Moran
2004	Hirapour	8	P. Douglas Fout	Eldon Farm Racing Stable
2003	McDynamo	6	Sanna Hendriks	Michael J. Moran
2002	Flat Top	9	Janet Elliot	Nancy Gerry
2001	Pompeyo	7	Sanna Hendriks	Augustin Stable
2000	All Gong	6	Bruce Miller	Calvin Houghland
1999	Lonesome Glory	11	Bruce Miller	Kay Jeffords
1998	Flat Top	5	Janet Elliot	Nancy Gerry
1997	Lonesome Glory	9	Bruce Miller	Kay Jeffords
1996	Correggio	5	Charles O'Brien	William C. Lickle
1995	Lonesome Glory	7	Bruce Miller	Kay Jeffords
1994	Warm Spell	4	John K. Griggs	John K. Griggs
1993	Lonesome Glory	5	Bruce Miller	Kay Jeffords
1992	Lonesome Glory	4	Bruce Miller	Kay Jeffords
1991	Morley Street	7	Toby Balding	Michael Jackson Bloodstock
1990	Morley Street	6	Toby Balding	Michael Jackson Bloodstock
1989	Highland Bud	4	Jonathan E. Sheppard	Jesse M. Henley Jr.
1988	Jimmy Lorenzo	6	Jonathan E. Sheppard	Bertram R. Firestone
1987	Inlander	6	Charles Fenwick Jr.	Dogwood Stable
1986	Flatterer	7	Jonathan E. Sheppard	William L. Pape
1985	Flatterer	6	Jonathan E. Sheppard	William L. Pape
1984	Flatterer	5	Jonathan E. Sheppard	William L. Pape
1983	Flatterer	4	Jonathan E. Sheppard	William L. Pape
1982	Zaccio	6	W. Burling Cocks	Bunny Murdock
1981	Zaccio	5	W. Burling Cocks	Bunny Murdock
1980	Zaccio	4	W. Burling Cocks	Bunny Murdock
1979	Martie's Anger	4	Jonathan E. Sheppard	William L. Pape
1978	Cafe Prince	8	Jonathan E. Sheppard	Augustin Stable
1977	Cafe Prince	7	Jonathan E. Sheppard	Augustin Stable
1976	Straight and True	6	Michael Smithwick Sr.	Lillian Bostwick Phipps
1975	Life's Illusion	4	Paul R. Fout	Virginia Guest
1974	Gran Kan	8	Clarence Furr	Florence L. Clark
1973	Athenian Idol	5	Jonathan E. Sheppard	William L. Pape
1972	Soothsayer	5	Peter M. Howe	Marion duPont Scott
1971	Shadow Brook	7	Sidney Watters Jr.	Stephen C. Clark Jr.

=== Daily Racing Form, Turf & Sport Digest and Thoroughbred Racing Association Awards ===
Year	Horse	Age	Trainer	Owner
1970	Top Bid	6	D.M Smithwick	Mrs Ogden Phipps
1969	L'Escargot	6	Dan Moore	Raymond R. Guest
1968	Bon Nouvel	8	D.M Smithwick	Mrs. Theodora A. Randolph
1967	Quick Pitch	7	E.B Ryan	F.P Ryan
1966	Mako (DRF)	6	D.M Smithwick	Mrs Ogden Phipps
1966	Tuscalee (TRA)	6	Joe Aitcheson, Sr.	Alfred H. Smith
1965	Bon Nouvel	5	D.M Smithwick	Mrs. Theodora A. Randolph
1964	Bon Nouvel	4	D.M Smithwick	Mrs. Theodora A. Randolph
1963	Amber Driver	6	S. Watters Jr	Mrs. S.C Clark Jr
1962	Barnabys Bluff	4	G.H Bostwick	G.H Bostwick
1961	Peal	5	C.V.B Cushman Jr	H.A Love
1960	Benguala	6	R.G Woolf	Montpelier
1959	Ancestor	10	D.M Smithwick	Mrs Ogden Phipps
1958	Neji	8	D.M Smithwick	Lillian Bostwick Phipps
1957	Neji	7	D.M Smithwick	Lillian Bostwick Phipps
1956	Shipboard	6	R.G Woolf	Montpelier
1955	Neji	5	Pete Bostwick	Lillian Bostwick Phipps
1954	King Commander	5	E.E Weymouth	Mrs L.R Troiano
1953	The Mast	6	J.E Ryan	Mrs. J.R.H Thouron
1952	Jam (DRF)	5	M.H Dixon Jr.	J.F McHugh
1952	Oedipus (TRA)	6	James E. Fitzsimmons	Lillian Bostwick Phipps
1951	Oedipus	5	James E. Fitzsimmons	Lillian Bostwick Phipps
1950	Oedipus	4	James E. Fitzsimmons	Lillian Bostwick Phipps

=== Daily Racing Form and Turf & Sport Digest Awards ===
Year	Horse	Age	Trainer	Owner
1949	Trough Hill	7	J.T Skinner	Mrs. S.C Clark Jr
1948	American Way	6	J.T Skinner	Rockeby Stable
1947	War Battle	6	K.Miller	K.Miller
1946	Elkridge	8	Thomas Hitchcock	Kent Miller
1945	Mercator	6	W.G Jones	W.H Lipscomb
1944	Rouge Dragon	6	W.G Jones	M.A Cushman
1943	Brother Jones	7	W.R Miller	H.E Talbott
1942	Elkridge	4	Thomas Hitchcock	Kent Miller
1941	Speculate	5	W. Passmore	Bayard Sharp
1937	Jungle King	7	V. Powers	Greentree Stable
1936	Bushranger	6	J. Howard Lewis	Joeseph Widener
