= Warner Parks =

- Warner Park Historic District
- U.S. National Register of Historic Places
- U.S. Historic district
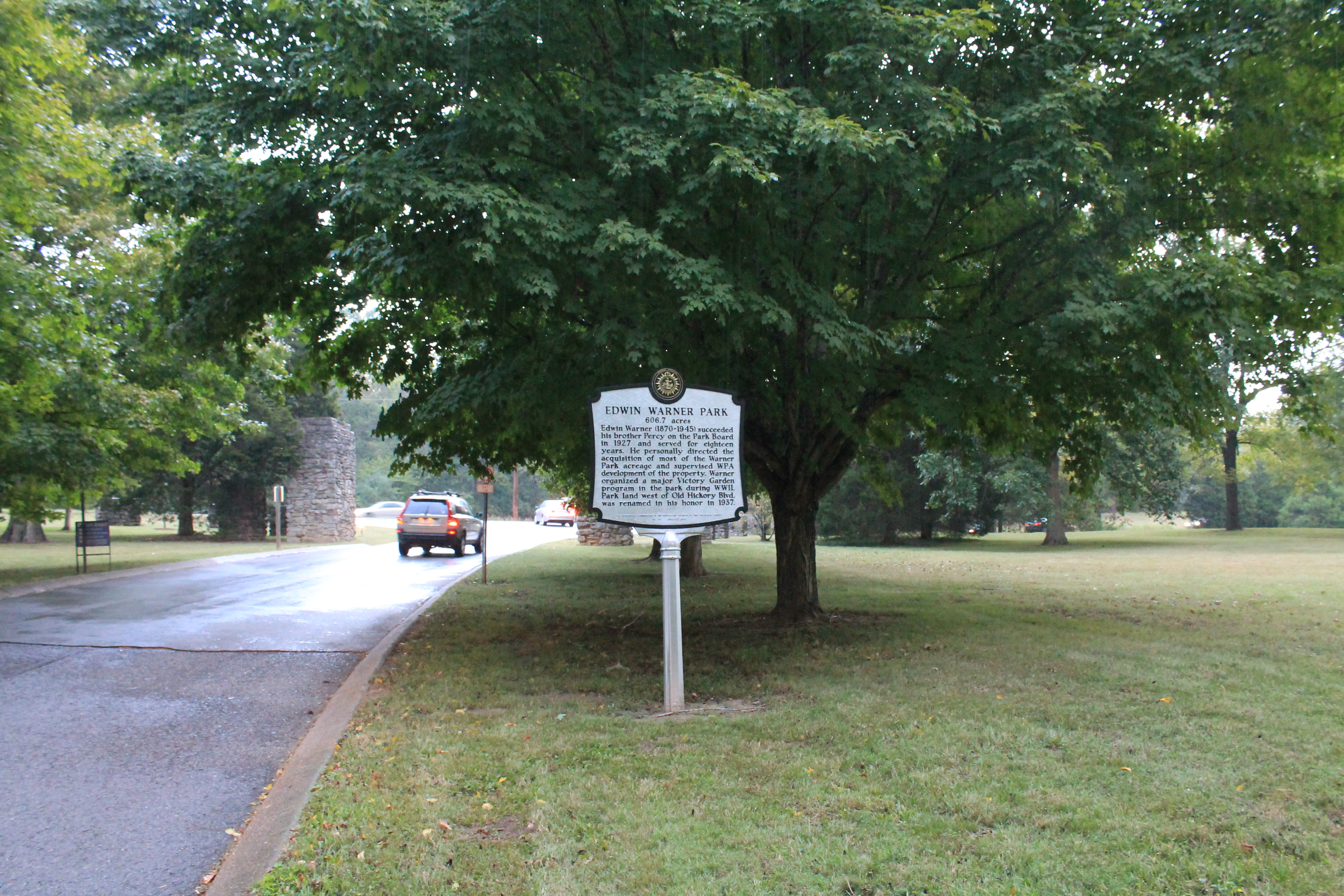
- Historic marker within Edwin Warner Park

- Location within Tennessee Location within the United States
- Location: Roughly bounded by Little Harpeth River, Belle Meade Blvd., Tenn. Hwy. 100, and Chickering Rd., Nashville, Tennessee
- Coordinates: 36°3′47″N 86°53′30″W
- Area: 2,664 acres (1,078 ha)
- Built: 1927, 1930 and 1941
- NRHP reference No.: 84003528
- Added to NRHP: January 20, 1984

Edwin Warner Park and Percy Warner Park, collectively known as Warner Parks, are two major public parks in Nashville, Tennessee. They are part of the park system managed by the Metropolitan Board of Parks and Recreation of Nashville and Davidson County. Percy Warner Park's front entrance is located at the end of Belle Meade Boulevard. The parks are listed on the National Register of Historic Places as Warner Park Historic District. The district is primarily within Nashville along the southern edge of Davidson County, Tennessee, but it extends into Williamson County, Tennessee as well.

The two parks are adjacent to each other, separated by Old Hickory Boulevard, and are located approximately 9 mi (14 km) from downtown Nashville. They are bounded on the northwest by Tennessee State Route 100, on the east and north by Chickering Road, and partially on the south by Old Hickory Blvd. and Vaughn Road. The two parks cover 2,684 acres (1,086.2 ha), making the combined parks the second largest municipal park in the state (after Bays Mountain Park in Kingsport which is 3,750 acres). The parks offer a variety of activities, including hiking trails, cross country courses, and an equestrian center.

Through funds raised by Friends of Warner Parks, the Warner Parks system added 448 acres in late 2014, expanding the park to more than 3,000 acres. Two properties were purchased for this expansion to enhance the park resources, including the 225-acre Burch Reserve with wooded hills and an old-growth forest previously owned by H. G. Hill Realty. The Burch Reserve is home to Nashville's largest cave in addition to small ponds, meadows and forestry. Ridges and hollows of the former H. G. Hill property are part of what is considered the largest old growth forest in an urban area east of the Mississippi.

== History ==
Percy Warner Park as seen from the top of the steps at the entrance to the park, looking down Belle Meade Boulevard

The parks were opened in 1927, and are on land donated by Percie Warner Lea and her husband, Luke. The parks were named for her father, Percy, a member of the old Nashville Board of Park Commissioners and former head of the city's streetcar lines and electric utility, and her uncle Edwin, who was also a park commissioner. The commission developed the parks into their present layout through 1930. A large, ceremonial-style entrance to Percy Warner Park, reminiscent of a European allee, along with many other, smaller native Tennessee limestone structures in and adjacent to the parks, were constructed by the Works Progress Administration during the New Deal era shortly afterwards.

The parks were named to the National Register of Historic Places in 1984. The listing was for a 2,664-acre (1,078 ha) historic district. When listed, the district included five contributing buildings, 36 contributing structures, and 14 contributing sites. Also included were 10 non-contributing buildings, eight non-contributing structures, and five non-contributing sites.

The district has dates of significance in 1927, 1930, and 1941. The park was assembled by additions of parcels during 1927–1930. More recently there was a significant addition of land across Tennessee State Route 100 from the rest of the park, purchased from the H. G. Hill family and consisting predominately of old-growth virgin forest, in 2010. The fund raising effort for this purpose was headed by local attorney Warner Bass, grandson and great-nephew of park namesakes Edwin and Percy Warner, respectively, and coordinated through the parks' charitable support group, Friends of Warner Parks.

The Warner Park Historic District was further designated a Nashville landmark in 1998.

== Activities ==
The parks offer a variety of trails for running and biking. Cars can drive through parts of Percy Warner park as well. There are also equestrian trails, athletic fields, and a golf course. Percy Warner Park is characterized by a group of steps built into the mountain located at the entrance to the park. Walkers can traverse these steps to reach the base of many hiking and biking trails.

The parks are home to a steeplechase course that hosts the Iroquois Steeplechase, run annually each May since 1941 (with one year off for World War II) and another (2020) due to the worldwide COVID-19 pandemic. It is a fixture on the National Steeplechase Association circuit. It is the only graded horse race, steeplechase or flat, that is currently run in the state. It is also home to the TSSAA state championship in cross-country.

The parks are also home to two golf courses, the 18-hole Harpeth Hills Golf Course and 9-hole Percy Warner Golf Course, the Warner Park Nature Center, the Rock and Road Relay, Marathon, and 5K. and the Harpeth Hills Flying Monkey Marathon.

The Swan Ball, the prestigious white tie fundraiser, moved to Warner Parks as of 2025.
