= Cafe Prince =

American-bred Thoroughbred racehorse

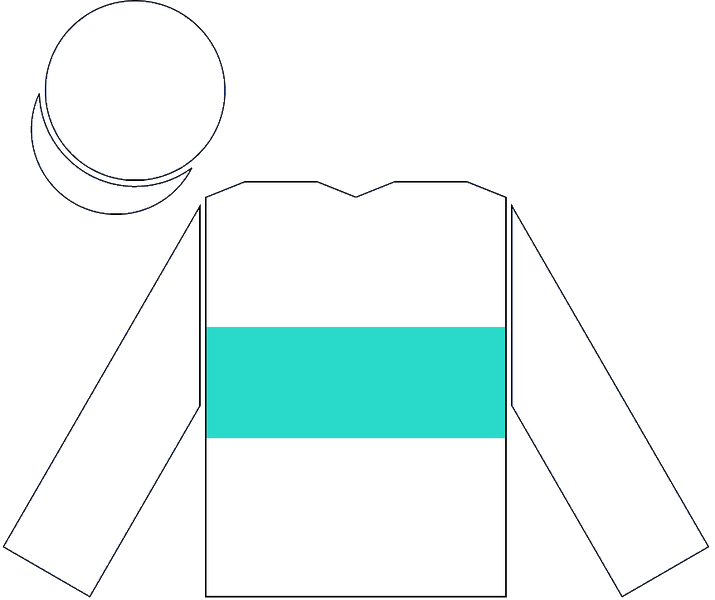
- Racing silks of George Strawbridge
- Sire: Crème dela Creme
- Grandsire: Olympia
- Dam: Princess Blair
- Damsire: Blue Prince
- Sex: Gelding
- Foaled: 1970
- Country: United States
- Colour: Bay
- Breeder: Verne Winchell
- Owner: Augustin Stable
- Trainer: Jonathan E. Sheppard
- Record: 52: 18-5-4
- Earnings: $228,238

Major wins
- Lovely Night Steeplechase Handicap (1974, 1979); Colonial Cup International Steeplechase (1975, 1977); King of Spain International Gold Cup Steeplechase (1978); American Grand National (1978)

Awards
- U.S. Champion Steeplechase horse (1977, 1978)

Honours
- United States Racing Hall of Fame inductee (1985)

Cafe Prince (foaled 1970 in California) was an American Thoroughbred Champion steeplechase racehorse. A descendant through his dam and his sire of the great runner and sire, Nearco, he was bred by "Donut King" Verne Winchell and purchased as a yearling at the Saratoga Yearling sales by George W. Strawbridge, Jr. who raced him throughout his career under his Augustin Stable colors.

Trained by future Hall of Fame trainer, Jonathan Sheppard, in 1977 Café Prince won the first of two Colonial Cups and earned that year's Eclipse Award for Outstanding Steeplechase horse. In 1978 he won his second consecutive Colonial Cup plus he won the American Grand National, performances which helped earn him another Eclipse Award for Outstanding Steeplechase horse. The following year Café Prince continued to win and set course records at Fair Hill, Maryland and at the Saratoga Race Course.

Cafe Prince raced through age ten before being retired at the end of the 1980 season. In 1985, he was inducted in the National Museum of Racing and Hall of Fame.
