= Jonathan E. Sheppard =

American horse trainer (1940–2023)

Jonathan Sheppard
Personal information
- Born: December 2, 1940 Ashwell, Hertfordshire, England
- Died: August 27, 2023 (aged 82) Hollywood, Florida, U.S.
- Occupation: Trainer

Horse racing career
- Sport: Horse racing
- Career winnings: $88,679,925
- Career wins: 3,426, including 1,242 steeplechase

Major racing wins
- Steeplechase: Colonial Cup Steeplechase (1975, 1977, 1979, 1983, 1984, 1985, 1986, 1988, 1989, 1991, 1992, 1999, 2000); New York Turf Writers Cup Handicap (1979, 1983, 1984, 1989, 1990, 1991, 1992, 1994,1997, 2000, 2001, 2006); Royal Chase for the Sport of Kings Hurdle (2002, 2007, 2008) Flat racing: Flower Bowl Invitational Stakes (1982, 1983); Diana Handicap (1993, 2008, 2009); Black Helen Handicap (1995, 1997); Man o' War Stakes (2001, 2002); Sword Dancer Invitational Handicap (2001, 2002); United Nations Handicap (2002); First Lady Stakes (2008); Humana Distaff Handicap (2009); Vinery Madison Stakes (2009); Jenny Wiley Stakes (2009); Chicago Handicap (2009); Arlington Handicap (2009); Northern Dancer Turf Stakes (2009); Kentucky Cup Turf Stakes (2009); Valedictory Stakes (2009); Dixie Stakes (2014) Breeders' Cup wins: Breeders' Cup Grand National Steeplechase (1988, 1989, 1992, 1999); Breeders' Cup Filly & Mare Turf (2008); Breeders' Cup Filly & Mare Sprint (2009)

Racing awards
- U.S. Champion Steeplechase trainer by earnings (1973-1990, 1992, 1993, 1994, 1996, 1999, 2007)

Honours
- National Museum of Racing and Hall of Fame (1990); Jonathan Sheppard Stakes at Saratoga Race Course

Significant horses
- Cafe Prince, Flatterer, Highland Bud, Storm Cat, Forever Together, Cloudy's Knight, Informed Decision

Jonathan E. Sheppard (December 2, 1940 – August 27, 2023) was an English Hall of Fame trainer in American Thoroughbred horse racing. He holds the record for the most wins in American steeplechase racing history with 1,242 victories and led with the most U.S. steeplechase wins per year, a record of 26 times between 1972 and his retirement in 2020.

Through his career, Sheppard had considerable success in both steeplechase and flat racing. In both venues, he had a long working relationship with stable owner George W. Strawbridge Jr., and in 2008 he conditioned Strawbridge's filly Forever Together to victory in the Breeders' Cup Filly & Mare Turf.

== Achievements ==
=== Steeplechase ===
Sheppard came to the United States in 1961 and in 1966 won his first race with his horse Haffaday in a steeplechase event at My Lady's Manor, Maryland. In 1973, he won his first earnings championship in steeplechase racing. He went on to win the earnings title another twenty-three times. He trained the winner of four Breeders' Cup Grand National Steeplechases and holds the record for most wins in the Colonial Cup Steeplechase with eleven. Sheppard is the only trainer to win the American Steeplechase Triple Crown, doing it with Flatterer, the only horse to win the Eclipse Award for Outstanding Steeplechase horse four years in a row.

On September 25, 2010, he achieved his 1,000th steeplechase victory as a trainer. At Monmouth Park Racetrack his trainee Arcadius took the US$100,000 Helen Haskell Sampson Stake (NSA-G1) by a length under Brian Crowley. He became the first trainer to send out 1,000 jump winners in the United States. This is considered an impressive milestone, considering the low annual volume of National Steeplechase Association sanctioned races.

On October 29, 2011, with the victory of the runner 'Dugan' at the Aiken Fall Races, Sheppard's career winnings in National Steeplechase Association races rose by US$9,000 to US$20,002,192. The British-born trainer was the first in American sports ever to pass the US$20 million mark, unadjusted for inflation. His closest competitor, Jack Fisher, had yet to hit the US$10,000,000 mark at that time.

=== Flat racing ===
Sheppard achieved his 3,000th win as a flat trainer on Monday, September 17, 2012, when Fugitive Angel won the seventh race at Delaware Park in Stanton, Delaware. Sheppard became the 28th trainer in North American racing history to win 3,000 races. The 5-year-old horse was bred and owned by longtime client George Strawbridge Jr. and his Augustin Stables.

=== Saratoga Race Course ===
Sheppard won at least one race in every annual Saratoga Race Course meet since 1969 through and including 2015. This 47 year streak is a record unmatched by any other trainer. His 1st 2015 Race Meet victory was scored by Lune de Caro (TX) in a steeplechase race on August 18, 2015. Jonathan remarked to the Times Union, “I said if I didn’t win one (at Saratoga) this year, I wouldn’t come back”.

His winning streak of a win every summer at Saratoga ended with the 2015 meet. He failed to win at Saratoga during 2016 meet, thus ending the streak at 47.

Sheppard was the leading Saratoga trainer in 1984 and 1985.

=== Recognition and awards ===
In 1990, he was inducted into the National Museum of Racing and Hall of Fame.

In 2004, Sheppard was elected president of the National Steeplechase Association. In 2008, Sheppard joined fellow Hall of Fame inductee Sidney Watters, Jr. as the only men in American racing to have trained a champion over both jumps and on the flat. As of 2010, Sheppard's horses had won twelve Eclipse Awards:

- Athenian Idol (1973)
- Cafe Prince (1977, 1978)
- Martie's Anger (1979)
- Flatterer (1983, 1984, 1985, 1986)
- Jimmy Lorenzo (1988)
- Highland Bud (1989)
- Forever Together (2008)
- Informed Decision (2009)
- Divine Fortune (2013)

== Death ==
Sheppard died due to complications from late-stage lyme disease at his home in Hollywood, Florida, on August 27, 2023, at the age of 82.
