= Meadow Brook Hurdle Stakes =

Meadow Brook Hurdle Stakes discontinued
- Class: Grade I (1999-2004); Grade II (2005)
- Location: Belmont Park; Elmont, NY
- Inaugurated: 1999
- Final run: 2005
- Race type: Thoroughbred (Steeplechase)

Race information
- Distance: 2 1/2 Miles (2000-2005); 2 1/4 Miles (1999)
- Track: Left-handed
- Qualification: Four-year-olds and older
- Purse: $75,000 (2005) $100,000 (1999-2004)

The Meadow Brook Hurdle Stakes was an American Thoroughbred hurdle race held at Belmont Park from 1999 to 2005 for four-year-olds and up. The race was traditionally run the Thursday before the Belmont Stakes in early June. The race was the third leg of the NSA's Steeplechase Triple Crown.

== History ==
The inaugural race was run on June 3, 1999, and was won by Popular Gigalo.

In 2000, the race distance was extended from 2 1/4 Miles to 2 1/2 Miles. The race itself saw Yellowroad deny Pompeyo the Steeplechase Triple Crown.

In 2004, the National Steeplechase Association changed the Steeplechase Triple Crown after the first two races: the Hard Scuffle Hurdle Stakes at Churchill Downs, and the Joe Aitcheson Hurdle Stakes at Pimlico Race Course, were discontinued. The races were replaced with the Georgia Cup in Kingston, Georgia, and the National Hunt Cup in Malvern, Pennsylvania. Meanwhile, the Meadow Brook Hurdle Stakes remained the third leg.

In 2005, the race was downgraded to a Grade II and the purse was reduced to $75,000. It was also moved to the day after the Belmont Stakes. The final running of the race was won by 34/1 longshot Paradise's Boss. The race was discontinued shortly afterwards.

== Winners ==
Year	Winner	Age	Jockey	Trainer	Owner	Time
2005	Paradise's Boss	5	Xavier Aizpuru	Jack Fisher	Mrs. Henry F. Stern	4:33.95
2004	Sur La Tete	6	Christopher Read	Neil R. Morris	Kinross Corporation	4:36.53
2003	Trebizond	7	Tom Foley	Katherine S. Neilson	William C. Lickle	4:57.65
2002	Sharp Face	6	F. Bruce Miller Jr.	Jack Fisher	F. Eugene Dixon Jr.	4:37.32
2001	Praise the Prince	6	Gus M. Brown	Sanna Neilson	Augustin Stables	4:49.27
2000	Yellowroad	5	Jonathan Kiser	F. Bruce Miller	Walter M. Jeffords Jr.	4:41.95
1999	Popular Gigalo	5	F. Bruce Miller Jr.	F. Bruce Miller	Clorevia Farm	4:02.26
