= Joe Aitcheson Hurdle Stakes =

Joe Aitcheson Hurdle Stakes discontinued
- Class: Grade I (NSA)
- Location: Pimlico Race Course; Baltimore, MD
- Inaugurated: 1997
- Final run: 2002
- Race type: Thoroughbred (Steeplechase)

Race information
- Distance: 2 1/16 Miles (1997); 2 1/8 Miles (1998-2002)
- Track: Left-handed
- Qualification: Four-year-olds and older
- Purse: $35,000 (1997-1998) $100,000 (1999; 2001-2002) $107,700 (2000)

The Joe Aitcheson Hurdle Stakes was an American Grade I Thoroughbred hurdle race held at Pimlico Race Course from 1997 to 2002 for four-year-olds and up. The race was named after Maryland jockey Joe Aitcheson Jr.

For most of its existence, the race was the second leg of the NSA's Steeplechase Triple Crown, with the other legs being the Hard Scuffle Hurdle Stakes at Churchill Downs, and the Meadow Brook Hurdle Stakes at Belmont Park.

== History ==
On June 19, 1997 the inaugural Joseph L. Aitheson Jr. Novice Hurdle Stakes was run and was won by Batchwood.

In 1998, the distance was extended from 2 1/16 Miles to 2 1/8 Miles.

In 1999, the race was moved to the Thursday before the Preakness Stakes. The race was also promoted to a Grade I status and its purse was increased from $35,000 to $100,000.

In 2002, the race was again moved to the Friday before the Preakness Stakes, sharing the card with the Black-Eyed Susan Stakes. The final running of the race was won by Anofferucantrefuse, defeating McDynamo.

In 2003, the race was cancelled due to heavy rain, and was unable to be rescheduled. The race was discontinued the next year.

== Winners ==
| Year | Horse | Age | Jockey | Trainer | Owner | Time |
|---|---|---|---|---|---|---|
| 2002 | Anofferucantrefuse | 5 | Roger A. Horgan | Thomas H. Voss | Fox Ridge Farm, Inc. | 3:41.74 |
| 2001 | Flasher | 7 | F. Bruce Miller, Jr. | James M. Day | Daybreak Stables, Inc. | 3:45.30 |
| 2000 | Pompeyo | 6 | Gus M. Brown | Sanna Neilson | Augustin Stables | 3:52.41 |
| 1999 | Grand Nord | 5 | Jonathan Kiser | Paul Douglas Fout | Beverly R. Steinman | 3:45.03 |
| 1998 | Lafitte the Pirate | 5 | Archibald Kingsley, Jr. | Janet E. Elliot | William C. Lickle | 3:49.67 |
| 1997 | Batchwood | 5 | Sean Clancy | Jack Fisher | Sheila J. Williams | 3:41.61 |
