= Hard Scuffle Hurdle Stakes =

Hard Scuffle Hurdle Stakes discontinued
- Class: Grade I (NSA)
- Location: Churchill Downs; Louisville, KY
- Inaugurated: 1998
- Final run: 2003
- Race type: Thoroughbred (Steeplechase)

Race information
- Distance: 2 1/16 Miles (1999-2003); 2 1/2 Miles (1998)
- Track: Left-handed
- Qualification: Four-year-olds and older
- Purse: $100,000

The Hard Scuffle Hurdle Stakes was an American Grade I Thoroughbred hurdle race held at Churchill Downs from 1998 to 2003 for four-year-olds and up. For most of its existence, the race was the first leg of the NSA's Steeplechase Triple Crown, with the other legs being the Joe Aitcheson Hurdle Stakes at Pimlico, and the Meadow Brook Hurdle Stakes at Belmont Park.

== History ==
The inaugural race was run on June 28, 1998, and was won by Lonesome Glory.

In 1999, the race was moved to the Thursday before the Kentucky Derby, and was shortened from 2 1/2 Miles, to a distance of 2 1/16 Miles.

In 2000, Pompeyo won the race, setting the race record of 3:45.22.

In 2004, the race was discontinued due to contract disputes with horsemen over purse money. As a result, the National Steeplechase Association reorganized the Steeplechase Triple Crown.

== Winners ==
Year	Winner	Age	Jockey	Trainer	Owner	Time
2003	Trebizond	7	Robert Massey	Katherine S. Neilson	William C. Lickle	3:45.97
2002	McDynamo	5	Craig Thornton	Sanna Neilson	Michael J. Moran	3:48.00
2001	Praise the Prince	6	Gus M. Miller	Sanna Neilson	Augustin Stables	3:49.00
2000	Pompeyo	6	Gus M. Miller	Sanna Neilson	Augustin Stables	3:45.22
1999	Popular Gigalo	5	F. Bruce Miller	F. Bruce Miller Jr.	Clorevia Farm	3:47.76
1998	Lonesome Glory	10	Blythe Miller	Bruce Miller	Walter M. Jeffords Jr.	4:28.55
