= Warm Spell =

American-bred Thoroughbred racehorse

- Sire: Northern Baby
- Grandsire: Northern Dancer
- Dam: Smilin' Sera
- Damsire: Explodent
- Sex: Gelding
- Foaled: 1988
- Country: United States
- Colour: Chestnut
- Breeder: Robert Kluener
- Owner: John K. Griggs
- Trainer: John K. Griggs
- Record: 19: 12-3-1
- Earnings: $457,964

Major wins
- New York Turf Writers Cup Steeplechase (1993); Temple Gwathmey Steeplechase (1993); A.P. Smithwick Memorial (1993, 1994); Breeders' Cup Grand National Hurdle(1994)

Awards
- Eclipse Award for Outstanding Steeplechase horse (1994)

Warm Spell (1988–1994) was an American Eclipse Award winning thoroughbred racehorse, a Kentucky-bred son of Northern Baby, owned and trained by John K. Griggs and bred by Robert Kluener. He was ridden primarily by the owner/trainer's son, Kirk Griggs.

In 1994 Warm Spell won the Eclipse Award for Outstanding Steeplechase horse, and his career ended with him as the Number 2 all-time leading American steeplechase earner. He was over $120,000 ahead of Lonesome Glory, with the two having split decisions in their head-to-head meetings. Warm Spell won The American Grand National in 1994.

At 3: WON Raymond G. Wolfe Memorial Hurdle; Future Champions Cup hurdle.

At 4: WON Coca-Cola Steeplechase H.; 3RD Iroquois Steeplechase H.

At 5: WON New York Turf Writers Cup Steeplechase H.; A.P. Smithwick Memorial; Temple Gwathmey Steeplechase H.; 2nd Iroquois Stp S.

At 6: WON A.P. Smithwick Memorial; Breeders' Cup Grand National Hurdle S., Atlanta Cup Hurdle H.; 2ND Iroquois Steeplechase S., Temple Gwathmey Hurdle H.

Eclipse Champion Steeplechaser, 1994.

At 5: NTR Saratoga, 16.5f in 3:42.4.

Warm Spell died in 1994 and was buried in Camden, South Carolina on the Springdale Race Course, site of the NSA G-1 Colonial Cup.
