= George W. Strawbridge Jr. =

American hockey executive (born 1937)

George Strawbridge Jr.

Owner of the Buffalo Sabres
- In office 1970–1998 Serving with Seymour H. Knox III, Northrup Knox, & Robert O. Swados
- Preceded by: Position established
- Succeeded by: John Rigas

Owner of the Tampa Bay Rowdies
- In office 1974–1983 Serving with Beau Rogers, IV
- Preceded by: Position established
- Succeeded by: Stella Thayer, Bob Blanchard & Dick Corbett

Personal details
- Born: October 10, 1937 (age 89) Philadelphia, Pennsylvania, US
- Party: Republican
- Spouse: Nina Gill Stewart (divorced)
- Children: 3
- Education: Trinity College, University of Pennsylvania
- Occupation: Educator, historian, investor, sportsman

George W. Strawbridge Jr. (born October 10, 1937) is an American educator, historian, investor, sportsman and philanthropist.

== Biography ==
Born in Philadelphia, Pennsylvania, he was the son of Margaret ("Peggy") Dorrance and the stockbroker George W. Strawbridge Sr. He is a great grandson of William Weightman through his grandmother Louisa Weightman Strawbridge, who was Weightman's daughter and wife of John Strawbridge. He studied at Trinity College in Hartford, Connecticut, where he earned a bachelor's degree. He furthered his studies at the University of Pennsylvania, where he specialized in Latin American history and politics, earning a master's degree and his doctorate. For a time, Strawbridge was an adjunct professor at Widener University in Chester, Pennsylvania, where he remains a member of its board of trustees.

== Campbell Soup Company ==
George Strawbridge Jr.'s mother was the daughter of Dr. John Thompson Dorrance, owner of the Campbell's. On her father's death, she inherited a significant interest in the company. George Strawbridge Jr. was a member of the board of directors of the Campbell Soup Company from 1988 to 2009, filling the vacancy left by his ailing father, who died in 1990. He served as a member of the company's audit committee and a member of the finance & corporate development committee.

== Tampa Bay Rowdies and indoor soccer advocacy ==
Strawbridge was the co-owner, then majority owner of the Tampa Bay Rowdies soccer franchise of the old North American Soccer League from the team's founding in July 1974 until he and later partners Lamar Hunt and Bill McNutt sold the club after the 1983 season to investors Stella Thayer, Bob Blanchard and Dick & Cornelia Corbett. The team would win the NASL Soccer Bowl championship for him in their first season and finish as runners-up in both 1978 and 1979. His teams also had great success in the league's indoor circuit, thrice winning titles (1976, 1979-80 and 1983) and twice runners-up (1975 and 1981–82).

It was his long-held belief that the best way to grow the sport's fan appeal, as well as develop young American talent was through the fast-paced, higher-scoring indoor game, rather than overspending on foreign talent. He repeatedly lobbied the other owners to consider playing a full indoor regular season instead of just the two-tiered tournaments of 1975 and 1976. As early as a 1975 owners meeting, he brought in public relations experts to show his peers what indoor's full potential was. Indeed, in 1976, 1977 and 1978 other owners were poised to follow his lead, only to have various obstacles pull the plug on "his" winter season. Undaunted, Strawbridge and a few other owners pressed on, using indoor friendlies as part of their training and build up to the outdoor season. In the meantime the rival Major Indoor Soccer League set up shop in 1977 and began play in 1978. Just as Strawbridge predicted, the MISL games drew thousands of new fans and young American talent almost from the start. Now fearing that they were missing an opportunity, enough owners acquiesced and in November 1979 the first full NASL indoor season finally commenced. By season's end on March 2, 1980 it was only fitting that NASL indoor soccer's original champion, George Strawbridge, would see his Rowdies crowned as champions of the league's first full indoor season.

== Investments ==
George Strawbridge Jr. joined the board of directors of the Delaware Trust Company in December 1978. In May 1987 Delaware Trust was taken over by Meridian Bancorp Inc., at the time Pennsylvania's fifth-largest bank holding company. In the fall of 1995, CoreStates Financial Corporation acquired Meridian Bancorp for $3.2 billion, and Strawbridge became the largest individual shareholder in Corestates Financial Corporation and was named to its board of directors. In April 1998, CoreStates Financial Corporation merged with First Union Corporation in the largest merger at the time in the history of American banking. Later, First Union merged with Wachovia Corporation, which was later acquired by Wells Fargo Bank during the 2008 banking crisis and dismantled in 2011.

== Buffalo Sabres ==
Strawbridge was an active shareholder and director of the Buffalo Sabres NHL ice hockey club and a member of the team's executive committee for more than thirty years. In 2004, he was inducted in the Buffalo Sabres Hall of Fame. According to WGR 550 sports radio in Buffalo, New York, "In the 1990s, Strawbridge expanded revenue streams and played a leading role in producing new capital for the franchise. When illness and other factors forced the Knox family to limit their involvement, it was Strawbridge's commitment to Buffalo hockey that helped keep the Sabres alive."

== Augustin Stable ==
Strawbridge acquired acreage in the Brandywine Valley in southeastern Pennsylvania and established Augustin Stable as his breeding and racing operation for both steeplechase and flat racing. Now divorced, he makes his home in Cochranville near his Derry Meeting Farm. Active in the National Steeplechase Association (NSA), Strawbridge has served as its president, chairman and chairman emeritus and is a member of the board of directors of the National Steeplechase Museum in Camden, South Carolina. The all-time leading money-winning steeplechase owner in the United States, in 1979 the NSA honored him with their F. Ambrose Clark Award given to someone "who has done the most to promote, improve and encourage the growth of steeplechasing in America". In 2010 Augustin Stable received the Keeneland Mark of Distinction for their contribution to Keeneland and the Thoroughbred industry.

Since 1976, Strawbridge has been a member of The Jockey Club and along with Ogden Mills Phipps, is one of only two Americans to be members of the Jockey Club of Canada. Strawbridge also sits on the board of trustees of the National Museum of Racing and Hall of Fame. He is also a former owner of Tybridge Farm in Chesapeake City, Maryland.

His Thoroughbreds compete in flat racing across North America and in Europe. He bred many of the horses that he raced. His notable runners includes:

=== Steeplechase racing ===
- Cafe Prince (b. 1970) – United States Champion Steeplechaser (1977, 1978). Inducted in the National Museum of Racing and Hall of Fame in 1985.

=== Flat racing ===
- Waya (b. 1974) – 1979 Eclipse Award as the American Champion Older Female Horse
- Treizieme (b. 1981) – In France, won G1 Grand Critérium
- Silver Fling (b. 1985) – won G1 Prix de l'Abbaye
- Turgeon (b. 1986) – named for Buffalo Sabres player Pierre Turgeon. Raced in Europe where he won Group One races in France and Ireland.
- Tikkanen (b. 1991) – named for NHL hockey player, Esa Tikkanen. Wins included the 1994 Turf Classic and Breeders' Cup Turf.
- With Anticipation (b. 1995) – in USA won the 2002 United Nations Stakes and back-to-back runnings of the Man o' War Stakes in 2001-2002 and namesake of the With Anticipation Stakes.
- Rochester (b. 1996) – Green Dancer – Central City (GB), by Midyan. Bred by George Strawbridge Jr. Career earnings topped $1.2 million. Raced 51 times, from 1998 through 2006 as a multiple graded stakes winner. Wins included the Sycamore BC at Keeneland three times, the last at age 9, and the Kentucky Cup Turf Handicap at Kentucky Downs twice, and Elkhorn Stakes. One of the oldest horses in US to win a graded stakes at 9. Returned as a steeplechaser in 2008 and won his first 2 starts; since retired.
- Montare (b. 2002) – multiple stakes winner in France including the G1 Prix Royal-Oak
- Lucarno (b. 2004) – in England, won the 2007 St. Leger Stakes, one of the British Classic Races
- Forever Together (b. 2004) – 2008 winner of the Breeders' Cup Filly & Mare Turf
- Informed Decision (b. 2005) – 2009 winner of the Breeders' Cup Filly & Mare Sprint
- Rainbow View (b. 2006) – Named the 2008 European Champion Two-year-old Filly
- Gatewood (b. 2009) – a homebred based in England, won the 2012 Listed Wolferton Stakes at Royal Ascot
- Moonlight Cloud (b. 2008) – homebred filly, winner of six G1 French races; since retired.

=== As a breeder ===
- Bricks and Mortar - American Horse of the Year.
- Selkirk (b. 1988) – won G1 Queen Elizabeth II Stakes, Champion Miler of Europe in 1991 and 1992. Champion 3-year-old colt and older male in England. Champion older male in France. Retired to stud, in 2006 he was the leading British sire of European Group/Stakes winners.
- Collier Hill (b. 1998) – won major races in Ireland, Sweden, Germany, Canada, and Hong Kong.
- We Are (IRE) (b. 2011) – bred in Ireland by Strawbrige, and owned by him, won the Prix de l'Opera Longines (Fr-I) at Longchamp October 5, 2014. She had finished first in the Pour Moi Coolmore Prix Saint-Alary (Fr-I) May 25, 2014 but was DQ'd due to elevated testosterone levels. These were naturally occurring as the filly was suffering from an ovarian tumor.

For seven consecutive years [2007 – 2013] George Strawbridge Jr.’s Augustin Stable finished as the leading overall breeder of Pennsylvania-bred horses. For 2013 horses bred by his operation earned over $1,804,000. Leading runners of 2013 bred by Strawbridge include Grade 3 winner Kitten's Point and Irish stakes-placed Sir Ector.

Strawbridge is a first cousin to Charlotte C. Weber, the daughter of Ethel M. Dorrance and her husband Tristram Coffin Colket. Weber is also involved in Thoroughbred breeding and racing as the owner of the prominent Live Oak Stud in Ocala, Florida.

== Philanthropy ==
Strawbridge and his former wife support a variety of causes including environmental, medical and cultural institutions. He gave $2 million to create the Margaret Dorrance Strawbridge Foundation Translational Cancer Research Endowment at the Lucille P. Markey Cancer Center in Lexington, Kentucky.

He is also a member of the board of trustees of the Winterthur Museum near Greenville, Delaware.
