= Harpeth Hills Flying Monkey Marathon =

Road race in Nashville, Tennessee, US

The Harpeth Hills Flying Monkey Marathon is a 26.2-mile (42.2 km) road race in Percy Warner Park, the larger of the Warner Parks in Nashville, Tennessee. It was created to be among the top five most difficult road marathons in the United States, and was designed to be somewhat anti-establishment and grassroots in character. In particular, the Harpeth Hills Flying Monkey Marathon is consciously not part of any running series and is neither certified nor sanctioned by the USATF, but is the standard 42.195 kilometres (26.219 mi). A runner cannot use this race to qualify for the Boston Marathon. This marathon was initially dreamt up by a broad array of Middle Tennessee runners and was first described on an internet message board dedicated to Middle Tennessee runners. The original organizers included Trent Rosenbloom, The Nashville Striders, Peter Pressman, Diana Bibeau, and others.

The marathon was inaugurated on November 19, 2006, with 97 runners. In the inaugural running, the first place male runner finished in 2:50:25, and the first place female finisher in 3:11:05. The marathon's second running took place on November 18, 2007 with 174 runners from 29 states, two Canadian provinces, and one from Italy. In 2007, the overall male winner cut 4:50 off the course record by finishing in 2:45:35. In 2008, four runners broke the previous course record, when Ben Schneider set a new 9:10 minute course record by winning with 2:36:25 on a sunny 30–40 degree day. Ben had successes in 2009, 2010, 2011 and 2012 when he returned to defend his title. In 2012, Olympic Trialist Leah Thorvilson became the first woman to break 3 hours on the course. The race is run in Percy Warner Park in Nashville, Tennessee – one of the country's largest public city parks. It is one of the hardest road marathons in the country according to many runners, and has been named the best marathon in Tennessee. In 2019, the race inaugurated the first HALF Monkey distance.

The marathon starting and finishing line is located at 7601 Highway 100 South, Nashville, TN, 37221. Coordinates: (36.066255, −86.900418).

== Origin ==
The marathon's creator asserts that the marathon's name honors a local legend about flying monkeys. According to the legend, the flying monkeys are an endangered cryptid often confused with large owls and hawks. Before 1939, the monkeys were supposedly commonly seen throughout the Southeastern United States, with large populations living in middle Tennessee and Appalachia. The legend states that, following 1939, the flying monkeys were hunted to the point of near-extinction.

== Race history ==
The marathon has taken place annually since 2006. Race themes are documented by annual Hatch show prints, sourced here, and finisher totals with results can be seen here.

Year	Date	Finishers	Theme
2024	November 14	273	The Good, The Bad, and The Monkey
2023	November 19	244	Monkey Mind
2022	November 20	257	Lord of the Monkeys
2021	November 21	236	Goodnight Monkey
2020	November 22	237	Country Monkey
2019	November 24	323	A Series of Unfortunate Miles
2018	November 18	308	Gotta Flee em All
2017	November 19	324	Twelve Monkeys
2016	November 20	308	This is the Year of the Monkey
2015	November 22	324	The Tenth Annual Monkey Games
2014	November 23	298	A Dance with Monkeys
2013	November 24	313	Faster than a Speeding Banana
2012	November 18	285	We've Got Big Hills
2011	November 20	275	Think Monkey
2010	November 21	232	peace, love and hills – monkey groovy
2009	November 22	205	Episode IV: A New Hope
2008	November 23	193	carpe simiam. seize the monkey.
2007	November 18	173	not flat. not fast. not certified. flying monkey attacks. you have got to be bananas.
2006	November 19	97	saving the flying monkeys, one hill at a time

== Results history ==
Year	Top Men			Top Women		
Year	First place	Second place	Third place	First place	Second place	Third place
2024	Jordan William 2:44:02	Christopher Acree 2:54:52	Amir Abtahi 2:57:31	Becca Murray 2:58:24 *	Caroline Kimble 3:17:29	Brooke Wanser 3:32:37
2023	Trevor Uyemura 2:57:04	Sam Wiggins 3:03:27	Jason Loyd 3:07:17	Caroline Kimble 3:05:02	Erica Aikman 3:32:35	Traci Falbo 3:46:03
2022	Tony White 2:49:51	Eric Waterman 2:55:53	Ralston Hartness 3:09:39	Mckenzie Yanek 3:16:27	Caroline Kimble 3:19:08	Sue Anne Perry 3:34:50
2021	Sricharan Kadimi 2:44:54	Jason Lloyd 3:07:04	Eric Waterman 3:10:32	Caroline Kimble 3:25:04	Brooke Kowalski 3:33:00	Casey White 3:33:36
2020	Tony White 2:47:10	Yasuhiro Ukegawa 3:06:07	Kyle Brooks 3:10:14	Meredith Smith 3:40:40	Heather Hudak 3:52:30	Brooke Kowalski 3:53:20
2019	Seki Kazufumi 2:56:11	Hunter Hall 2:57:31	Olaf Wasternack 2:59:02	Elizabeth Canty 3:19:31	Patricia Schaefer 3:39:47	Meredith Smith 3:45:03
2018	Nathan Holland 3:00:34	Brian Wooden 3:09:18	Chuck Engle 3:14:05	Elizabeth Canty 3:16:40	Kris Rehm 3:35:45	Ruth Wilkins 3:36:03
2017	Mick Brown 3:13:59	Eric Waterman 3:15:26	Wilson Meads 3:16:06	Caroline Grunenwald 3:14:18	Meredith Smith 3:34:00	Sarah Heck 3:36:25
2016	Alex Payne 2:50:51	Dustin Dutton 2:57:19	Chuck Engle 3:05:44	Meredith Smith 3:35:04	Andrea Bonaccorsi 3:45:12	Kris Rehm 3:46:37
2015	Scott Wietecha 2:42:17	William Martin 2:43:05	Peter Volgyesi 2:57:31	Traci Falbo 3:18:03	Sara Maltby 3:19:00	Meredith Smith 3:27:26
2014	Gary Krugger 2:44:41	Olaf Wasternack 2:50:20	Scott Bennett 3:00:23	Meredith Smith 3:33:24	Jennifer Chaffin 3:54:33	Julieann Storm 3:54:54
2013	Ben Schneider 2:38:38	Keaton Morgan 2:44:38	Olaf Wasternack 2:48:18	Meredith Smith 3:21:05	Traci Falbo 3:23:47	Elizabeth Reinhart 3:32:46
2012	Ben Schneider 2:34:17 *	Olaf Wasternack 2:45:48	Gary Krugger 2:45:58	Leah Thorvilson 2:59:36 **	Meredith Smith 3:22:38	Traci Falbo 3:24:15
2011	Ben Schneider 2:38:38	Gary Krugger 2:55:51	Feb Boswell 3:00:36	Traci Falbo 3:13:49	Meredith Smith 3:26:51	Candice Schneider 3:31:04
2010	Ben Schneider 2:38:27	Chuck Engle 2:54:43	Josh Hite 2:55:40	Traci Falbo 3:21:20	Catie Caldwell 3:23:50	Meredith Smith 3:26:52
2009	Ben Schneider 2:38:56	Ted Towse 2:50:03	Josh Hite 2:54:12	Samantha Wood 3:17:36	Candice Chappell 3:24:56	Rachel Randall 3:32:23
2008	Ben Schneider 2:36:25 **	Chuck Engle 2:37:25	Jeff Scovill 2:38:39	Wendi Parker-Dial 3:15:31	Carmen Zimeri 3:42:31	Sara Maltby 3:43:17
2007	Chuck Engle 2:45:35 **	Jeff Edmonds 2:58:17	Pete Mueller 2:59:29	Michelle Didion 3:20:13	Emily Ryan 3:39:55	Tanya Savory 3:44:19
2006	Jeff Edmonds 2:50:25 **	Richard Bailey 2:55:54	John Brower 2:56:31	Jessica Southers 3:11:05 *	Wendi Parker-Dial 3:14:17	Erin Barton 3:55:07

Current course record, by gender, denoted by asterisk; prior course record by double asterisk.

== The Warner Parks ==
The Warner Parks, one of eighty parks owned and operated by the Nashville Metropolitan Board of Parks and Recreation, are located in southwest Davidson County in the Harpeth Hills. The Parks comprise a vast rolling woodland in the heart of the Nashville community, and are situated just 9 miles (14 km) from downtown. Surrounded by urban and suburban settings on all sides, the Warner Parks include the adjoined Percy and Edwin Warner Parks, together encompassing nearly 3,000 acres (12 km^{2}) of forests, fields, hills, valleys and wetlands. The Warner Parks together make up one of the largest city parks in the country. While the parks have walking and nature trails, the singular draw for runners is their extensive network of paved running routes.

Snaking through the 2,058 acres (8.33 km^{2}) Percy Warner Park is the 11.2-mile (18.0 km) Main Drive. "The 11.2", as the locals call it, winds its way through the tree-shaded Park, covering over 1,500 feet (460 m) of elevation gain and loss with grades of up to 10–12% at times, with occasional open fields and densely forested glades. The route goes by scenic overlooks of Nashville, various sports and recreation areas, and quiet picnic pavilions. Runners also pass the grounds of the Iroquois Steeplechase, one of the country's oldest grassy horse tracks.
