= Bushranger (American horse) =

American-bred Thoroughbred racehorse

- Sire: Stefan the Great
- Grandsire: The Tetrarch
- Dam: War Path
- Damsire: Man o' War
- Sex: Gelding
- Foaled: 1930
- Country: United States
- Colour: Chestnut
- Breeder: Joseph E. Widener
- Owner: Joseph E. Widener
- Trainer: J. Howard Lewis
- Record: 21: 11-3-1
- Earnings: $20,635

Major wins
- Whitney Gold Trophy Handicap (1935); Broad Hollow Handicap (1935 & 1936); American Grand National (1936); Brook Handicap (1936)

Honours
- United States Racing Hall of Fame (1967)
- Last updated on October 17, 2006

Bushranger (1930–1937) was an American Thoroughbred steeplechase racehorse. Prepared for flat racing, at age two the grandson of Man o' War demonstrated little ability in that venue and as such his owner decided to try him in steeplechase racing. In the hands of future Hall of Fame steeplechase trainer J. Howard Lewis, Bushranger won important races at age five and six including the American Grand National, the most prestigious steeplechase race in the United States.

Bushranger was retired after his six-year-old racing season but the following year he fractured a leg during a schooling exercise at Belmont Park and had to be euthanized.
