= Middleburg Spring Races =

Steeplechase horse race in Middleburg, Virginia

The Middleburg Spring Races are Virginia's oldest steeplechase races. The races are held at Glenwood Park in Middleburg, Virginia on the third Saturday in April.

The Middleburg Spring Races were first organized in 1911 by Daniel Cox Sands. He was a Middleburg sportsman, who for four decades was Master of Fox Hounds of the Middleburg Hunt.

The races were planned primarily to entertain the farmers. Their land had been used to hunt but galloping horse hooves had crushed the farmers’ crops so the races were a way to pacify them. The spring races attracted the public from miles around.

People came with picnic baskets by horseback, in buckboard, spring wagons and buggies. By the next year the National Steeplechase and Hunt Association had sanctioned the Middleburg Race Meet. Steeplechasing continued annually until World War I. After a hiatus during the war years, it resumed in 1921 with the Middleburg Hunt Cup and the Farmers race held on the estates of Sands and his neighbor, William F. Hitt.

By the 1930s it had become a prestigious event drawing thousands of race goers to Glenwood Park racecourse and its newly built timber, brush, hurdle and flat races.

Since 1990 the Middleburg Spring Races have presented a $75,000 graded stakes hurdle contest, Temple Gwathmey, which attracts the best hurdle horses in the country. In addition, the race card includes timber racing, a combined hurdle/timber event.

Other activities during the races include children's stick pony races, hat contests, vendor tents, picnics and tailgates.
