= Ulster Derby =

Flat horse race in Ireland

- Class: Handicap
- Location: Down Royal, County Down; Northern Ireland
- Inaugurated: 1936
- Race type: Flat / Thoroughbred
- Sponsor: BoyleSports
- Website: Down Royal

Race information
- Distance: 1m 4f 150y (2,551m)
- Surface: Turf
- Track: Right-handed
- Qualification: Three-years-old
- Weight: Handicap
- Purse: €75,000 (2020); 1st: €44,250

Ulster Derby
2026
Madbadanddangerous	Pierre Grosse	Bay Of Stars

Previous years
2025
Vorfreude	Winston Junior	Acapulco Bay
2024
Going Remote	Barnso	Tamrat
2023
Tower Of London	Ibrahimovic	Hippodrome
2022
Urban Oasis	Cougar	Manu Et Corde
2021
Iowa	King Of The Castle	Bear Story

2020-2011
2020
Red Kelly	Sunchart	Baby Zeus
2019
Dadoozdart	King's Vow	Future Investment
2018
Change Of Velocity	Sheberghan	Midnight Wilde
2017
Clongowes	Wingingit	Tilly's Chilli
2016
Stellar Mass	Manjaam	Lieutenant General
2015
Botany Bay	Fields Of Athenry	Brightly Shining
2014
Wexford Town	Magnolia Beach	Azurite
2013
Sir Ector	Maggie Dalton	Scatter Dice
2012
Alhellal	Rattan	Royal Diamond
2011
Banksters Bonus	Force Of Habit	Denny Crane

2010-2003
2010
Celtic Dane	Northgate	Fantoche
2009
Changingoftheguard	Drunken Sailor	Adjaliya
2008
Fantoche	Salute Him	Ragged Staff
2007
Temlett	Song of Hiawatha	Mutadarek
2006
Kempes	Callow Lake	Swiss Cottage
2005
Newlands North	Callow Lake	Raggtime Toon
2004
Green Lassy	Cloone River	Theme Song
2003
Blue Corrig	Mr Wong	Aqualina

The Ulster Derby is a flat handicap horse race in Northern Ireland open to three-year-old horses. It is run at Down Royal over a distance of 1 mile 4 furlongs and 150 yards (2,551 metres), and it is scheduled to take place each year in June.

The event was established in 1936, and it was originally restricted to three-year-olds. For a period it was contested over 1 mile, 4 furlongs and 68 yards. It was opened to older horses in 1994, and increased in distance to 1 mile, 4 furlongs and 190 yards (2,588 metres). In 2014 it was restricted to three-year-olds again and reduced to 1 mile and 3 furlongs (2, 213 metres) before being increased to its present distance in 2015.

The Ulster Derby is Northern Ireland's most valuable flat race.

== Records ==
Most successful horse:

- no horse has won this race more than once

Leading jockey since 1962 (4 wins):

- Tommy Murphy – Dumbwaiter (1974), Caucasus (1975), Transworld (1977), Encyclopedia (1978)

Leading trainer since 1962 (7 wins):

- Vincent O'Brien – Onandaga (1969), Tantoul (1971), Dumbwaiter (1974), Caucasus (1975), Transworld (1977), Encyclopedia (1978), Baba Karam (1987)
- Jim Bolger - Nordic Region (1990), Kirov Premiere (1993), Citizen Edward (2001, dd-ht), Wexford Town (2014), Stellar Mass (2016), Clongowes (2017), Change of Velocity (2018)

== Winners since 1988 ==
- Weights given in stones and pounds.

Year	Winner	Age	Weight	Jockey	Trainer	Time
1988	Highland Bud	3	8–11	Ron Quinton	John Oxx
1989	Lone Runner	3	8–11	Raymond Carroll	Dermot Weld
1990	Nordic Region	3	8–11	Willie Supple	Jim Bolger
1991	Dowland	3	8–11	Steve Cauthen	Michael Kauntze
1992	Tijara	3	8-09	Johnny Murtagh	John Oxx
1993	Kirov Premiere	3	9-04	Christy Roche	Jim Bolger
1994	Karikata	3	8-01	D. G. O'Shea	John Oxx
1995	Munif	3	8–10	Michael Kinane	Dermot Weld	2:33.50
1996	I'm Supposin	4	9-09	M. Duffy	Kevin Prendergast
1997	Docklands Limo	4	8-05	David Harrison	Brian McMath	2:33.80
1998	Dragon Triumph	3	8-02	Robbie Fitzpatrick	Jim Gorman	2:35.10
1999	General Cloney	3	8-00	Niall McCullagh	Willie Mullins	2:34.90
2000	Media Puzzle	3	8-09	Pat Smullen	Dermot Weld	2:32.10
2001 (dh)	Citizen Edward; Masilia	4; 4	8-03; 8-07	Seamie Heffernan; Johnny Murtagh	Jim Bolger; John Oxx	2:32.30
2002	Balapour	4	8-01	Tom Queally	Oliver Brady	2:53.30
2003	Blue Corrig	3	7-05	Davy Moran	Joe Crowley	2:35.70
2004	Green Lassy	4	7-05	Padraig Beggy	Ger Lyons	2:45.70
2005	Newlands North	4	7–10	Rory Cleary	Michael O'Brien	2:49.50
2006	Kempes	3	8-08	Pat Smullen	Frances Crowley	2:43.20
2007	Temlett	3	8-01	Chris Hayes	Willie Mullins	2:46.50
2008	Fantoche	6	8-05	Willie Supple	Jessica Harrington	2:50.00
2009	Changingoftheguard	3	8-07	Colm O'Donoghue	Aidan O'Brien	2:45.38
2010	Celtic Dane	6	9-05	Chris Hayes	Kevin Prendergast	2:42.12
2011	Banksters Bonus	3	8-09	Shane Foley	Jessica Harrington	2:48.89
2012	Alhellal	6	8-08	Declan McDonogh	Maurice Phelan	2:52.39
2013	Sir Ector	6	9-03	Chris Hayes	Jimmy Lambe	2:47.41
2014	Wexford Town	3	8-13	Kevin Manning	Jim Bolger	2:19.95
2015	Botany Bay	3	8-04	Niall McCullagh	Charles O'Brien	2:43.47
2016	Stellar Mass	3	9-06	Kevin Manning	Jim Bolger	2:47.09
2017	Clongowes	3	8-10	Ronan Whelan	Jim Bolger	2:44.01
2018	Change Of Velocity	3	9-12	Kevin Manning	Jim Bolger	2:46.67
2019	Dadoozart	3	9-07	Shane Foley	Noel Meade	2:54.90
2020	Red Kelly (Note: The 2020 race was run in July due to the COVID-19 pandemic in Northern Ireland)	3	9-03	Shane B. Kelly	Johnny Murtagh	2:51.85
2021	Iowa	3	8-12	Michael Hussey	Aidan O'Brien	2:47.69
2022	Urban Oasis	3	8-00	Jamie Powell	John James Feane	2:52.32
2023	Tower of London	3	9-05	Killian Hennessy	Aidan O'Brien	2:45.14
2024	Going Remote	3	8-07	Nathan Crosse	Jessica Harrington	2:45.31
2025	Vorfreude	3	8-10	Gary Carroll	Joseph Murphy	2:46.17
2026	Madbadanddangerous	3	8-09	Gavin Ryan	Noel Meade	2:54:28

== Earlier winners ==
- 1936: Black Domino
- 1937: Owenstown
- 1948: Soodani
- 1954: Red Winter
- 1962: Atlantis
- 1963: Christmas Island
- 1964: Netherby
- 1965: Newsrullah
- 1966: My Kuda
- 1967: Dan Kano
- 1968: Stitch
- 1969: Onandaga
- 1970: Dubrava
- 1971: Tantoul
- 1972: Falaise
- 1973: French Fable
- 1974: Dumbwaiter
- 1975: Caucasus
- 1976: Captain Memory
- 1977: Transworld
- 1978: Encyclopedia
- 1979: The Bart
- 1980: Sheringham
- 1981: Dance Bid
- 1982: Affiance
- 1983: Sir Simon
- 1984: Sondrio
- 1985: Rising
- 1986: Don Diege
- 1987: Baba Karam

== See also ==
- Horse racing in Ireland
- List of Irish flat horse races
- Ulster Grand National
