= Grand National Hurdle Stakes =

American Thoroughbred horse race

- Class: Grade I
- Location: Far Hills, New Jersey, United States
- Inaugurated: 1899
- Race type: Thoroughbred - Steeplechase
- Website: Far Hills Race Meeting Association, Inc.

Race information
- Distance: 2 5/8 miles
- Surface: Turf
- Track: Hurdle, 14 fences
- Qualification: Four-year-olds and up
- Weight: Four-year-olds: 148 pounds (67 kg); Older horses: 156 pounds (71 kg)
- Purse: $250,000

The Grand National Hurdle Stakes is an American National Steeplechase Association sanctioned steeplechase race run each fall at Far Hills, New Jersey. It is a Grade 1 event run over 2 5/8 miles. It has been known by a variety of names over the years, including the Breeders' Cup Grand National.

The race dates back to 1899 where it was first run at Morris Park Racecourse. It was long the premier stakes in U.S. jump racing. Past winners include 11 of the 14 steeplechasers inducted into the National Museum of Racing and Hall of Fame: Flatterer (also a close second in the 1987 Champion Hurdle), Zaccio, Café Prince, Bon Nouvel, Neji, Oedipus, Elkridge, Bushranger, Battleship (in 1938 became the only winner of this race and the Aintree Grand National), Jolly Roger and Good and Plenty.

The race has also been held at Belmont Park and Saratoga Race Course as well as the steeplechase meets at Fair Hill, Maryland and Charlottesville, Virginia. While the race has been named the Breeders' Cup Grand National, it was never held as part of the Breeders' Cup.

The Grand National (sometimes called the American Grand National to distinguish it from the race held at Aintree in England) is one of the oldest races in steeplechasing and one of the most important outside Europe. The day of steeplechasing at Far Hills includes seven races, the most important of which is the Grand National.

== Winners of the Grand National since 1998 ==
Year	Winner	Age	Jockey	Trainer	Owner	Time
2026	Western Fold	7	Jack Kennedy	Gordon Elliott	Weld-Spec Ltd & Dee L'Estrange	
2025	Zanahiyr	8	Jack Kennedy	Gordon Elliott	Bective Stud	5:20.00
2024	Snap Decision	10	Graham Watters	Jack Fisher	Bruton Street-US	5:02.86
2023	Noah And The Ark	9	Harrison Beswick	Todd McKenna	Keystone Thoroughbreds	5:41.28
2022	Hewick	7	Jordan Gainford	John Hanlon	TJ McDonald	5:11.60
2021	The Mean Queen	5	Richard Condon	Keri Brion	Buttonwood Farm	4:57.20
2019	Brain Power	8	Nico de Boinville	Nicky Henderson	Michael Buckley	4:55.60
2018	Jury Duty	7	Robbie Power	Gordon Elliott	Sideways Syndicate	5:14.20
2017	Mr. Hot Stuff	11	Danny Mullins	Jack O. Fisher	Mrs. S. K. Johnston Jr.	4:57.40
2016	Rawnaq	9	Ruby Walsh	Cyril Murphy	Irvin S. Naylor	4:50:00
2015	Dawalan	5	Ross Geraghty	Cyril Murphy	Irvin S. Naylor	4:57.20
2014	Demonstrative	7	Robert Walsh	Richard Valentine		5:19.00
2013	Divine Fortune	10	Darren Nagle	Jonathan E. Sheppard		5:15.00
2012	Pierrot Lunaire	8	Bernard Dalton	Blythe Miller Davies		5:40.00
2011	Black Jack Blues	8	Ross Geraghty	Joseph W Delozier III	Irvin S. Naylor	5:29.80
2010	Percussionist	9	James O'Farrell	Iben & Morten Buskop	Morten Buskop	5:00.40
2009	Your Sum Man	7	Ross Geraghty	Thomas H. Voss	Fields Stable	5:39.78
2008	Good Night Shirt	7	William Dowling	Jack Fisher	Harold A. Via Jr.	4:54.20
2007	McDynamo	10	Jody Petty	Sanna Hendriks	Michael J. Moran	5:30.60
2006	McDynamo	9	Jody Petty	Sanna Hendriks	Michael J. Moran	5:58.20
2005	McDynamo	8	Jody Petty	Sanna Hendriks	Michael J. Moran	5:46.65
2004	McDynamo	7	Craig Thornton	Sanna Hendriks	Michael J. Moran	5:06.80
2003	McDynamo	6	Craig Thornton	Sanna Hendriks	Michael J. Moran	5:24.12
2002	Flat Top	9	Robert Massey	Janet Elliot	Nancy Gerry	5:19.44
2001	Quel Senor	6	Cyril Murphy	Thomas H. Voss	Coppertree Farm	4:54.20
2000	All Gong	6	Blythe Miller	Bruce Miller	Calvin Houghland	4:53.90
1999	Ninepins	12	Arch Kingsley Jr.	Jonathan E. Sheppard	Hudson River Farm	5:28.40
1998	Flat Top	5	Bitsy Patterson	Janet Elliot	Nancy Gerry	4:55.60

== Earlier winners ==
- 1997 - Rowdy Irishman
- 1996 - Correggio
- 1995 - Rowdy Irishman
- 1994 - Warm Spell
- 1993 - Runway Romance (American Grand National)
- 1993 - Lonesome Glory (Breeders' Cup Steeplechase)
- 1992 - Highland Bud
- 1991 - Morley Street (English champion)
- 1990 - Morley Street
- 1989 - Highland Bud
- 1988 - Jimmy Lorenzo (US champion)
- 1987 - Gacko (French champion)
- 1986 - Census (multiple graded stakes winner)
