= Forever Together (American horse) =

American-bred Thoroughbred racehorse

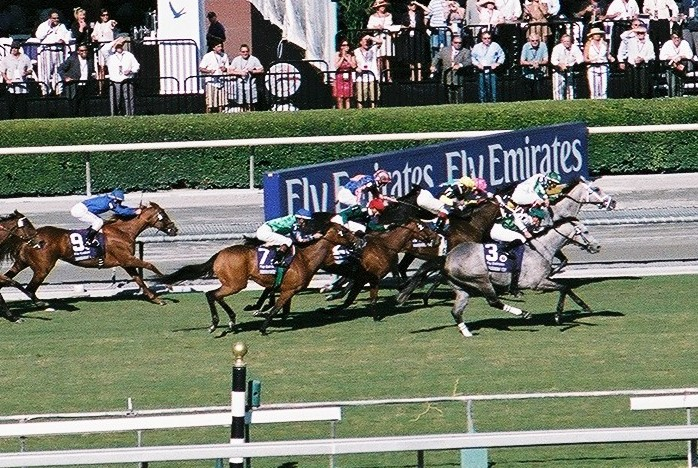
- Forever Together winning the BC F&M Turf
- Sire: Belong To Me
- Grandsire: Danzig
- Dam: Constant Companion
- Damsire: Relaunch
- Sex: Filly
- Foaled: 2004
- Country: United States
- Colour: Gray
- Breeder: White Fox Farm
- Owner: Augustin Stable
- Trainer: Jonathan E. Sheppard
- Record: 20: 9-3-5
- Earnings: US$2,802,639

Major wins
- OBS Filly Sprint Stakes (2007); Forward Gal Stakes (2007); Diana Stakes (2008, 2009); First Lady Stakes (2008); Jenny Wiley Stakes (2009) Breeders' Cup wins: Breeders' Cup Filly & Mare Turf (2008)

Awards
- American Champion Female Turf Horse (2008)

Forever Together (foaled April 12, 2004 in Kentucky) is an American Thoroughbred Champion racehorse. Bred by the White Fox Farm of Karen and Dewey White, she was purchased and raced by George W. Strawbridge Jr.'s Augustin Stable.

Trained by Jonathan Sheppard, Forever Together's wins include back-to-back editions in 2008 and 2009 of the Diana Stakes at Saratoga Race Course. She won the 2008 Breeders' Cup Filly & Mare Turf at Santa Anita Park and was voted American Champion Female Turf Horse honors. In a November 11, 2009 return to Santa Anita Park to defend her Breeders' Cup Filly & Mare Turf title, Forever Together ran third to winner, Midday.
