= Flatterer (horse) =

American-bred Thoroughbred racehorse

- Sire: Mo Bay
- Grandsire: Cyane
- Dam: Horizontal
- Damsire: Nade
- Sex: Gelding
- Foaled: 1979
- Country: United States
- Colour: Dark Bay
- Breeder: Jonathan E. Sheppard and William L. Pape
- Owner: William L. Pape
- Trainer: Jonathan E. Sheppard
- Record: 51: 24-7-5
- Earnings: $538,708

Major wins
- Colonial Cup (1983, 1984, 1985, 1986); Iroquois Steeplechase (1987); Temple Gwathmey Steeplechase(1983,1985); American Grand National (1983); New York Turf Writers Cup (1984)

Awards
- Eclipse Award for Outstanding Steeplechase horse (1983, 1984, 1985, 1986)

Honours
- United States Racing Hall of Fame inductee (1994)

Flatterer (1979–2014) was an American Thoroughbred racehorse. He was a specialist steeplechaser who was the first to win the title of American Champion Steeplechase Horse on a record four occasions. In a racing career which lasted from 1982 through 1988 when he turned 8, he ran fifty-one times and won twenty-four races including many of America's most important steeplechases including the Colonial Cup (four times). Flatterer also became one of the few American-trained horses to compete successfully in the United Kingdom, placing second in the Champion Hurdle in 1987 and also in France, placing second in the French Champion Hurdle1986. Flatterer was the first American steeplechaser to live to the age of 35.

== Background ==
Flatterer, who was foaled June 5, 1979, was a dark bay horse who was bred in Pennsylvania by William L. Pape and Jonathan E. Sheppard. Flatterer was originally intended for a career in flat racing, but was unable to show much potential in this area having eighteen starts only four wins, placing second twice, and third twice. After showing that he was unsuitable for flat racing, Flatterer was given his chance at Steeplechasing. He was trained by Jonathan E. Sheppard and ridden in most of his races by Jerry Fishback, who led him to 9 victories. He was sired by Mo Bay out of the mare Horizontal by Nade, a horse with the pedigree including Nasrullah who shows up in four other champion steeplechasing horses.

== Racing career ==
Flatterer did not begin his racing career until he was a three-year-old in 1982, when he won four flat races from eighteen starts, this is where trainer Jonathan E. Sheppard decided "He simply wasn't quite fast enough to have any sort of breather in flat races, he had to go all out to keep up. We'd eventually lose him in claiming races. I thought jumping races might suit him just fine.". As a four-year-old, Flatterer was switched over to the world of steeplechasing and won six of his ten starts where he earned $93,064. In 1983, he was placed to compete for the Eclipse Award in the Colonial Cup, where he placed first, and continued winning for three more years after that in 1984, 1985, and 1986. In between these four years, Flatterer took his chance in other races. These races included the Temple Gwathmey in 1983 and 1985, Grand National 1983, New York Turf Writers Cup 1984, and placed first in all of these events. Later he was sent overseas to France where he placed second at the French Champion Hurdle in 1986 and later the next year also came in second during the English Champion Hurdle. After these two races trainer Sheppard claimed “That was another remarkable effort. The two best races he ran might have been two of the few races he actually lost. They were superb efforts. On your own ground, doing your own thing against horses you run against at home, running in top-class races is difficult. To do it away from home, on unfamiliar ground and over unfamiliar fences is something special.”

In 1987 at the age of eight, Flatterer competed in his final races. He had started in five, won two of them, came second in one, and also placed third in one. During this final stretch, he earned a total of $79,602. Over his entire steeplechasing career, Flatterer earned a grand total of $538,708 United States Dollars.

== Retirement ==
Flatterer was retired from racing after his final races in 1987, he was 8. He returned to his owner William Pape's farm (My Way Farm) in Unionville, PA where he remained active doing dressage work and spending much of his time with a younger mare named My Tombola. Owner William Pape shares that “The two of them get along extremely well, and these older guys, with the younger women…well, it moves them up and keeps them sound.” In 2014, Flatterer died at the age of 35 becoming one of the longest living thoroughbreds, and author Barbara Livingston from the Daily Racing Form claims that "Thoroughbreds rarely reach the benchmark of 30, let alone 33".

In 1994 Flatterer was elected to the National Museum of Racing and Hall of Fame

== Pedigree ==
Pedigree of Flatterer (USA), Dark Bay or Brown gelding, 1979
Sire Mo Bay (USA) dk b 1969	Cyane br 1959	Turn-To br 1951	Royal Charger ch 1942
Sire Mo Bay (USA) dk b 1969	Cyane br 1959	Turn-To br 1951	Source Sucree br 1940
Sire Mo Bay (USA) dk b 1969	Cyane br 1959	Your Game br 1948	Beau Pere br 1927
Sire Mo Bay (USA) dk b 1969	Cyane br 1959	Your Game br 1948	Winkle II b 1939
Sire Mo Bay (USA) dk b 1969	Rum Bottle Bay b 1959	Thinking Cap b 1952	Rosemont b 1932
Sire Mo Bay (USA) dk b 1969	Rum Bottle Bay b 1959	Thinking Cap b 1952	Carmargo b 1944
Sire Mo Bay (USA) dk b 1969	Rum Bottle Bay b 1959	Sea Snack b 1943	Hard Tack ch 1926
Sire Mo Bay (USA) dk b 1969	Rum Bottle Bay b 1959	Sea Snack b 1943	Miss Ferdinand b 1937
Dam Horizontal (USA) dk b 1970	Nade dk br 1958	Nasrullah b 1940	Nearco (ITY) br 1935
Dam Horizontal (USA) dk b 1970	Nade dk br 1958	Nasrullah b 1940	Mumtaz Begum (FR) b 1932
Dam Horizontal (USA) dk b 1970	Nade dk br 1958	Dentifrice br 1947	Reaping Reward br 1934
Dam Horizontal (USA) dk b 1970	Nade dk br 1958	Dentifrice br 1947	Gino Patty dk b 1938
Dam Horizontal (USA) dk b 1970	Lucie Deedes dk b 1963	Kentucky Pride dk b 1955	Bull Lea br 1935
Dam Horizontal (USA) dk b 1970	Lucie Deedes dk b 1963	Kentucky Pride dk b 1955	Blue Delight br 1938
Dam Horizontal (USA) dk b 1970	Lucie Deedes dk b 1963	Bithynia dk b 1957	Hannibal br 1949
Dam Horizontal (USA) dk b 1970	Lucie Deedes dk b 1963	Bithynia dk b 1957	Widdimere br 1946
