= Lonesome Glory =

American-bred Thoroughbred racehorse

- Sire: Transworld
- Grandsire: Prince John
- Dam: Stronghold
- Damsire: Green Dancer
- Sex: Gelding
- Foaled: 1988
- Country: United States
- Colour: Chestnut
- Breeder: Walter M. Jeffords
- Owner: Kay Jeffords
- Trainer: Bruce Miller; Charlie Brooks
- Record: 42: 23-5-5
- Earnings: US$1,223,669

Major wins
- Sport of Kings Challenge (1992); Breeders' Cup Steeplechase (1993); Colonial Cup (1994, 1995, 1997); Iroquois Steeplechase (1997); Carolina Cup (1997, 1999)

Awards
- Eclipse Award for Outstanding Steeplechase horse (1992, 1993, 1995, 1997, 1999)

Honours
- Lonseome Glory Hurdle Stakes at Belmont Park; United States Racing Hall of Fame inductee (2005)

Lonesome Glory (1988–2002) was an American Thoroughbred racehorse. He was a specialist steeplechaser who won the title of American Champion Steeplechase Horse on a record five occasions. In a racing career which lasted from 1991 through 1999, he ran forty-two times and won twenty-three races including many of America's most important steeplechases including the Breeders' Cup Steeplechase, the Colonial Cup (three times) and the Carolina Cup (twice). Lonesome Glory also became one of the few American-trained horses to compete successfully in the United Kingdom, winning races in 1992 and 1995. Lonesome Glory was the first American steeplechaser to win more than $1 million in prize money.

== Background ==
Lonesome Glory, who was foaled on February 18, 1988, was a tall, rangy chestnut horse with a white blaze. He was bred in Kentucky by Walter M. Jeffords, who died in 1990, leaving his horses to his wife, Kay. Lonesome Glory was originally intended for a career in Show-jumping but proved temperamentally unsuitable and was switched to racing. He was trained by Bruce Miller and ridden in most of his races by Blythe Miller, his trainer's daughter.

He was sired by the Irish St. Leger winner Transworld out of the mare Stronghold, a daughter of Green Dancer, a multiple Group One winner who became a leading sire.

== Racing career ==
Lonesome Glory began his racing career as a three-year-old in 1991, when he won one minor race from four starts. As a four-year-old, he won five of his seven races. In December, he was sent across the Atlantic to contest the Sport of Kings Challenge, a hurdle race over 2 miles 5 1/2 furlongs at Cheltenham Racecourse in England. He was given little chance, starting a 20/1 outsider, but stayed on strongly in the closing stages to win by a head. After the race, Lonesome Glory and his rider were given an enthusiastic reception by British racegoers: Miller explained that "there were a lot of people around clapping and cheering... I was a little bit stunned." The win, which made headlines in the British press, was the first by an American-trained horse in a British National Hunt race. At the end of the year Lonesome Glory was voted America's champion steeplechaser for the first time at the Eclipse Awards.

In 1993, Lonesome Glory won three races and won his second Eclipse Award. On October 16 at Belmont Park, he contested the Breeders' Cup Steeplechase. Ridden by Blythe Miller, he defeated the odds-on favorite Highland Bud, who was partnered by the British Champion jockey Richard Dunwoody. Lonesome Glory's most important win at age six in 1994 came in the Colonial Cup at Camden, South Carolina, in which he defeated Mistico by a head. In the voting for the Eclipse Award, he was beaten by Warm Spell.

Lonesome Glory's most successful season came in 1995, when he won six races. On November 12, he claimed his second Colonial Cup, beating Rowdy Irishman by a length and a half after taking the lead at the last fence. In December, he returned to England for the Crowngap Handicap Chase at Sandown Park Racecourse in which he faced three rivals including the Queen Mother Champion Chase winner Remittance Man. Lonesome Glory took the lead at the last fence and drew clear to win by eleven lengths. His performances earned him $225,7673 and a third Eclipse Award. Lonesome Glory remained in England under the care of Charlie Brooks and was aimed at the Cheltenham Gold Cup at the Cheltenham Festival. He finished fourth in the Peter Marsh Chase at Haydock Park racecourse in January before a muscle injury ended his British campaign. Lonesome Glory raced three times during the remainder of 1996. In April 1997, running on Lasix for the first time, he won the Carolina Cup from Hudson Bay and Prime Legacy. Blythe Miller said after the race that "all I had to do was steer him". In autumn, he added a third Colonial Cup, picking up a $250,000 bonus for winning both races. His successes brought him another championship, equalling the record of four titles set by Flatterer between 1983 and 1986. Lonesome Glory won once from three starts as a ten-year-old. Undefeated in 1999, he won the Carolina Cup for a second time, concluded his career with a win in The Royal Chase at Keeneland, and was voted champion steeplechaser for the fifth time.

== Retirement ==
Lonesome Glory was retired from racing at the end of 1999. He died on his owner's farm on February 25, 2002, after being injured in a paddock accident. He was buried on the grounds of the National Steeplechase Museum at Camden, where a bronze statue was erected in his honor.

In 2005 Lonesome Glory was elected to the National Museum of Racing's Hall of Fame.

== Pedigree ==
Pedigree of Lonesome Glory (USA), chestnut gelding, 1988
Sire Transworld (USA) 1974	Prince John; 1953	Princequillo	Prince Rose*
Sire Transworld (USA) 1974	Prince John; 1953	Princequillo	Cosquilla
Sire Transworld (USA) 1974	Prince John; 1953	Not Afraid	Count Fleet
Sire Transworld (USA) 1974	Prince John; 1953	Not Afraid	Banish Fear*
Sire Transworld (USA) 1974	Hornpipe; 1965	Hornbeam	Hyperion
Sire Transworld (USA) 1974	Hornpipe; 1965	Hornbeam	Thicket
Sire Transworld (USA) 1974	Hornpipe; 1965	Sugar Bun	Mahmoud
Sire Transworld (USA) 1974	Hornpipe; 1965	Sugar Bun	Galatea
Dam Stronghold (FR) 1979	Green Dancer; 1972	Nijinsky	Northern Dancer
Dam Stronghold (FR) 1979	Green Dancer; 1972	Nijinsky	Flaming Page
Dam Stronghold (FR) 1979	Green Dancer; 1972	Green Valley	Val de Loir
Dam Stronghold (FR) 1979	Green Dancer; 1972	Green Valley	Sly Pola
Dam Stronghold (FR) 1979	Serge de Nîmes; 1960	Arctic Prince	Prince Chevalier*
Dam Stronghold (FR) 1979	Serge de Nîmes; 1960	Arctic Prince	Arctic Sun
Dam Stronghold (FR) 1979	Serge de Nîmes; 1960	Blue Denim	Blue Larkspur*
Dam Stronghold (FR) 1979	Serge de Nîmes; 1960	Blue Denim	Judy O'Grady (Family:16-c)

* Lonesome Glory is inbred 4S x 5D to the stallion Prince Rose, meaning that he appears fourth generation on the sire side of his pedigree and fifth generation (via Prince Chevalier) on the dam side of his pedigree.

* Lonesome Glory is inbred 5S x 4D to the stallion Blue Larkspur, meaning that he appears fifth generation (via Banish Fear) on the sire side of his pedigree and fourth generation on the dam side of his pedigree.

== See also ==
- List of racehorses
