= Caucasus (horse) =

American-bred Thoroughbred racehorse

- Sire: Nijinsky
- Grandsire: Northern Dancer
- Dam: Quill
- Damsire: Princequillo
- Sex: Stallion
- Foaled: 14 May 1972
- Country: United States
- Colour: Bay
- Breeder: Cragwood Estates
- Owner: Jane Engelhard; Fred Sahadi; Cardiff Stud Farm
- Trainer: Vincent O'Brien; Charles E. Whittingham
- Record: 22: 9-4-3
- Earnings: $448,633

Major wins
- Ulster Derby (1975); Irish St. Leger (1975); Sunset Handicap (1976); Manhattan Handicap (1976); Arcadia Handicap (1977); San Luis Rey Handicap (1977)

Awards
- Timeform rating 127 (1975)

Caucasus (14 May 1972 – after 1991) was an American-bred Thoroughbred racehorse and sire who won major races on both sides of the Atlantic. As a young horse he was sent to race in Ireland where he won four of his five races as a three-year-old in 1975 including the Ulster Derby and Irish St. Leger. He then returned to America where he had considerable success in the next two years, winning five races including the Sunset Handicap, Manhattan Handicap, Arcadia Handicap and San Luis Rey Handicap. He had some success as a breeding stallion.

== Background ==
Caucasus was a bay horse with a white star and a white sock on his right hind leg bred in Kentucky by his owner Jane Engelhard's Cragwood Estates. He was sent to race in Europe and entered training with Vincent O'Brien at Ballydoyle.

He was from the first crop of foals sired by Nijinsky, a Canadian horse who won the Triple Crown in 1970. During his racing career Nijinsky had been trained by O'Brien and owned by Jane Engelhard's husband Charles (1917–1971). Caucasus's dam Quill was a top-class racehorse who was named American Champion two-year-old filly in 1958 before going on to win the Acorn Stakes and Mother Goose Stakes in the following year. As a broodmare, her other descendants have included Run the Gantlet and Awesome Feather.

== Racing career ==
=== 1975: three-year-old season ===
Caucasus made a successful racecourse debut in a maiden race over ten furlongs at Phoenix Park Racecourse and followed up in a handicap over one and a half miles at the Curragh. In June he was sent to Northern Ireland for the Ulster Derby at Down Royal and won his third consecutive start. In August he was sent to England for the March Stakes (a trial for the St Leger Stakes) over fourteen furlongs at Goodwood Racecourse. He started odds-on favourite but after being retrained towards the rear of the field he failed to overhaul Whip It Quick and finished second, beaten half a length by the winner.

On 20 September Caucasus equipped with blinkers when he was moved up in class for the Group 1 Irish St. Leger over fourteen furlongs at the Curragh. Ridden by Lester Piggott he started the 3/1 second favourite behind Nuthatch (winner of the Nijinsky Stakes) while the other eleven runners included Shantallah (Chester Vase), Music Ville (fourth in the Irish Oaks), Sir Daniel and Quiet Fling. Caucasus took the lead soon after the start and maintained his advantage into the straight where Quiet Fling emerged as his only serious challenger. Quiet Fling went to the front approaching the final furlong but Caucasus rallied to regain the lead and drew away in the closing stages to win by two lengths.

At the end of the season the independent Timeform organisation gave Caucasus a rating of 127, making him ten pounds inferior to their Horse of the Year Grundy.

=== 1976: four-year-old season ===
Before the start of the 1976 season Caucasus was sold and returned to the United States to be trained by Charles E. Whittingham. He was mainly campaigned in California, with six of his eight races taking place at Hollywood Park Racetrack. In May he was beaten in two allowance races but then won the South Bay Handicap and finished second to Dahlia in the Grade I Hollywood Invitational Handicap. He returned to the track in July to finish third to King Pellinore the Grade I American Handicap and then won the Grade I Sunset Handicap, reversing the form with King Pellinore. After a two-month break he was shipped to the East coast for two races at Belmont Park. He won the Grade II Manhattan Handicap but then ran unplaced in the Man o' War Stakes

The New York Times described Caucasus as "Hollywood Park's best grass horse in 1976".

=== 1977: five-year-old season ===
Caucasus showed his best form of 1977 at Santa Anita Park in March when he followed up a win in the Grade III Arcadia Handicap with a victory in the Grade I San Luis Rey Handicap eleven days later. He failed to win again that year but posted some solid efforts in defeat, finishing second in the Hollywood Invitational and third in both the San Juan Capistrano Handicap and the Hollywood Gold Cup.

== Stud record ==
At the end of his racing career Caucasus was retired to become a breeding stallion at Windfields Farm in Maryland. The best of his offspring were probably the fillies Videogenic winner of the 1986 Santa Ana Handicap and Lake Country who was named Canadian Champion Older Female Horse in 1985.

== Pedigree ==
Pedigree of Caucasus (USA), bay stallion, 1972
Sire Nijinsky (CAN) 1967	Northern Dancer (CAN); 1961	Nearctic	Nearco
Sire Nijinsky (CAN) 1967	Northern Dancer (CAN); 1961	Nearctic	Lady Angela
Sire Nijinsky (CAN) 1967	Northern Dancer (CAN); 1961	Natalma	Native Dancer
Sire Nijinsky (CAN) 1967	Northern Dancer (CAN); 1961	Natalma	Almahmoud
Sire Nijinsky (CAN) 1967	Flaming Page (CAN); 1959	Bull Page	Bull Lea
Sire Nijinsky (CAN) 1967	Flaming Page (CAN); 1959	Bull Page	Our Page
Sire Nijinsky (CAN) 1967	Flaming Page (CAN); 1959	Flaring Top	Menow
Sire Nijinsky (CAN) 1967	Flaming Page (CAN); 1959	Flaring Top	Flaming Top
Dam Quill (USA) 1956	Princequillo (IRE); 1940	Prince Rose	Rose Prince
Dam Quill (USA) 1956	Princequillo (IRE); 1940	Prince Rose	Indolence
Dam Quill (USA) 1956	Princequillo (IRE); 1940	Cosquilla	Papyrus
Dam Quill (USA) 1956	Princequillo (IRE); 1940	Cosquilla	Quick Thought
Dam Quill (USA) 1956	Quick Touch (USA); 1946	Count Fleet	Reigh Count
Dam Quill (USA) 1956	Quick Touch (USA); 1946	Count Fleet	Quickly
Dam Quill (USA) 1956	Quick Touch (USA); 1946	Alms	St. Brideaux
Dam Quill (USA) 1956	Quick Touch (USA); 1946	Alms	Bonus (Family:5-g)
