= McDynamo =

American Thoroughbred racehorse

- Sire: Dynaformer
- Grandsire: Roberto
- Dam: Rondonia
- Damsire: Monteverdi
- Sex: Gelding
- Foaled: 1997
- Country: United States
- Colour: Bay
- Breeder: Richard and Nathan Fox / Richard Kaster
- Owner: Michael Moran
- Trainer: Sanna Hendriks
- Record: 34: 17-6-1
- Earnings: $1,354,994

Major wins
- Hard Scuffle Hurdle (2002); Supreme Hurdle Stakes (2002); Royal Chase for the Sport Of Kings Hurdle (2003); Breeders' Cup Grand National Steeplechase (2003, 2004, 2005, 2006, 2007); Colonial Cup (2003, 2005, 2006); Somerset Medical Center Race for Cancer Awareness Hurdle Stakes (2006)

Awards
- Eclipse Award for Outstanding Steeplechase horse (2003, 2005, 2006)

Honours
- United States Racing Hall of Fame inductee (2013)

McDynamo (April 6, 1997 - December 1, 2019) was an American Thoroughbred racehorse. He was a five-time winner of the Grade 1 Breeders' Cup Grand National Steeplechase at the Far Hills Races and a three-time honoree with the Eclipse Award for Outstanding Steeplechase horse. McDynamo was sired by Dynaformer.

== Background ==
Foaled April 6, 1997, McDynamo was a son of Dynaformer, who sired 25 Grade 1 winners, including Kentucky Derby winner Barbaro. His dam was Rondonia, a daughter of Irish champion Monteverdi. Rondonia also produced Old Chapel, a graded stakes-winning full-brother to McDynamo, and Radonezh (by Barkersville), a graded stakes winner in Russia.

McDynamo was bred in Kentucky by Richard Fox, Nathan Fox, and Richard Kaster. He was later bought by Michael Moran for $82,000 at the Keeneland yearling sale in September 1998.

== Racing career ==
As a three-year-old, McDynamo came in seventh at the Pimlico Race Course in May 2000 in his debut race. He won his next start at Pimlico at 1 1/2 miles (2.4 km), but had just two more starts before being sidelined for a year after surgery to remove a hind ankle chip. He won only one of five races as a four-year-old. After unsuccessful efforts at Saratoga Race Course (ridden by Pat Day) and Belmont Park, Moran turned McDynamo to Sanna Hendriks, who specializes in training steeplechasers. McDynamo won his first jump race by 4 1/4 lengths at Far Hills Races on October 20, 2001.

A crowd estimated at 45,000 at the 2004 running of the Grade 1 $175,000 Breeders' Cup Grand National Steeplechase saw McDynamo, then a 7-year-old gelding in his first race in 11 months after recovering from hock surgery, win the race for a second consecutive year, defeating Hirapour by 1 1/2 lengths in a finishing time of 5:06.8. The race covered a 2 5/8-mile (4.2 km) distance, with jumps over 14 fences.

The 2007 running saw McDynamo running for a fifth consecutive title, one of nine horses running for the Grade 1 Breeders' Cup Grand National, with a purse of $300,000. At the age of 10, McDynamo was the oldest of 43 horses competing at Far Hills that day. All starters in the race carried 156 pounds.

McDynamo was named Eclipse Award for Outstanding Steeplechase horse in 2003, 2005 and 2006. He was an Eclipse Award finalist every year from 2002 to 2007, and won at least one Grade 1 steeplechase race in each of those seasons. He was retired from racing at the end of 2007.

== Honors ==
Along with his numerous Eclipse honors and nominations, McDynamo was inducted into the National Museum of Racing & Hall of Fame in Saratoga Springs, NY in 2013.

McDynamo holds the current U.S. Steeplechase record for earnings with $1,310,104.

== Retirement and death ==
McDynamo lived out retirement at trainer Sanna Neilson's farm in Pennsylvania. He competed in fox hunting in retirement and made many "celebrity" appearances at Fair Hill. McDynamo was a friendly horse and made friends with many animals on the farm, including a pony named Ted.

McDynamo was humanely euthanized on December 1, 2019, at the age of 22; he had been suffering from arthritis and general infirmities of old age. “Nothing in particular happened,” Neilsen said. “He had one stifle that bothered him, and it was just arthritic and whatever and there was nothing to do to it. It got harder to keep weight on him, he never did well in the wintertime. He looked a little unsteady behind to me and he wasn’t going to get any better. He was happy and comfortable and everything. I was nervous with the weather coming in – he’d have a hard time on frozen ground – and it felt like the right thing to do.” He was buried on the farm.
