= William C. Lickle =

American banker and steeplechase owner (1929–2021)

William Cauffiel Lickle (August 2, 1929 – August 19, 2021) was an American banker and steeplechase owner.

== Early life and education ==
William Cauffiel Lickle was born in Wilmington, Delaware on August 2, 1929. He studied at the University of Virginia and graduated in 1951 BA, and 1953 JJD.

== Banking ==
Lickle was chairman and CEO of Laird Bissell & Meeds (NYSE), the Delaware Trust Company and Chairman of J.P. Morgan International Holdings Corporation. He was also a Director of Dean Witter and President of Lickle Publishing. In 1988, he was appointed by President Ronald Reagan to the President's Export Council. He was a member of the American, Virginia and Supreme Court bars

== Steeplechase owner ==
As a steeplechase owner, Lickle was (upon his retirement in 2005) the second Leading National Steeplechase Association (NSA) owner in history in terms of prize money with $3,151,921 in winnings. He was a three-time leading annual National Steeplechase Association owner, in 1991, 1992 and 1997. His silks and trophies can be found in the National Museum of Racing and Hall of Fame in Saratoga, New York and in the Steeplechase Hall of Fame in Camden, South Carolina.

== Death ==
Lickle died at his home in Greenville, Delaware, on August 19, 2021, at the age of 92.

== Recognition ==
- Eclipse Award, 1996, Correggio
- Second Leading National Steeplechase Association (NSA) owner in history, $3,151,921
- Three-time leading annual NSA owner: 1991, 1992, 1997
- Three-time Iroquois winners: 1991, 1992, 1997
- Two-time Colonial Cup winners: 1990, 1996

== Champion horses ==
- Victorian Hill (all-time leading Steeplechase horse in earnings of $748,370; four course records
- Correggio (Eclipse Award winner); earnings of $258,880
- Hudson Bay (Saratoga track record); earnings of $232,685
- Master McGraw (Smithwick, Temple, Gwathmey Carolina Cup; earnings of $331,355)
- Trebizond (Triple Crown: Keeneland, Belmont, with Pimlico cancelled; earnings $223,088)
- Green highlander (Novice champion; Saratoga flat track record; earnings of $270,393)
- Young Dubliner (National Timber Champion; Maryland Hunt Cup and Penn Hunt Cup winner)
- Where's Pepo (National Timber Champion)
- Sinatra (Queen Elizabeth II Challenge Cup and Grade I Test Stake; earnings of $378,606)
- Tide (Budweiser Breeder's Cup; earnings of $234,006)
