= Far Hills Races =

Steeplechase horse race

Far Hills Race Meeting
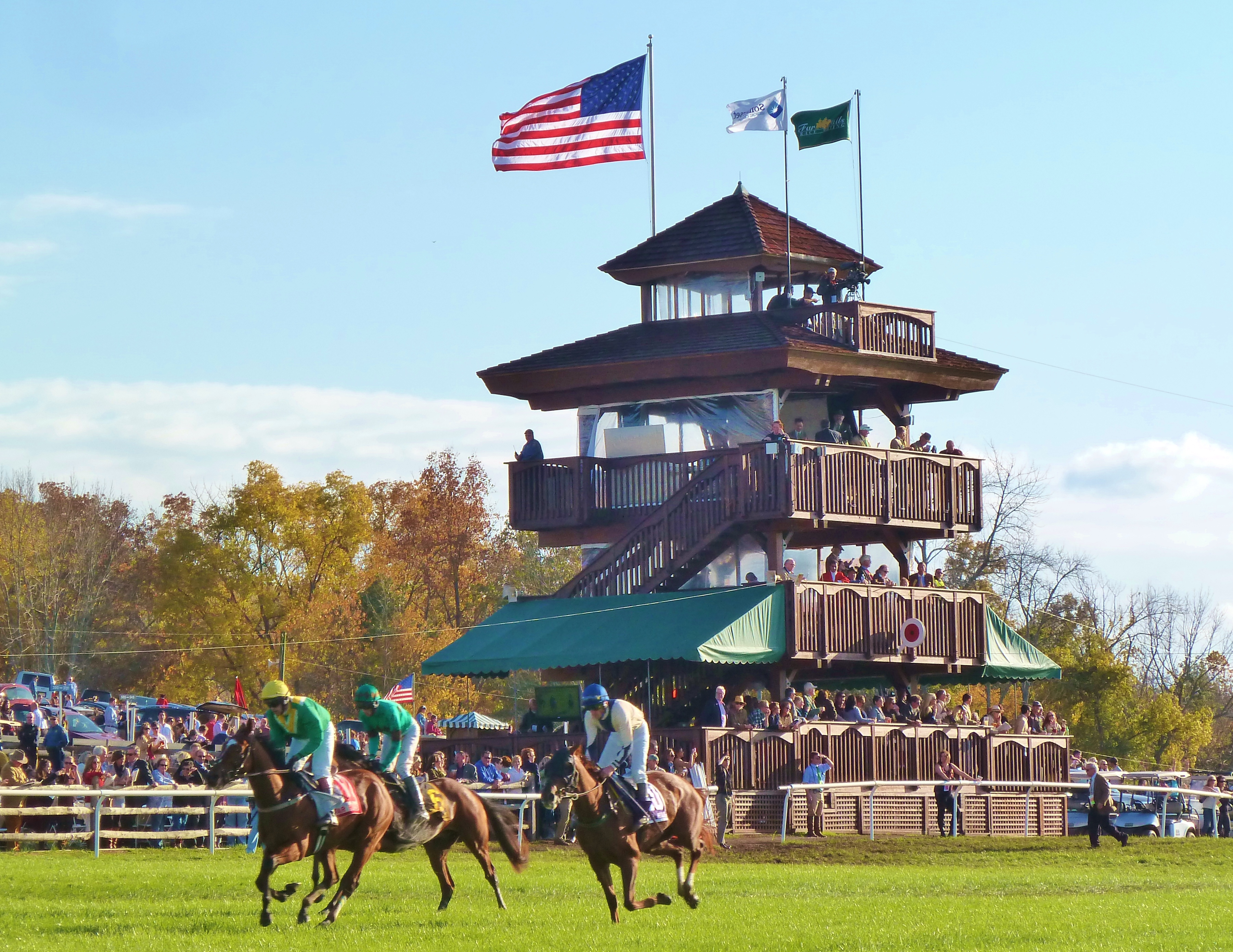
- Status: Active
- Genre: Steeplechase racing
- Date: October (annual)
- Frequency: Annual
- Venue: Moorland Farm
- Locations: Far Hills, New Jersey, United States
- Coordinates: 40.691631°N 74.628454°W
- Inaugurated: 1915
- Attendance: Tens of thousands (recent years)
- Organizer: Far Hills Race Meeting Association
- Website: farhillsrace.org

The Far Hills Race Meeting is an annual steeplechase horse racing event held the third Saturday each October at Moorland Farm in Far Hills, New Jersey, United States. Organized by the Far Hills Race Meeting Association, the event is part of the National Steeplechase Association circuit.

The meeting features multiple stakes races, including the historic and prestigious Grade 1 American Grand National, and combines competitive racing with charitable fundraising. The event has grown into a major regional sporting and social gathering, drawing tens of thousands of spectators annually.

== History ==
The origins of the Far Hills Race Meeting trace back to the Essex Hunt, which organized steeplechase races in New Jersey in the late 19th century. In 1915, the races were relocated to Moorland Farm in Far Hills, where the event has remained.

The first official Far Hills Race Meeting was held in 1915. Over the following decades, the event became a fixture of the American steeplechase calendar, attracting horses, trainers, and jockeys from across the sport. The races were suspended during World War II and again in 2020 due to the COVID-19 pandemic.

A significant development came in 2018 with the introduction of pari-mutuel wagering, bringing the event in line with other major horse racing venues in the United States.

== Racing program ==
The Far Hills Race Meeting features a full day of steeplechase racing, typically consisting of multiple stakes races over hurdles and timber courses. The centerpiece of the meeting is the Grade 1 American Grand National, one of the most prominent steeplechase races in the United States.

Other races on the card include stakes events, hurdle races, and races for novice and maiden horses. In recent years, races such as the McDynamo Maiden Sweepstakes have been included as part of the meeting's race card.

== Course and layout ==
The Far Hills Race Meeting is held at Moorland Farm, a grass racecourse in Far Hills, New Jersey. The course is set within open countryside and is configured for steeplechase racing, including hurdle and timber events.

Races are run over varying distances depending on the division and race type. Hurdle races are contested over portable fences, while timber races are run over fixed wooden fences, consistent with traditional American steeplechase racing formats.

The venue includes spectator areas, tailgating sections, reserved enclosures, and hospitality spaces, allowing the race meeting to function as both a competitive sporting event and a large outdoor gathering.

== Event and attendance ==
Beyond racing, the Far Hills Race Meeting is known for its social and cultural significance in the region. The event attracts horse racing enthusiasts, local residents, and visitors from across the northeastern United States.

Spectators traditionally gather in tailgate areas, reserved enclosures, and hospitality sections, contributing to the event's reputation as both a sporting competition and a social gathering.

Attendance has varied over time, but recent editions of the race meeting have drawn tens of thousands of spectators.

== Charity and impact ==
The Far Hills Race Meeting is a charitable event, with proceeds supporting healthcare and community organizations in the region. According to the organizers, the event has contributed more than $22 million to local beneficiaries, including hospitals and emergency services organizations.

The event has also contributed to the local economy through tourism, hospitality, and regional business activity associated with race day.

== Notable winners ==
Notable winners of the Grade 1 American Grand National, the featured race of the Far Hills Race Meeting, include:

Year	Horse	Notes	Source
2025	Zanahiyr (IRE)	Irish-bred jumper; winner of the American Grand National at Far Hills	
2024	Snap Decision	Winner of the Grade 1 American Grand National at the 103rd running	
2022	Hewick	Irish-trained winner of the American Grand National	

== Recent runnings ==
- 2024 (103rd running): Held October 19; approximately $700,000 in purses; Snap Decision won the American Grand National.
- 2025 (104th running): Held October 18; approximately $775,000 in purses; Zanahiyr (IRE) won the American Grand National.
- 2026 (105th running): Scheduled for October 17.
