= National Steeplechase Association =

Official sanctioning body of American steeplechase horse racing

The National Steeplechase Association is the official sanctioning body of American steeplechase horse racing.

The National Steeplechase Association was founded on February 15, 1895 by August Belmont Jr., the first president of The Jockey Club and chairman of the New York State Racing Commission, along with Alexander Cassatt, John G. Follansbee, H. DeCourcy Forbes, Frederick Gebhard, James O. Green, Samuel S. Howland, Foxhall P. Keene, and Frederick H. Prince.

The governing authority for the sport of steeplechase racing, their National Steeplechase Association held, promoted, and documented steeplechase races and events throughout the United States and granted licenses to its various participants. The organization continues to this day with headquarters in Fair Hill, Maryland. The current president is Guy J. Torsilieri. (also Chairman of the Far Hills Race Meeting).

One of the leading steeplechasers, William C. Lickle, has his silks and trophies in the National Museum of Racing and Hall of Fame in Saratoga, NY. In terms of his prize winnings, $3,151,921, and a three time leading annual National Steeplechase Association owner in 1991, 1992, and 1997, William C. Lickle is the second leading National Steeplechase Association owner.
