= Steeplechase (horse racing) =

Horse race featuring jumps over obstacles

Steeplechasing
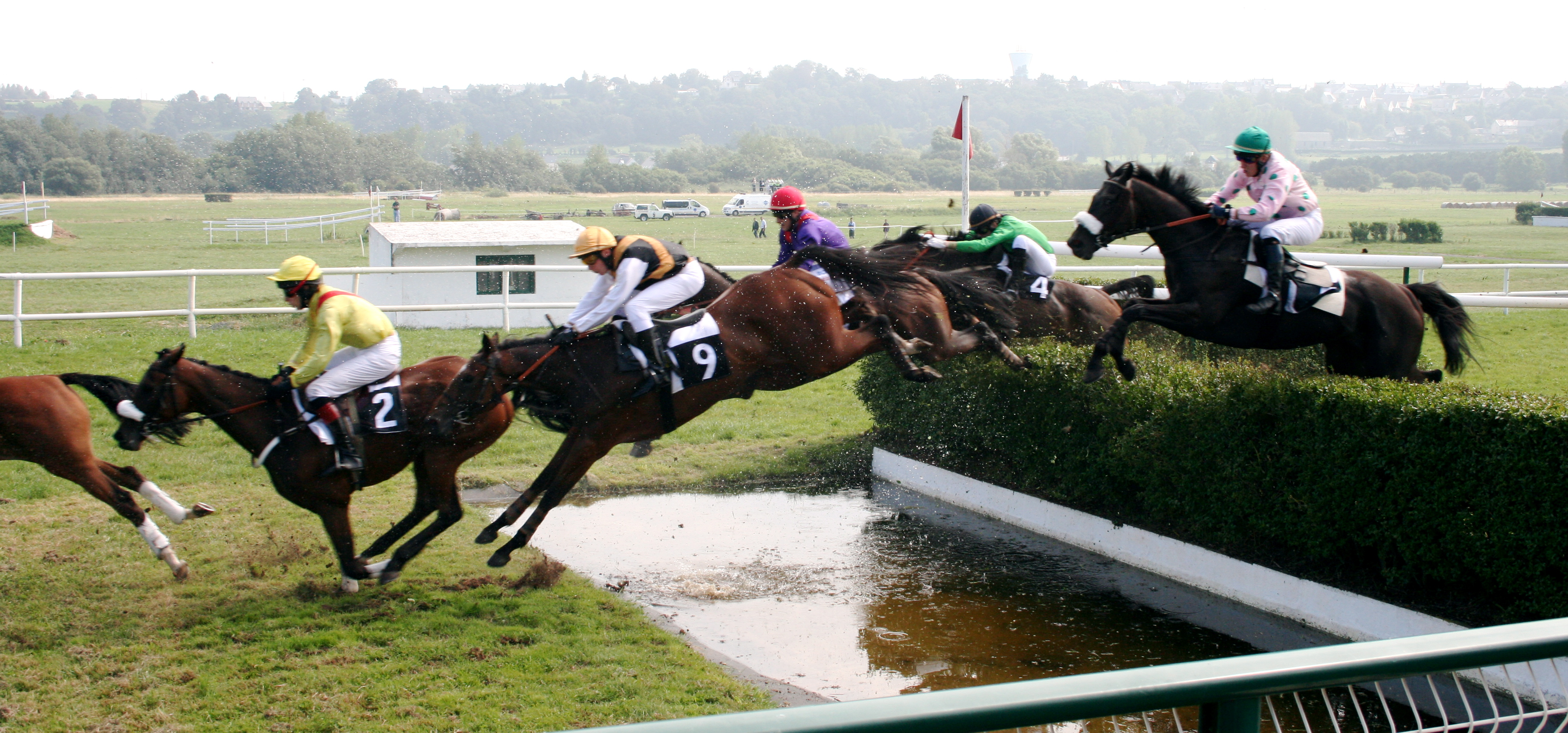
- A steeplechase race
- Highest governing body: Usually governed by assorted national organizations

Characteristics
- Contact: No
- Team members: Individual
- Mixed-sex: Yes
- Type: Outdoor
- Equipment: Horse
- Venue: Turf racecourse with obstacles

Presence
- Country or region: Predominantly Great Britain, Ireland, France, North America, Australia

A steeplechase is a distance horse race in which competitors are required to jump diverse fence and ditch obstacles. Steeplechasing is primarily conducted in Ireland (where it originated), Great Britain, Canada, United States, Australia, and France. The name is derived from early races in which orientation of the course was by reference to a church steeple, jumping fences and ditches and generally traversing the many intervening obstacles in the countryside.

Modern usage of the term "steeplechase" differs between countries. In Ireland and Great Britain, it refers only to races run over large, fixed obstacles, in contrast to "hurdle" races where the obstacles are much smaller. The collective term "jump racing" or "National Hunt racing" is used when referring to steeplechases and hurdle races collectively (although, properly speaking, National Hunt racing also includes some flat races). Elsewhere in the world, "steeplechase" is used to refer to any race that involves jumping obstacles.

The most famous steeplechase in the world is the Grand National run annually at Aintree Racecourse, in Liverpool, since its inception in 1836 (the official race was held three years later), which in 2014 offered a prize fund of £1 million.

== History ==
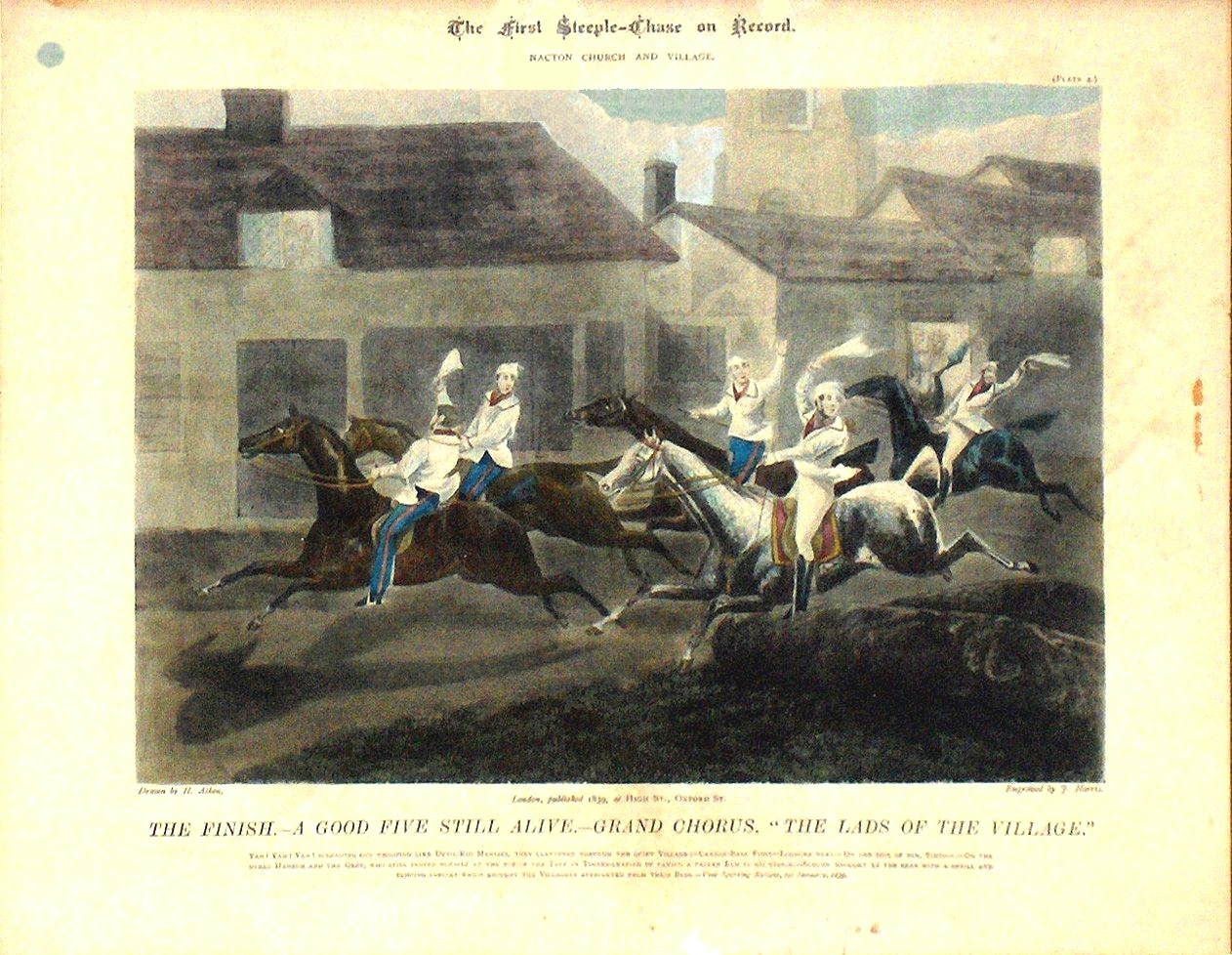
"The lads from the village" - the first recorded English steeplechase 1830

The steeplechase originated in Ireland in the 18th century as an analogue to cross-country thoroughbred horse races which went from church steeple to church steeple, hence "steeplechase". The first steeplechase is said to have been the result of a wager in 1752 between Cornelius O'Callaghan and Edmund Blake, racing four miles (6.4 km) cross-country from St John's Church in Buttevant to St Mary's Church (Church of Ireland) in Doneraile, in County Cork, Ireland. An account of the race was believed to have been in the library of the O'Briens of Dromoland Castle. Most of the earlier steeplechases were contested cross-country rather than on a track, and resembled English cross country as it exists today. The first recorded steeplechase over a prepared track with fences was run at Bedford in 1810, although a race had been run at Newmarket in 1794 over a mile (1600 m) with five-foot (1.5 m) bars every quarter mile (400 m). and the first recorded steeplechase of any kind in England took place in Leicestershire in 1792, when three horses raced the eight miles from Barkby Holt to Billesdon Coplow and back.

The first recorded hurdle race took place at Durdham Down near Bristol in 1821. There were 5 hurdles on the mile long course, and the race was run in three heats.

The first recognised English National Steeplechase took place on Monday 8 March 1830. The 4-mile (6.4 km) race, organised by Thomas Coleman of St Albans, was run from Bury Orchard, Harlington in Bedfordshire to the Obelisk in Wrest Park, Bedfordshire. The winner was Captain Macdowall on "The Wonder", owned by Lord Ranelagh, who won in a time of 16 minutes 25 seconds. Report of the event appeared in the May and July editions of Sporting Magazine in 1830.

== Steeplechasing by country ==
=== Great Britain and Ireland ===
In Great Britain and Ireland, "steeplechase" only refers to one branch of jump racing.

Collectively, Great Britain and Ireland account for over 50% of all jump races worldwide, carding 4,800 races over fences in 2008. Jump racing in Great Britain and Ireland is officially known as National Hunt racing.

=== France ===
French jump racing is similar to British and Irish National Hunt races, with a few notable differences. Hurdles are not collapsible, being more akin to small brush fences. Chases often have large fences called bullfinches, a large hedge up to 8 ft (2.4 m) tall that horses have to jump through rather than over. There are also a larger number of cross-country chases where horses have to jump up and down banks, gallop through water, jump over stone walls as well as jump normal chasing fences.

Unlike in most countries where nearly all of the horses used for jump racing are thoroughbreds, many of the horses in French jump racing are AQPS (Autre Que Pur Sang), a breed of horse now known as "French Chasers" developed in France crossing thoroughbreds with saddle horses and other local breeds. These horses have competed and won the Grand National, the Cheltenham Gold Cup and the Pardubice.

Auteuil in Paris is the best known racecourse in France for French jump racing, with the biggest jumps, along with Pau. The Grand Steeple Grade I race is held at Auteuil in June.

=== Czech Republic ===
The Velká pardubická Steeplechase in Pardubice in the Czech Republic is the location of one of the longest steeplechase races in Europe. The first Velka Pardubice Steeplechase was held on 5 November 1874 and it has been hosted annually since.

=== United States ===
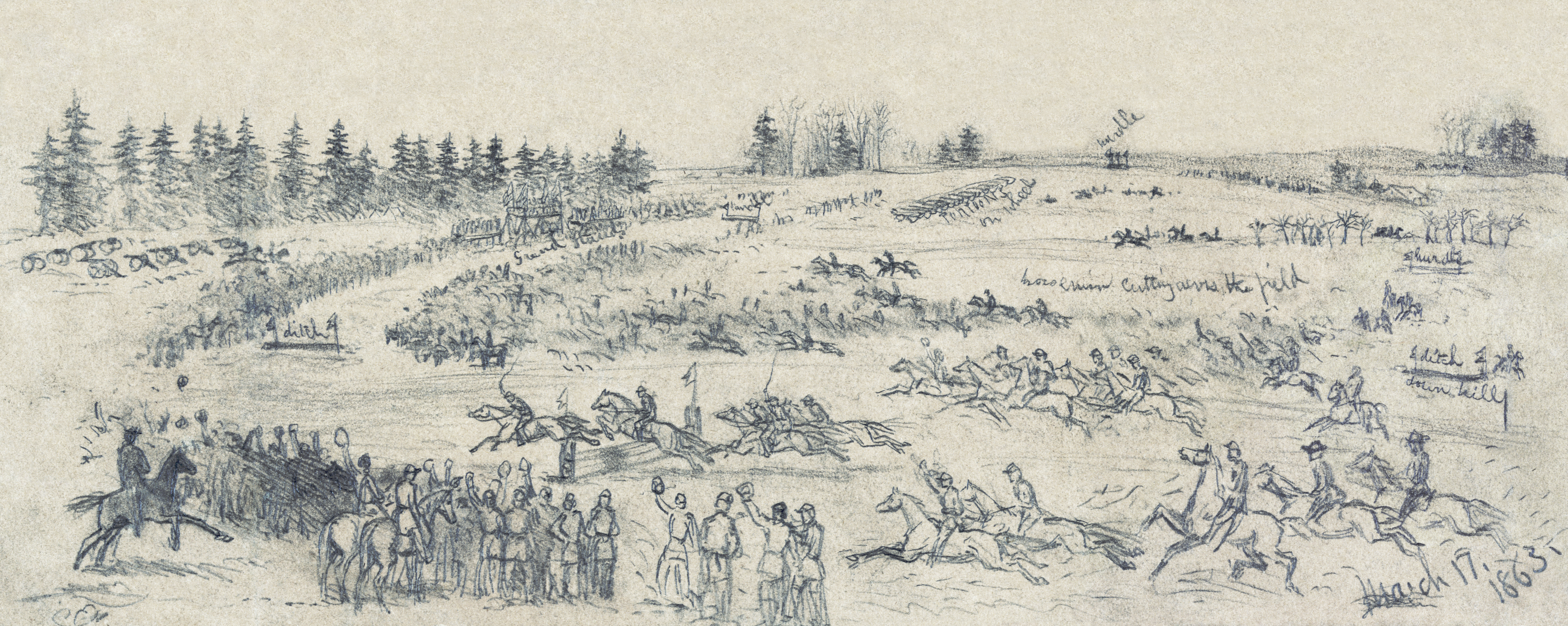
Saint Patrick's Day celebration in the Army of the Potomac. Depicts a steeplechase race among the Irish Brigade, 17 March 1863, by Edwin Forbes. Digitally restored.

In the United States, there are two forms of steeplechasing (or jumps racing): hurdle and timber.

Hurdle races occur almost always over the National fences, standardized plastic and steel fences that are 52 inches tall, with traditional natural fences of packed pine (Springdale Race Course in Camden, South Carolina) and live hedges (Montpelier, Virginia) in use on a few courses. National fences stand 52 inches tall at the highest point, but are mostly made of synthetic "brush" that can be brushed through (much like the synthetic fences now used in other countries). The hurdle horse is trained to jump in as much of a regular stride as possible. This allows the horse to maintain its speed upon landing. Since it is not always possible to meet a fence in stride, the horses are also schooled in how to jump out of stride. An out-of-stride jump can decrease a horse's speed drastically. Hurdle races are commonly run at distances of 2–3 miles (3–5 km). Hurdle races occur at steeplechase meets mainly in the Mid-Atlantic and Southeast and on the turf courses of several racetracks – Saratoga, Colonial Downs, Penn National, Monmouth Park and others.

Timber racing is conducted over solid and immovable wooden rail fences that, in the most extreme case, may reach five feet (1.5 m) high. The distances are longer, ranging from three to four miles (6 km), and the jumping effort required of the horse is much different. Because of the size of the fences and their solid and unyielding construction, a timber horse is trained to jump with an arc, unlike a hurdle racer. An important factor in success at timber racing is for the horse to land in stride, so that it can carry its speed forward on the flat part of the race course. This is harder than in hurdle races because the nature of the obstacle being jumped. If a horse hits a timber fence hard enough, it can bring it almost to a complete stop. Most notable US timber races include the Maryland Hunt Cup in Glyndon, Middleburg Spring Races in Middleburg and the Virginia Gold Cup in The Plains. Timber races currently are not held at any major US tracks (since the fences are not portable) but can be found at almost all steeplechase meets.

American jump racing happens in 11 states: Georgia, South Carolina, North Carolina, Tennessee, Kentucky, Virginia, Maryland, Pennsylvania, Delaware, New Jersey and New York. The National Steeplechase Association is the official sanctioning body of American jump racing. Steeplechase Times newspaper covers the sport.

Thomas Hitchcock (1860–1941) is known as the father of American steeplechasing. In the late 1800s, he built a steeplechase training center on his 3,000-acre (12 km^{2}) property in Aiken, South Carolina and trained horses imported from England. No less important are the contributions by fellow Aiken seasonal resident F. Ambrose Clark. Clark held many important chases on his Brookville (Long Island) estate, Broad Hollow, in the 1920s and 1930s. Ford Conger Field was built by F. Ambrose Clark and is the site of the annual Aiken Steeplechase, a part of the Triple Crown in March. The first Steeplechase Meet in Aiken was held March 14, 1930 in Hitchcock Woods. In addition to the Aiken Steeplechase, South Carolina is also home to the Colonial Cup and the Carolina Cup, which is the largest event on the circuit. Both of these races are held in Camden, South Carolina.

The Virginia Gold Cup is also among the oldest steeplechase races in the United States, with its first running in 1922. Up until recently, the Gold Cup was a four-mile (6 km) long hurdle race. The length of this race prompted many jokes - such as the jockeys putting marbles in their mouth and spitting one out each lap to keep track of what lap they had completed. Since the Gold Cup moved to the present course, it has been changed into a timber race with a very large purse. Every first Saturday in May, more than 50,000 spectators gather at Great Meadow near The Plains, Virginia (45 miles (72 km) west of Washington, DC). The 4-mile (6.4 km) grass course with 4-foot (1.2 m) high timber fences is often referred to as the "crown jewel of steeplechasing".

Tennessee State Historian Walter T. Durham's book Grasslands relates the history of the Southern Grasslands Hunt and Racing Foundation, a group that organized the first international steeplechase held on U.S. soil 80 years ago at Grassland Downs, a 24-square-mile (62 km^{2}) course located in Gallatin, TN between 1929 and 1932.

In addition to holding an inaugural race in 1930, two international steeplechases were held at Grasslands in 1930 and 1931. The winners were awarded a gold trophy designed by King Alfonso XIII of Spain.

The Iroquois Steeplechase event is held in Nashville, Tennessee. Beginning in 1941, with one year off during World War II, the race has been run continuously at Percy Warner Park on a course inspired by Marcellus Frost and designed by William duPont.

The Queens Cup Steeplechase is held annually on the last Saturday of April at Brooklandwood, a farm and estate in Mineral Springs, North Carolina, about 20 miles (32 km) from Charlotte.

The Breeders' Cup Grand National Steeplechase (formerly known as the American Grand National) is held each October at the Far Hills Races in Far Hills, New Jersey and draws about 50,000 spectators for a single day race-meet. It is the richest event in American steeplechasing with a purse of $500,000.

During the 1940s and 50s, the Broad Hollow Steeplechase Handicap, the Brook National Steeplechase Handicap and the American Grand National were regarded as American steeplechasing's Triple Crown.

Kentucky Downs near Franklin, Kentucky (originally Dueling Grounds Race Course) was built in 1990 as a steeplechase track, with a kidney-shaped turf circuit. At its inception, the track offered some of the richest purses in the history of American steeplechase including a $750,000 race. The track has undergone numerous ownership changes, with steeplechase races playing an on-and-off role (mainly off) in the track's limited live race meets.

The Stoneybrook Steeplechase was initiated in Southern Pines, North Carolina on a private farm owned by Michael G. Walsh in 1949 and was held annually in the spring until 1996, with attendance near 20,000. It resumed as an annual spring event at the new Carolina Horse Park in 2001, but was discontinued after 2016.

The New York Turf Writers Cup is held each year at Saratoga Race Course, attracting the best steeplechasing horses in the U.S.

=== Australia ===
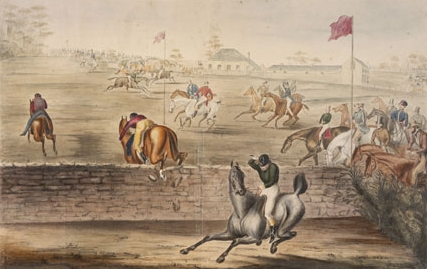
A steeplechase at Five Dock, NSW.

Australia has a long history of jumps racing which was introduced by British settlers. In the late 20th century, the eastern states of Queensland and New South Wales shut down jumps racing, while Tasmania ceased jumps racing in April 2007 due to economic unfeasibility and a lack of entries.

The jumping season in Australia normally takes place from March until September. (some minor races are held either side of these months). Horses used for steeplechasing are primarily former flat racing horses, rather than horses specifically bred for jumping.

There is an emphasis on safety in Australia which has led to a reduction in the size of obstacles. As jumps races take place at flat racing meetings there is also a need for portable jumps. Most chasing occurs on steeple lanes but also includes parts of the main flat racing track. From Easter to May the major distance races occur: The Great Eastern Steeplechase is held on Easter Monday at Oakbank, South Australia drawing crowds of over 100,000, and the Grand Annual, which has the most fences of any steeplechase in the world, is held in May at Warrnambool, Victoria

From the late 1800s to the 1930s the McGowan Family of Brooklyn Park South Australia, were leaders in steeplechase and hurdle racing events. Jack McGowan winning the ARC Grand National, the Oakbank Hurdle, the VRC Cup Hurdle and the Harry D Young Hurdle while his son John McGowan won a record 22 hurdle / steeplechase events in one season.

Each state holds its own Grand National race: the most prestigious is the VRC Grand National at Flemington run in the winter. The jumping season culminates with the set-weights-and-penalties Hiskens Steeple run at Moonee Valley. The Hiskens is regarded as the Cox Plate of jumps racing.

The most famous Australian horse in the field was Crisp, who was narrowly beaten by the champion Red Rum in the 1973 English Grand National. Crisp subsequently beat Red Rum at set weights.

Jumps racing was set to end in Victoria after the 2010 season. In September 2010, having satisfied a limit on the maximum number of deaths among starting horses, hurdle racing was granted a 3-year extension by Racing Victoria. A decision regarding steeplechase was postponed until October 2010 when a program for the 2011 season only was granted. Since 2012, both hurdle races and steeplechases have been approved by Racing Victoria.

=== Japan ===
The Nakayama Racecourse is Japan's premier steeplechase racetrack. The two most prestigious races are the Nakayama Daishogai (first held in 1934) and the Nakayama Grand Jump (held since 1999). Both races have prize money of about 140 million yen, similar to Aintree's Grand National.

The Kyoto Racecourse, the Hanshin Racecourse, the Tokyo Racecourse and the Kokura Racecourse also host graded steeplechase races.

The most famous Japanese horse in the field was Oju Chosan, who has won Nakayama Grand Jump six times (including five consecutive times), and Nakayama Daishogai three times.

== Statistics ==
Number of jumping races by country in 2008.

- Great Britain : 3,366
- France : 2,194
- Ireland : 1,434
- United States of America : 200
- Australia : 146
- Japan : 132
- New Zealand : 129
- Germany : 58

== Opposition to jumps racing ==
=== Australia ===
In 2021, jumps racing in Australia was only run in Victoria and South Australia, though, contrary to common belief, only New South Wales had banned it. All six states and Australian Capital Territory have some history of jumps racing and the states that stopped conducting jumps racings were based on economic decisions. The NSW government officially shut down jumps racing in 1997 after a bill was put through linked with bird tethering, but by that stage there had not been regular jumps race meetings in NSW since World War II, when it was ceased due to the war efforts, except for a handful of exhibition events on an annual basis in the 1980s.

On October 1, 2021 it was announced that jumps racing will no longer be conducted in South Australia mainly due to the small number of South Australian jumps horses. There were plans to run the Great Eastern and Von Doussa Steeplechase as a flat race. However on 3rd March 2022 it was announced that would not happen. However, many jumps racing supporters attempted to keep jumps racing at Oakbank and that fight went into the South Australian court system. That resulted in an election in which the anti-jumps faction won, but debate surrounding that vote spilled into more legal action. Soon after, the South Australian government outlawed jumps racing in the state.

Jumps racing is opposed in Australia by groups including the animal rights organisations the RSPCA Australia, Animals Australia, and Animal Liberation (South Australia), and by political parties such as The Greens.

== Eventing ==
The equestrian sport of eventing had a steeplechase phase, which was held in its CCI 3 Day event format. This phase is called cross country phase B when in the context of eventing. There was a roads and tracks phase, a steeplechase phase, a second, faster roads and track phase and finally the cross country jumps course. Now only the cross country jumps course remains (changes were due to space required for the additional courses and logistics). Unlike the racing form, which is far closer to the sport of hunting, the horses do not race each other over the course, but rather are required to come within a pre-set "optimum time period". Penalty points are added to the competitor's score if they exceed or come in well under the optimum time. While phase B obstacles are similar to those found on actual steeplechase courses, the cross country obstacles for phase D are usually extremely varied, some being topped with brush as in steeplechasing, others being solid, others are into and out of water and others are over ditches. There are often combinations of several fences to test the horse's agility. The variety in obstacles is used to make the horse demonstrate agility, power, intelligence, and bravery. The long format was phased out at the FEI level between 2003 and 2008, but several countries continue to run long format events at the national level, including the US, Great Britain, and Canada.

== See also ==
- American Grand National
- Bayadère (French trotting race mare)
- Breeders' Cup Grand National Steeplechase
- Cheltenham Festival
- Cheltenham Gold Cup
- Grand National
- Grand Pardubice Steeplechase (Velká pardubická)
- Henry Alken, well-known painter of steeplechases
- List of horse races
- National Hunt Chase Challenge Cup
- National Hunt racing
- Point-to-point (steeplechase)
- Thoroughbred racing in New Zealand
- Gran Premio Merano, Italy's most prestigious steeplechase.

== Bibliography ==
- Barrett, Norman, ed. (1995). The Daily Telegraph Chronicle of Horse Racing. Enfield, Middlesex: Guinness Publishing.
