= Search For A Song =

Irish Thoroughbred racehorse

- Racing silks of Moyglare Stud
- Sire: Galileo
- Grandsire: Sadler's Wells
- Dam: Polished Gem
- Damsire: Danehill
- Sex: Filly
- Foaled: 30 March 2016
- Country: Ireland
- Colour: Chestnut
- Breeder: Moyglare Stud
- Owner: Moyglare Stud
- Trainer: Dermot Weld
- Record: 10: 4-2-1
- Earnings: £659,352

Major wins
- Galtres Stakes (2019); Irish St Leger (2019, 2020); Loughbrown Stakes (2021)

Search For A Song (foaled 30 March 2016) is an Irish Thoroughbred racehorse best known for her performances over extended distances. After being unraced as a juvenile she won on her racecourse debut in 2019 and finished fourth in the Irish Oaks before going on to win the Galtres Stakes and the Irish St Leger. In 2020 she won a second Irish St Leger as well as finishing second in the British Champions Long Distance Cup and third in the Tattersalls Gold Cup.

== Background ==
Search For A Song is a chestnut mare with a broad white blaze and white socks on her hind legs bred and owned by the Moyglare Stud. She was sent into training with Dermot Weld at the Curragh, County Kildare.

She was from the fourteenth crop of foals sire by Galileo, who won the Derby, Irish Derby and King George VI and Queen Elizabeth Stakes in 2001. His other progeny include Australia, Frankel, Waldgeist, Nathaniel, New Approach, Rip Van Winkle, Found, Minding and Ruler of the World. Search For A Song's dam, Polished Gem won one minor race from five attempts, but has been a very successful broodmare, producing several other winners including Free Eagle, Sapphire (British Champions Fillies and Mares Stakes) and Custom Cut (Sandown Mile). Polished Gem is a daughter of the Irish 1,000 Guineas winner Trusted Partner.

== Racing career ==
=== 2019: three-year-old season ===
On 30 May Search For A Song made her racecourse debut in a maiden race over ten furlongs on good to firm ground at Fairyhouse Racecourse in which she was ridden by Chris Hayes and started the 4/6 favourite in a six-runner field. After racing prominently from the start she went to the front in the last quarter mile and pulled away to win "comfortably" by four lengths from Lady Olenna.

At Naas Racecourse on 26 June Search For A Song was stepped up in class and went off the 2/1 favourite for the Listed Naas Oaks Trial. She led for most of the race but was overtaken inside the last quarter mile and finished second, two and three quarter lengths behind the Jessica Harrington-trained Trethias. On 20 July the filly was moved to the highest level to contest the Group 1 Irish Oaks over one and a half miles at the Curragh. After racing in mid-division she stayed on well in the closing stages without ever looking likely to win and came home fourth behind Star Catcher, Fleeting and Pink Dogwood. For her next start Search For A Song was sent to England and started 2/1 favourite for the Listed Galtres Stakes at York Racecourse on 22 August. Ridden by Oisin Murphy she raced in third place before taking the lead in the straight and stayed on well to win by one and three quarter lengths and a head from Vivionn and Spirit of Appin. Dermot Weld commented "She did that very nicely. Oisin did a nice job getting her in behind the speed and she's a nice staying filly. I was quite relaxed throughout the race... I really see her coming into her own as a four-year-old."

On 15 September Search For A Song was ridden by Hayes took on nine older male opponents in the Irish St Leger at the Curragh and started at odds of 10/1. Cross Counter went off favourite while the other contenders included Kew Gardens, Latrobe and Capri. After pulling against Hayes' attempts to restrain her the filly took the lead at half way and kept on well in the straight to win by two and a half lengths from Kew Gardens. After the race Weld said "Search For A Song was running so freely early on that it was either going to work out brilliantly or be a disaster. Chris made the right call and it was a very brave one and a hard one to make... When she got to the front the filly settled and we knew she would stay, there's a lot of stamina in her pedigree. The world could be her oyster next year."

=== 2020: four-year-old season ===
The flat racing season in Britain and Ireland was restructured as a result of the COVID-19 pandemic and Search For A Song made her first appearance in the ten and a half furlong Mooresbridge Stakes which was run behind closed doors at the Curragh on 12 June. Ridden by the apprentice jockey Oisin Orr she took the lead three furlongs from the finish but faded badly in the last quarter mile and finished sixth of the nine runners behind the four-year-old gelding Leo De Fury. Worse was to follow in the Munster Oaks at Cork Racecourse on 5 July when the filly (equipped with a hood for the first time) lost her footing and "stumbled badly" after two furlongs before being pulled up by Orr soon afterwards. Later that month she started a 50/1 outsider for the Group 1 Tattersalls Gold Cup and produced a much better performance, staying on strongly from the rear of the field to take third place behind Magical and Sir Dragonet.

On 13 September Search For A Song, with Orr in the saddle, attempted to repeat her 2019 success in the Irish St Leger and went off the 7/1 fifth choice in the betting behind Sovereign, Fujaira Prince (Ebor Handicap), Twilight Payment and Passion (Stanerra Stakes). She was restrained towards the rear of the eight-runner field before moving up into third place behind Fujaira Prince and Twilight Payment approaching the last quarter mile. She gained the advantage 150 yards from the finish and pulled away in the closing stages to win by two lengths. Weld commented "I've trained her for the day for a long time. I had wanted to get that Group 1 form into Search For A Song over a mile and a quarter in case people thought she was only a staying mare. You saw what Magical, who beat her in the Tattersalls Gold Cup, did (in the Irish Champion Stakes), so I was quietly confident she'd win today." Oisin Orr said "The filly settled well today and everything went smooth. I had to make a bit of room for myself, but she picked up well when I got the gap."

Oisin Murphy took the ride when Search For A Song ended her season in the British Champions Long Distance Cup over two miles at Ascot Racecourse on 17 October. Starting the 7/1 second favourite she stayed on well from the rear of the field to take second place, without ever looking likely to challenge the emphatic winner Trueshan.

== Pedigree ==
Pedigree of Search For A Song (IRE), chestnut filly, 2016
Sire Galileo (IRE) 1998	Sadler's Wells (USA); 1981	Northern Dancer (CAN)	Nearctic
Sire Galileo (IRE) 1998	Sadler's Wells (USA); 1981	Northern Dancer (CAN)	Natalma (USA)
Sire Galileo (IRE) 1998	Sadler's Wells (USA); 1981	Fairy Bridge	Bold Reason
Sire Galileo (IRE) 1998	Sadler's Wells (USA); 1981	Fairy Bridge	Special
Sire Galileo (IRE) 1998	Urban Sea (USA); 1989	Miswaki	Mr. Prospector
Sire Galileo (IRE) 1998	Urban Sea (USA); 1989	Miswaki	Hopespringseternal
Sire Galileo (IRE) 1998	Urban Sea (USA); 1989	Allegretta (GB)	Lombard (GER)
Sire Galileo (IRE) 1998	Urban Sea (USA); 1989	Allegretta (GB)	Anatevka (GER)
Dam Polished Gem (IRE) 2003	Danehill (USA); 1986	Danzig	Northern Dancer (CAN)
Dam Polished Gem (IRE) 2003	Danehill (USA); 1986	Danzig	Pas De Nom
Dam Polished Gem (IRE) 2003	Danehill (USA); 1986	Razyana	His Majesty
Dam Polished Gem (IRE) 2003	Danehill (USA); 1986	Razyana	Spring Adieu (CAN)
Dam Polished Gem (IRE) 2003	Trusted Partner (USA); 1985	Affirmed	Exclusive Native
Dam Polished Gem (IRE) 2003	Trusted Partner (USA); 1985	Affirmed	Wont Tell You
Dam Polished Gem (IRE) 2003	Trusted Partner (USA); 1985	Talking Picture	Speak John
Dam Polished Gem (IRE) 2003	Trusted Partner (USA); 1985	Talking Picture	Poster Girl (Family: 9-f)

- Search For A Song is inbred 3 × 4 to Northern Dancer, meaning that this stallion appears once in the third generation and once in the fourth generation of her pedigree.
