= Twilight Payment =

Irish Thoroughbred racehorse

- Racing silks of Twilight Payment
- Sire: Teofilo
- Grandsire: Galileo
- Dam: Dream On Buddy
- Damsire: Oasis Dream
- Sex: Gelding
- Foaled: 6 May 2013
- Country: Ireland
- Colour: Bay
- Breeder: Jim Bolger
- Owner: Godolphin; Jackie Bolger; Lloyd Williams
- Trainer: Jim Bolger; Joseph Patrick O'Brien
- Record: 35: 9-10-8
- Earnings: £2,831,748

Major wins
- Loughbrown Stakes (2016); Her Majesty's Plate (2018); Saval Beg Stakes (2019); Curragh Cup (2019, 2020); Vintage Crop Stakes (2020); Melbourne Cup (2020); Irish St Leger Trial Stakes (2021)

Twilight Payment (foaled 6 May 2013) is an Irish Thoroughbred racehorse best known for winning the 2020 Melbourne Cup. Bred and originally trained by Jim Bolger he did not race until he was three years old but showed promising form over extended distances as he won two races including the Listed Loughbrown Stakes in his first season. He ran consistently as a four-year-old without winning a race and was gelded at the end of the year, but in 2018 he took his second Listed prize as he won Her Majesty's Plate. In 2019 he won the Saval Beg Stakes and the Curragh Cup before moving to the stable of Joseph Patrick O'Brien. As a seven-year-old in 2020 he took the Vintage Crop Stakes and a second Curragh Cup before being sent to Australia and winning the Melbourne Cup on 3 November and produced a new career peak Timeform rating of 121.

== Background ==
Twilight Payment is a bay horse with a white star and a white sock on his left foreleg bred in Ireland by the trainer Jim Bolger. He entered training with Bolger at Coolcullen, County Carlow and was ridden in most of his early races by Bolger's son-in-law Kevin Manning. The horse initially raced in the colours of Godolphin.

He was from the fifth crop of foals sired by the Teofilo the undefeated European Champion Two-Year-Old of 2006. Teofilo's other European offspring have included Cross Counter, Trading Leather, Pleascach and Parish Hall: he has also had great success in Australia where his major winners have included Happy Clapper, Humidor and Kermadec. Twilight Payment's dam Dream On Buddy showed modest racing ability, winning two minor races from eleven starts. She was a half-sister to the Ribblesdale Stakes winner Banimpire and a great-granddaughter of the Prix de l'Arc de Triomphe winner Detroit.

== Racing career ==
=== 2016 & 2017: early career ===
Twilight Payment did not race until he was three years old and began his track career by running fourth in a maiden race over thirteen furlongs at Navan Racecourse on 15 May 2016. After finishing second in a similar event at the same track thirteen days later he was stepped up in class and took third place in the Listed Queen's Vase over two miles at Royal Ascot. At the Curragh on 16 July he started the 4/6 favourite for a one and a half mile maiden and recorded his first success as he led from the start and prevailed by a length from Ex Patriot. He then ran second to Order of St George in the Irish St Leger Trial before ending his first season in the Listed Loughbrown Stakes at the Curragh on 25 September when he produced a strong late run to win by half a length from the favourite Forgotten Rules.

Twilight Payment failed to win as a four-year-old in 2017, but ran well in several major staying events. He finished third to Torcedor in the Vintage Crop Stakes at Navan in April, second to Order of St George in the Saval Beg Stakes at Leopardstown Racecourse in May, second to The Tartan Spartan when favourite for Her Majesty's Plate at Down Royal in July and third to Order of St George in the Irish St Leger Trial at the Curragh in August. At the end of the season he was gelded.

=== 2018: five-year-old season ===
In 2018 Twilight Payment ran second to Order of St George in the Saval Beg Stakes and then finished third behind Flag of Honour in the Curragh Cup. On 27 July he started favourite for Her Majesty's Plate over fourteen furlongs on Good to Firm ground at Down Royal and recorded his first victory in 20 months as he won "comfortably" by three and a half lengths from Law of Spin after taking the lead approaching the last quarter mile. He went on to run second to Flag of Honour in the Irish St Leger Trial and fourth behind the same horse in the Irish St Leger. In his two subsequent starts he finished second to Cypress Creek when favourite for the Loughbrown Stakes and third to Sir Erec in the Listed Martin Molony Stakes at Limerick Racecourse on 13 October.

In November the gelding was consigned to the Goffs Horses In Training sale and was bought for €200,000 by the bloodstock agents Kerr & Co Ltd.

=== 2019: six-year-old season ===
In the early part of 2019 Twilight Payment raced in the colours of Jackie Bolger, his trainer's wife. He began the season in April when he finished second in a minor event at Gowran Park and then ran fourth to Master of Reality in the Vintage Crop Stakes at Navan. In the Saval Beg Stakes over fourteen furlongs on 17 May he started at odds of 6/1 and won from Falcon Eight and Capri, staying on well after taking the lead approaching the final furlong. The gelding followed up in the Curragh Cup over the same distance on 28 June, leading from the start and fighting off the sustained challenge of the 2018 Irish Derby winner Latrobe to prevail by a neck. The winning jockey, Kevin Manning: "Believe it or not his homework has been unbelievable since he won at Leopardstown. He has been stepping forward all year. His form has been rock-solid all through his career and he has improved a little bit this season... He only just does what he has to do but he's a real grinder and loves getting into a battle."

Twilight Payment was then acquired by the Australian businessman Lloyd Williams and transferred to the stable of Joseph Patrick O'Brien at Owning Hill, County Kilkenny. On his first start for his new connections he ran seventh to Search For A Song in the Irish St Leger and was then shipped to Australia for the Melbourne Cup. Ridden by Hugh Bowman he started a 40/1 outsider and finished eleventh, but was beaten less than four lengths by the winner Vow And Declare.

=== 2020: seven-year-old season ===
Twilight Payment began his next campaign with a trip to Saudi Arabia where he finished seventh behind Call The Wind in the Longines Turf Handicap at Riyadh on 29 February. On his return to Europe he ran second to the four-year-old Nickajack Cave in the Saval Beg Stakes and then started 15/8 favourite for the Vintage Crop Stakes over fourteen furlongs at the Curragh on 27 June. Ridden by Wayne Lordan he led from the start and drew away in the final furlong to win by two and a half lengths from Barbados, with Sovereign, Falcon Eight and Master of Reality finishing behind. On 18 July he repeated his 2019 success in the Curragh Cup, starting odds on favourite and winning "easily" by eight lengths from Master of Reality after taking the lead three furlongs from the finish. Joseph O'Brien said "I think it was a big performance... this fella stayed going all the way to the line". In the Irish St Leger on 13 September he kept on well in the closing stages but was beaten into third place by Search For A Song and Fujaira Prince.

He was then shipped to Australia again to contest his second Melbourne Cup and started at odds of 25/1 for the race over 3200 metres at Flemington Racecourse on 3 November. Carrying 55.5 kg and ridden by Jye McNeil he led from the start, opened up a clear lead, and repelled several late challengers to win by half a length from Tiger Moth (trained by Joseph O'Brien's father Aidan) The British-trained Prince of Arran (twice previously placed in the race) was a head away in third with fourth place going to New Zealand's The Chosen One. He was the first to win after leading all the way since Might And Power in 1997 and the oldest winner of the Cup since Catalogue in 1938. Jye McNeil commented "It's been a lifelong dream to get this moment and to get this winner is very surreal. I had to be positive. He was a little bit slow into gear. He jumped with them but he was a touch slow to really find his rhythm. I encouraged him to go forward and that was the plan and then he found just a lovely tempo. He got into a fantastic rhythm, breathing really well and then it was a matter of amping the tempo up at the right stage". Joseph O'Brien said "The horse has got incredible heart. Jye gave him a fantastic ride and he has a huge will to win and he just kept on fighting all the way to the line".

== Pedigree ==
Pedigree of Twilight Payment (IRE), bay gelding, 2013
Sire Teofilo (IRE) 2004	Galileo (IRE); 1998	Sadler's Wells (USA)	Northern Dancer (CAN)
Sire Teofilo (IRE) 2004	Galileo (IRE); 1998	Sadler's Wells (USA)	Fairy Bridge
Sire Teofilo (IRE) 2004	Galileo (IRE); 1998	Urban Sea (USA)	Miswaki
Sire Teofilo (IRE) 2004	Galileo (IRE); 1998	Urban Sea (USA)	Allegretta (GB)
Sire Teofilo (IRE) 2004	Speirbhean (IRE); 1998	Danehill (USA)	Danzig
Sire Teofilo (IRE) 2004	Speirbhean (IRE); 1998	Danehill (USA)	Razyana
Sire Teofilo (IRE) 2004	Speirbhean (IRE); 1998	Saviour (USA)	Majestic Light
Sire Teofilo (IRE) 2004	Speirbhean (IRE); 1998	Saviour (USA)	Victorian Queen (CAN)
Dam Dream On Buddy (IRE) 2007	Oasis Dream (GB); 2000	Green Desert (USA)	Danzig
Dam Dream On Buddy (IRE) 2007	Oasis Dream (GB); 2000	Green Desert (USA)	Foreign Courier
Dam Dream On Buddy (IRE) 2007	Oasis Dream (GB); 2000	Hope (IRE)	Dancing Brave (USA)
Dam Dream On Buddy (IRE) 2007	Oasis Dream (GB); 2000	Hope (IRE)	Bahamian
Dam Dream On Buddy (IRE) 2007	My Renee (USA); 2000	Kris S	Roberto
Dam Dream On Buddy (IRE) 2007	My Renee (USA); 2000	Kris S	Sharp Queen
Dam Dream On Buddy (IRE) 2007	My Renee (USA); 2000	Mayenne	Nureyev
Dam Dream On Buddy (IRE) 2007	My Renee (USA); 2000	Mayenne	Detroit (Family: 16-c)

- Twilight Payment was inbred 4 × 4 to Danzig, meaning that this stallion appears twice in the fourth generation of his pedigree..

== See also ==
- List of Melbourne Cup winners
