= Haefner =

Haefner is a surname. Notable people with the surname include:

- Eva Maria Bucher-Haefner (born 1956/1957), Swiss billionaire heiress
- Martin Haefner (born 1953/1954), Swiss former billionaire heir
- Marsha Haefner (born July 8, 1951), American politician
- Mickey Haefner (1912–1995), American baseball player
- Walter Haefner (1910–2012), Swiss businessman and a thoroughbred racehorse owner and breeder
