= His Majesty's Plate =

Flat horse race in Ireland

Her Majesty's Plate
2026
Carmers	Layfayette	Tennessee Stud

Previous years
2025
Goodie Two Shoes	La Isla Mujeres	Dallas Star
2024
Countess Of Tyrone	Esquiline	Party Central
2023
Powerful Aggie	Taipan	La Hacienda
2022
Perotan	Moon Daisy	Manu Et Corde
2021
Master Of Reality	Federica Sophia	Springbank

2020-2011
2020
Master Of Reality	Barbados	Rakan
2019
Downdraft	The King	Giuseppe Garibaldi
2018
Twilight Payment	Laws Of Spin	On The Go Again
2017
The Tartan Spartan	Twilight Payment	Grandee
2016
Stellar Mass	Benkei	Charming Kitten
2015
Order Of St George	Chapter Seven	Shamar
2014
Manalapan	El Salvador	Sir Ector
2013
Dabadiyan	Shu Lewis	Sir Ector
2012
Chicago	Amira's Prince	Shu Lewis
2011
Northgate	End Of The Affair	Zaralabad

2010-2001
2010
Fictional Account	Knight Eagle	Troas
2009
Trojan War	Hunting Tower	Dabirana
2008
Mourad	Teacht An Earraig	Ballyhaunis
2007
Consulate	Temlett	Prince Erik
2006
Zanderi	Maralan	Navaho Indian
2005
Masafi	Swiss Cottage	Dashing Home
2004
Coat of Honour	Lord Admiral	Seeking Bellissimo
2003
Mobasher	Englishtown	Kiteflyer
2002
Mkuzi	Maumee	Fearn Royal
2001
Last Theatre	Northern Rock	Okey Dorey

2000-1996
2000
Pillar Rock	Veronica Cooper	Mudaa-Eb
1999
Hadeb	Franchetti	Go For Grace
1998
Beldarian	Gordi	Yankee Dancer
1997
Tanzania	China Tealeaf	Ivy Leaf
1996
Rescue Time	Vitus	Narrow Focus

His Majesty's Plate is a Listed flat horse race in Ireland open to thoroughbreds aged four years or older. It is run at the Down Royal over a distance of 1 mile and 6 furlongs (2,816 metres), and it is scheduled to take place each year in July.

The race was run over 12 furlongs until 2003 (except in 2002 when it was run over 10 furlongs) after which the distance was increased to 13 furlongs. Prior to 2018 it was open to horses aged three years or older.

The race was awarded Listed status in 2016 and increased in distance to 14 furlongs. In 2018 it was closed to three-year-olds as part of changes to enhance the European programme of stayers' races.

== Records ==
Most successful horse (2 wins):

- Master of Reality - (2020, 2021)

Leading jockey (5 wins):

- Declan McDonogh – Coat of Honour (2004), Masafi (2005), Dabadiyan (2013), Master of Reality (2021), Powerful Aggie (2023)

Leading trainer (5 wins):

- Joseph O'Brien - Downdraft (2019), Master of Reality (2020,2021), Powerful Aggie (2023), Goodie Two Shoes (2025)

== Winners ==
Year	Winner	Age	Jockey	Trainer	Time
1996	Rescue Time	3	Stephen Craine	Kevin Prendergast	2:45.30
1997	Tanzania	3	Fran Berry	Michael Grassick	2:38.00
1998	Beldarian	3	Wayne Smith	John Oxx	2:48.90
1999	Hadeb	3	Jason Behan	Dermot Weld	2:53.70
2000	Pillar Rock	4	Charlie Swan	Noel Meade	2:45.30
2001	Last Theatre	3	Kevin Manning	Jim Bolger	2:34.50
2002	Mkuzi	3	Johnny Murtagh	John Oxx	2:11.60
2003	Mobasher	4	Paul Carberry	Dermot Weld	2:36.70
2004	Coat of Honour	4	Declan McDonogh	Sir Mark Prescott	2:45.20
2005	Masafi	4	Declan McDonogh	Sir Mark Prescott	2:44.20
2006	Zanderi	3	Fran Berry	John Oxx	3:04.70
2007	Consulate	3	Kieren Fallon	David Wachman	2:48.98
2008	Mourad	3	Fran Berry	John Oxx	3:05.80
2009	Trojan War	3	Sean Levey	Aidan O'Brien	2:55.10
2010	Fictional Account	5	Pat Smullen	Vincent Ward	2:52.13
2011	Northgate	6	Pat Smullen	Joseph G Murphy	2:45.20
2012	Chicago	3	Joseph O'Brien	Aidan O'Brien	2:52.24
2013	Dabadiyan	3	Declan McDonogh	Michael Halford	2:46.61
2014	Manalapan	4	Chris Hayes	Patrick Prendergast	2:50.19
2015	Order Of St George	3	Joseph O'Brien	Aidan O'Brien	2:46.54
2016	Stellar Mass	3	Kevin Manning	Jim Bolger	3:02.60
2017	The Tartan Spartan	4	Ronan Whelan	John Patrick Shananan	3:07.56
2018	Twilight Payment	5	Kevin Manning	Jim Bolger	3:05.01
2019	Downdraft	4	Donnacha O'Brien	Joseph O'Brien	2:58.14
2020	Master of Reality (Note: The 2020 race was run in September due to the COVID-19 pandemic in Northern Ireland)	5	Wayne Lordan	Joseph O'Brien	3:11.50
2021	Master of Reality	6	Declan McDonogh	Joseph O'Brien	2:59.80
2022	Perotan	3	Wayne Lordan	Aidan O'Brien	3:05.39
2023	Powerful Aggie	5	Declan McDonogh	Joseph O'Brien	3:32.04
2024	Countess Of Tyrone	4	Billy Lee	Paddy Twomey	3:31.17
2025	Goodie Two Shoes	6	Dylan Browne McMonagle	Joseph O'Brien	3:27.95
2026	Carmers	4	Billy Lee	Paddy Twomey	3:32.74

== See also ==
- Horse racing in Ireland
- List of Irish flat horse races
