= Kilternan Stakes =

Flat horse race in Ireland

Kilternan Stakes (Paddy Power Stakes)
- Class: Group 3
- Location: Leopardstown; County Dublin, Ireland
- Inaugurated: 2001
- Race type: Flat / Thoroughbred
- Sponsor: Paddy Power
- Website: Leopardstown

Race information
- Distance: 1m 4f (2,414 metres)
- Surface: Turf
- Track: Left-handed
- Qualification: Three-years-old and up excluding Group 1 winners
- Weight: 9 st 1 lb (3yo); 9 st 9 lb (4yo+); Allowances; 3 lb for fillies and mares Penalties; 5 lb for Group 2 win* 3 lb for Group 3 win* * since 1 January
- Purse: €94,000 (2021); 1st: €59,000

Kilternan Stakes
2026
Arabian Crown	Sons And Lovers	Purview

Previous years
2025
Convergent	Fleetfoot	Sons And Lovers
2024
Trustyourinstinct	Kinesiology	Thunder Roll
2023
Adelaide River	Al Aasy	Layfayette
2022
Duke De Sessa	Thunder Kiss	Beamish
2021
Camorra	Thunder Kiss	Forbearance

2020-2011
2020
Tiger Moth	Silence Please	Up Helly Aa
2019
Norway	Buckhurst	Blenheim Palace
2018
Rostropovich	Giuseppe Garibaldi	The King
2017
Eziyra	Exemplar	Glamorous Approach
2016
Zhukova	US Army Ranger	Bondi Beach
2015
Fascinating Rock	Panama Hat	John F Kennedy
2014
Free Eagle	Elleval	Chance To Dance
2013
The United States	Elleval	Tandem
2012
Alla Speranza	Primevere	Speaking Of Which
2011
Galileo's Choice	Look At Me	Freedom

2010–2000
2010
Await The Dawn	South Easter	Nanton
2009
Poet	Allied Powers	Shreyas
2008
The Bogberry	Famous Name	Mr Medici
2007
Hearthstead Maison	Arch Rebel	Regime
2006
Frost Giant	Cougar Bay	Lord Admiral
2005
Alayan	Good Surprise	In Time's Eye
2004
Acropolis	Lord Admiral	Trefflich
2003
Mkuzi	Middlemarch	Multazem
2001
Muakaad	Chiming	Exaltation
2000
Muakaad	Dolydille	Fantasia Girl

The Kilternan Stakes, currently known for sponsorship purposes as the Paddy Power Stakes, is a Group 3 flat horse race in Ireland open to thoroughbreds aged three years or older. It is run at Leopardstown over a distance of 1 mile and 4 furlongs (2,414 metres) and it is scheduled to take place each year in September.

== History ==
Leopardstown's Trigo Stakes was temporarily switched to the venue's Irish Champion Stakes meeting in September 1999. It returned to its usual late-October fixture the following year, but a similar race called the Foxrock Stakes was retained in September.

The race became known as the Kilternan Stakes in 2001. It was named after Kilternan, a village located to the south of Leopardstown. For a period the event was classed at Listed level. It was promoted to Group 3 status in 2006. Since 2018 the race has been sponsored by Paddy Power, having previously been sponsored by KPMG. In 2014 it became part of the Irish Champions Weekend fixture and the distance was increased to 1 mile 4 furlongs from its previous distance of 1 mile 2 furlongs.

== Records ==
Most successful horse:

- no horse has won this race more than once

Leading jockey (7 wins):

- Pat Smullen – Muakaad (2001), Sights on Gold (2002), Galileo's Choice (2011), Free Eagle (2014), Fascinating Rock (2015), Zhukova (2016), Eziyra (2017)

Leading trainer (10 wins):

- Aidan O'Brien – Acropolis (2004), Frost Giant (2006), The Bogberry (2008), Poet (2009), Await the Dawn (2010), The United States (2013), Rostropovich (2018), Norway (2019), Tiger Moth (2020), Adelaide River (2023)

== Winners ==
Year	Winner	Age	Jockey	Trainer	Time
2000	Muakaad	3	Pat Shanahan	Dermot Weld	2:04.20
2001	Muakaad	4	Pat Smullen	Dermot Weld	2:04.70
2002	Sights on Gold	3	Pat Smullen	Dermot Weld	2:10.10
2003	Mkuzi	4	Johnny Murtagh	John Oxx	2:05.80
2004	Acropolis	3	Jamie Spencer	Aidan O'Brien	2:04.40
2005	Alayan	3	Christophe Soumillon	John Oxx	2:07.10
2006	Frost Giant	3	Kieren Fallon	Aidan O'Brien	2:05.10
2007	Hearthstead Maison	3	Ryan Moore	Mark Johnston	2:03.12
2008	The Bogberry	3	Colm O'Donoghue	Aidan O'Brien	2:08.60
2009	Poet	4	Johnny Murtagh	Aidan O'Brien	2:07.02
2010	Await the Dawn	3	Johnny Murtagh	Aidan O'Brien	2:05.24
2011	Galileo's Choice	5	Pat Smullen	Dermot Weld	2:05.68
2012	Alla Speranza	3	Kevin Manning	Jim Bolger	2:02.90
2013	The United States	3	Joseph O'Brien	Aidan O'Brien	2:05.59
2014	Free Eagle	3	Pat Smullen	Dermot Weld	2:03.12
2015	Fascinating Rock	4	Pat Smullen	Dermot Weld	2:38.96
2016	Zhukova	4	Pat Smullen	Dermot Weld	2:37.33
2017	Eziyra	3	Pat Smullen	Dermot Weld	2:41.52
2018	Rostropovich	3	Donnacha O'Brien	Aidan O'Brien	2:32.49
2019	Norway	3	Seamie Heffernan	Aidan O'Brien	2:32.81
2020	Tiger Moth	3	Ryan Moore	Aidan O'Brien	2:33.54
2021	Camorra	4	Gary Carroll	Ger Lyons	2:38.75
2022	Duke De Sessa	3	Chris Hayes	Dermot Weld	2:41.29
2023	Adelaide River	3	Ryan Moore	Aidan O'Brien	2:31.05
2024	Trustyourinstinct	4	Dylan Browne McMonagle	Joseph O'Brien	2:32.76
2025	Convergent	3	Clifford Lee	Karl Burke	2:35.45
2026	Arabian Crown	5	James Doyle	Charlie Appleby	2:32.21

== See also ==
- Horse racing in Ireland
- List of Irish flat horse races
