= Rekindling =

British-bred Thoroughbred racehorse

- Racing silks of Lloyd J Williams
- Sire: High Chaparral
- Grandsire: Sadler's Wells
- Dam: Sitara
- Damsire: Salse
- Sex: Stallion
- Foaled: 23 March 2014
- Country: United Kingdom
- Colour: Bay
- Breeder: Pocock Family
- Owner: Lloyd Williams and others
- Trainer: David Wachman; Joseph Patrick O'Brien; Liam Howley
- Record: 11: 4-2-0
- Earnings: £2,409,320

Major wins
- Ballysax Stakes (2017); Curragh Cup (2017); Melbourne Cup (2017)

Awards
- 2017/18 Australian Champion Stayer
- Last updated on 7 November 2017

Rekindling (foaled 23 March 2014) is a retired British-bred, Irish-trained Thoroughbred racehorse and active sire, who won the 2017 Melbourne Cup. After winning once from three starts in 2016 he developed into a high-class staying colt in the following year, winning the Ballysax Stakes and Curragh Cup as well as producing several good efforts in defeat including a second place in the Irish St Leger Trial Stakes and fourth-place finishes in the Dante Stakes and the St Leger Stakes. In November 2017 he became the youngest horse in 76 years to win the Melbourne Cup.

== Background ==
Rekindling is a bay horse bred by the Pocock Family at the Stringston Farm in Somerset. As a foal he was consigned to the Tattersalls sale in November 2014 and was bought for 60,000 guineas by the Camas Park Stud. He subsequently entered the ownership of Lloyd Williams and was sent into training with David Wachman in Ireland.

He was from the penultimate crop of foals sired by High Chaparral, who won The Derby in 2002 and the Breeders' Cup Turf in 2002 and 2003. His other progeny have included So You Think, Dundeel and Toronado. Rekindling's dam Sitara showed modest racing ability, winning one minor race in Britain from eight attempts. As a broodmare she also produced Rekindling's full-brother Golden Sword, who won the Chester Vase in 2009. She was a great granddaughter of the French mare Faizebad (foaled 1962), whose other descendants have included Doyoun and Alexandrova.

== Racing career ==
=== 2016: two-year-old season ===
As a two-year-old in 2016, Rekindling was ridden in all of his races by Wayne Lordan. On his racecourse debut on 30 July in a maiden race over one mile at Galway Races he started a 28/1 outsider and finished second of the seven runners behind the odds-on favourite Capri. He recorded his first success in a similar event at Gowran Park in September, leading from the start and coming home two and a half lengths clear of World War. On his final run of the year he was sent to France and moved up sharply in class for the Group 1 Critérium de Saint-Cloud on 30 October but made little impression and finished last of the thirteen runners.

At the end of 2016, when Wachman retired, Rekindling was transferred to the stable of Joseph O'Brien.

=== 2017: three-year-old season ===
Rekindling began his second season in the Ballysax Stakes at Leopardstown Racecourse on 8 April. The race appeared to be dominated by Joseph O'Brien's father Aidan O'Brien who sent out Yucatan, Capri and Douglas Macarthur to fill the first three spots in the betting market whils Rekindling was a 16/1 outsider. Ridden by Lordan, Rekindling settled in fifth, made steady progress in the straight, and took the lead inside the final furlong to win by half a length from Douglas Macarthur.

He was then sent to England for the Dante Stakes at York in May and finished fourth of the ten runners behind the ill-fated Permian. In the Epsom Derby on 3 June he started a 25/1 outsider and was never in serious contention, coming home sixteenth of the eighteen runners. The colt was then stepped up in distance and matched against older horses in the Group 2 Curragh Cup over fourteen furlongs at the Curragh on 2 July and started second favourite behind the veteran Wicklow Brave. He produced a strong late run to overtake Wicklow Brave in the final strides and won by half a length. He returned to the Curragh in August and finished second to Order of St George in the Irish St Leger Trial Stakes over the same distance.

On 16 September Rekindling was back in England for the St Leger Stakes at Doncaster Racecourse and finished fourth, two lengths behind the winner Capri. Rekindling was then sent to Australia to contest the 2017 Melbourne Cup over 3200 metres at Flemington Racecourse on 7 November for which he was assigned a weight of 51.5kg. Although he was still a three-year-old by Northern hemisphere reckoning he was officially a four-year-old in Australia, where horses ages advance by a year on 1 August rather than 1 January. Ridden by the Australian jockey Corey Brown he started at odds of 14/1 in a field of twenty-three. After racing in mid-division he began to make steady progress approaching the straight. He produced a strong run on the outside, overtook Johannes Vermeer 50 metres from the finish and won by half a length, with Max Dynamite taking third to complete a 1-2-3 for Irish-trained horses.

=== Later career ===
In 2018 Rekindling relocated permanently to Australia where he was trained by Liam Howley. He was off the track until March 2019 when he finished last of the fifteen runners in the Australian Cup at Flemington.

== Stud career ==
Rekindling relocated back to Europe and stands at William Fox's Kenmare Castle Stud near Limerick, Ireland.

== Pedigree ==
Pedigree of Rekindling (GB) bay 2014
Sire High Chaparral (IRE) B. 1999	Sadler's Wells (USA); B. 1981	Northern Dancer (CAN); B. 1961	Nearctic (CAN)
Sire High Chaparral (IRE) B. 1999	Sadler's Wells (USA); B. 1981	Northern Dancer (CAN); B. 1961	Natalma (USA)
Sire High Chaparral (IRE) B. 1999	Sadler's Wells (USA); B. 1981	Fairy Bridge (USA); B. 1975	Bold Reason (USA)
Sire High Chaparral (IRE) B. 1999	Sadler's Wells (USA); B. 1981	Fairy Bridge (USA); B. 1975	Special (USA)
Sire High Chaparral (IRE) B. 1999	Kasora (IRE); B. 1995	Darshaan (GB); Brown 1981	Shirley Heights (GB)
Sire High Chaparral (IRE) B. 1999	Kasora (IRE); B. 1995	Darshaan (GB); Brown 1981	Delsy (FR)
Sire High Chaparral (IRE) B. 1999	Kasora (IRE); B. 1995	Kozana (GB); Brown 1982	Kris (GB)
Sire High Chaparral (IRE) B. 1999	Kasora (IRE); B. 1995	Kozana (GB); Brown 1982	Koblenza (FR)
Dam Sitara (GB) Chestnut 1998	Salse (USA); B. 1985	Topsider (USA); B. 1974	Northern Dancer (CAN)
Dam Sitara (GB) Chestnut 1998	Salse (USA); B. 1985	Topsider (USA); B. 1974	Drumtop (USA)
Dam Sitara (GB) Chestnut 1998	Salse (USA); B. 1985	Carnival Princess (USA); Chestnut 1974	Prince John (USA)
Dam Sitara (GB) Chestnut 1998	Salse (USA); B. 1985	Carnival Princess (USA); Chestnut 1974	Carnival Queen (USA)
Dam Sitara (GB) Chestnut 1998	Souk (IRE); B. 1988	Ahonoora (GB); Chestnut 1975	Lorenzaccio (GB)
Dam Sitara (GB) Chestnut 1998	Souk (IRE); B. 1988	Ahonoora (GB); Chestnut 1975	Helen Nichols (GB)
Dam Sitara (GB) Chestnut 1998	Souk (IRE); B. 1988	Soumana (FR); B. 1979	Pharly (FR)
Dam Sitara (GB) Chestnut 1998	Souk (IRE); B. 1988	Soumana (FR); B. 1979	Faizebad (FR)(family: 21-a)

== See also ==
- List of Melbourne Cup winners
