= 2017 Melbourne Cup =

Australian horse race

- Melbourne Cup
- Location: Flemington Racecourse; Melbourne, Australia
- Date: 7 November 2017
- Winning horse: Rekindling
- Starting price: $15
- Jockey: Corey Brown
- Trainer: Joseph O'Brien
- Surface: Grass
- Attendance: 90,536

Johannes Vermeer takes the lead, 200 meters to go, Johannes Vermeer in front but here comes Rekindling. Johannes Vermeer, Rekindling, Max Dynamite back to the inside at the hundred. Johannes Vermeer, Rekindling wearing it down, Johannes Vermeer and Rekindling stride for stride, Rekindling has won the Emirates Melbourne Cup!

— Commentator Matt Hill describes the climax of the race

The 2017 Emirates Melbourne Cup was the 157th running of the Melbourne Cup, a prestigious Australian Thoroughbred horse race. The race, run over 3,200 metres (1.988 mi), was held on 7 November 2017 at Melbourne's Flemington Racecourse.

The race was won by Rekindling (foaled 23 March 2014) who was the first 3 year old horse to win the Cup since Skipton in 1941. He was ridden by Corey Brown and trained by Joseph O'Brien. Johannes Vermeer finished second and Max Dynamite was third.

== Field ==
Number	Horse	Trainer	Jockey	Weight (kg)	Barrier	Placing
1	Hartnell	James Cummings	Damian Lane	57.5	12	20th
2	Almandin	Robert Hickmott	Frankie Dettori	56.5	14	12th
3	Humidor	Darren Weir	Blake Shinn	56	13	19th
4	Tiberian	Alan Couteil	Olivier Peslier	55.5	23	7th
5	Marmelo	Hughie Morrison	Hugh Bowman	55	16	9th
6	Red Cardinal	Andreas Wohler	Kerrin McEvoy	55	24	11th
7	Johannes Vermeer	Aidan O'Brien	Ben Melham	54.5	3	2nd
8	Bondi Beach	Robert Hickmott	Michael Walker	54	1	22nd
9	Max Dynamite	Willie Mullins	Zac Purton	54	2	3rd
10	Ventura Storm	David & B Hayes & T Dabernig	Glen Boss	54	6	21st
11	Who Shot Thebarman	Chris Waller	Tommy Berry	54	20	Scratched
12	Wicklow Brave	Willie Mullins	Stephen Baster	54	8	10th
13	Big Duke	Darren Weir	Brenton Avdulla	53.5	5	4th
14	US Army Ranger	Joseph O'Brien	Jamie Spencer	53.5	22	18th
15	Boom Time	David & B Hayes & T Dabernig	Cory Parish	53	9	15th
16	Gallante	Robert Hickmott	Michael Dee	53	18	23rd
17	Libran	Chris Waller	Dwayne Dunn	53	7	8th
18	Nakeeta	Iain Jardine	Glyn Schofield	53	19	5th
19	Single Gaze	Nick Olive	Kathy O’Hara	53	11	17th
20	Wall of Fire	Hugo Palmer	Craig Williams	53	15	16th
21	Thomas Hobson	Willie Mullins	Ben Allen	52	21	6th
22	Rekindling	Joseph O’Brien	Corey Brown	51.5	4	1st
23	Amelie’s Star	Darren Weir	Dean Yendall	51	10	14th
24	Cismontane	Gai Waterhouse & Adrian Bott	Beau Mertens	50	17	13th

== See also ==
- List of Melbourne Cup winners
- List of Melbourne Cup placings
