= Order of St George (horse) =

Irish-bred Thoroughbred racehorse

- Racing silks of Michael Tabor and Lloyd J Williams
- Sire: Galileo
- Grandsire: Sadler's Wells
- Dam: Another Storm
- Damsire: Gone West
- Sex: Stallion
- Foaled: 22 February 2012
- Country: Ireland
- Colour: Bay
- Breeder: Paget Bloodstock
- Owner: Sue Magnier, Michael Tabor, Derrick Smith & Lloyd Williams
- Trainer: Aidan O'Brien
- Record: 25: 13-6-1
- Earnings: £1,986,324

Major wins
- Her Majesty's Plate (2015); Irish St Leger Trial Stakes (2015, 2016, 2017); Irish St. Leger (2015, 2017); Saval Beg Stakes (2016, 2017, 2018); Ascot Gold Cup (2016); British Champions Long Distance Cup (2017); Vintage Crop Stakes (2018)

Awards
- Top-rated Irish racehorse (2015); World's top-rated racehorse (Extended distance) (2015); Cartier Champion Stayer (2016, 2017)

Order of St George (foaled 22 February 2012) is an Irish Thoroughbred racehorse. He is a specialist stayer whose wins include two Irish St. Legers and an Ascot Gold Cup.

As a two-year-old in 2014 he showed promising but unremarkable form, easily winning a maiden race on his third appearance but being beaten when tried in higher class in two subsequent starts. In the following year he was campaigned exclusively against older horses over extended distances. After being narrowly beaten by Bondi Beach on his first appearance of the season he recorded wide-margin victories in his three other races, winning a minor race at Down Royal, the Irish St. Leger Trial Stakes and the Irish St. Leger. At the end of the season he was rated the seventh-best racehorse in the world.

In 2016 he won the Saval Beg Stakes, Irish St. Leger Trial and the Ascot Gold Cup as well as finishing third in the Prix de l'Arc de Triomphe. As a five-year-old he was narrowly beaten in the Ascot Gold Cup but recorded repeat wins in the Saval Beg Stakes, Irish St. Leger Trial and Irish St. Leger and also won the British Champions Long Distance Cup.

== Background ==
Order of St George is a bay horse with a small white star bred in Ireland by Paget Bloodstock. He was sired by Galileo, who won the Derby, Irish Derby and King George VI and Queen Elizabeth Stakes in 2001. Galileo is now one of the world's leading stallions and has been champion sire of Great Britain and Ireland five times. His other progeny include Cape Blanco, Frankel, Golden Lilac, Nathaniel, New Approach, Rip Van Winkle and Ruler of the World. Order of St George's dam Another Storm showed modest racing ability, winning one minor race from four attempts but was a daughter of the American Champion Two-Year-Old Filly Storm Song. Storm Song was a descendant of the American broodmare Friar's Carse who is the female-line ancestor of many major winners including Rachel Alexandra, Sword Dancer and Hail To All.

In September 2012 the yearling was offered for sale at Keeneland and was bought for $550,000 by Blandford Bloodstock acting on behalf of John Magnier's Coolmore Stud. Like many Coolmore horses the colt's ownership has changed from race to race but he has usually raced for the partnership of Michael Tabor, Sue Magnier and Derrick Smith. Order of St George has been trained throughout his racing career by Aidan O'Brien at Ballydoyle.

== Racing career ==
=== 2014: two-year-old season ===
On his racecourse debut Order of St George was ridden by Seamie Heffernan in a maiden race over one mile at Leopardstown Racecourse on 24 July and finished fourth behind the Jim Bolger-trained Hall of Fame. Joseph O'Brien took the ride in a seven furlong maiden at Naas Racecourse eleven days later when the colt finished second of the fifteen runners, beaten three quarters of a length by Bolger's Parish Boy. On 14 August Order of St George started 2/5 favourite for an eight-runner maiden on soft ground at Leopardstown. Ridden by O'Brien, he went to the front on the final turn and drew away in the straight to win "easily" by eight and a half lengths despite being eased down in the closing stages.

After an eight-week break Order of St George was sent to England and moved up in class for the Group Three Autumn Stakes at Newmarket Racecourse on 11 October. He was made the 3/1 second choice in the betting but after being hampered a quarter of a mile from the finish he could make little progress in the closing stages and finished fifth behind Commemorative. Two weeks later he has reunited with Heffernan and started favourite for the Listed Eyrefield Stakes at Leopardstown. He sweated up before the race (as he had before his maiden win) and after taking the lead two furlongs out he was caught in the final strides and beaten half a length by Parish Boy.

=== 2015: three-year-old season ===
Order of St George made his three-year-old debut on 28 June in the Group Three Curragh Cup over one mile and six furlongs in which he was matched against older horses. He was ridden by Ryan Moore whilst Heffernan took the ride on his stablemate Bondi Beach. Starting the 4/1 second favourite behind Forgotten Rules (winner of the British Champions Long Distance Cup) he moved up to dispute the lead in the straight, but got the worse of a sustained struggle with Bondi Beach and was beaten a short head. In July he was dropped in class for Her Majesty's Plate over one mile and five furlong at Down Royal and led from soon after the start to win "comfortably" by five and a half lengths from the six-year-old gelding Chapter Seven. On 24 August Order of St George, ridden by Heffernan, was matched against four older horses in the Irish St. Leger Trial at the Curragh and was made the 4/6 favourite. The O'Brien stable was also represented by Kingfisher, the runner up in the Irish Derby and the Ascot Gold Cup, whilst the other runners included Sea Moon who was returning from a lengthy absence. Order of St George sweated up yet again before the race but produced an impressive performance, taking the lead a furlong and a half from the finish and winning by seven and a half lengths from Sea Moon, who was in turn eight and a half lengths clear of Kingfisher.

Order of St George was strongly supported in the betting for the St Leger Stakes on 12 September but bypassed the English race (in which Bondi Beach was controversially defeated by the filly Simple Verse) in favour of the Irish St. Leger on the following day. O'Brien felt that the colt would have been unsuited by the good-to-firm ground at Doncaster and would be more at home on softer surface at the Curragh. Ridden by Joseph O'Brien he was the only three-year-old in the field but started the 5/4 favourite ahead of ten older stayers. His rivals included Forgotten Rules, Brown Panther, Agent Murphy (Geoffrey Freer Stakes), Second Step (Grosser Preis von Berlin), Sea Moon, Kingfisher, Wicklow Brave (County Hurdle), Gospel Choir (Yorkshire Cup) and Vent de Force (Henry II Stakes). After being restrained towards the rear of the field, the favourite moved into contention with half a mile left to run and went to the front soon after turning into the straight. He drew right away from his opponents in the closing stages and won by eleven lengths from Agent Murphy with Wicklow Brave and Forgotten Rules in third and fourth. His victory was largely overshadowed by the fatal injury sustained by the popular Brown Panther. After the race Aidan O'Brien commented "When Joseph said go, he quickened up very well. It's unusual for a horse that stays that well to have that kind of class. He's a very exciting horse".

After his win at the Curragh Order of St George was expected to be sent to contest the Melbourne Cup after a share in the horse was sold to the Australian businessman Lloyd Williams. O'Brien however, opted not to make the trip to Australia, reportedly because he felt that the colt would be unsuited by the firm ground.

=== 2016: four-year-old season ===
As a four-year-old Order of St George was aimed at the Ascot Gold Cup and made his first appearance of 2016 in the Listed Saval Beg Stakes over one mile and six furlongs at Leopardstown on 3 June. After being settled at the rear of the field by Donnacha O'Brien, he moved up on the outside, took the lead a furlong out and drew away to win by four and a half lengths at odds of 2/7. At Royal Ascot on 16 June Order Of St George under Ryan Moore started odds-on favourite in a seventeen-runner field for the Gold Cup over two and a half miles. His opponents included Max Dynamite (2nd in the Melbourne Cup), Flying Officer (British Champions Long Distance Cup), Clever Cookie (Yorkshire Cup), Mizzou (Sagaro Stakes), Pallasator (Doncaster Cup) Sheikhzayedroad (Northern Dancer Turf Stakes) and Mille Et Mille (Prix du Cadran). Moore settled the colt in mid-division as Mille Et Mille set a "stop-start" pace, but the favourite struggled to obtain a clear run when he attempted a forward move five furlongs out. After being switched left on the final turn Order of St George gained the advantage in the straight and drew away to win by three lengths from Mizzou. O'Brien, who was winning the race for a record seventh time said "It was a little bit messy and rough and because he had never run over the trip before, Ryan had to put him to sleep. He's a horse that loves racing".

On 20 August Order of St George was ridden by his trainer's son Donnacha O'Brien when he started 2/11 favourite for the Irish St. Leger Trial. He repeated his 2015 success, winning "comfortably" by a length and a half from the three-year-old Twilight Payment, to whom he was conceding seventeen pounds. Only three horses appeared to face Order of St George when he started at odds of 1/7 in his attempt to win a second Irish St. Leger on 11 September. In a major upset he was unable to overhaul the front-running Wicklow Brave and was beaten half a length into second place. On 2 October the colt was one of sixteen horses to contest the Prix de l'Arc de Triomphe over 2400 metres, the shortest distance over which he had raced since his two-year-old career. Ridden for the first time by Frankie Dettori he raced among the leaders from the start and kept on in the straight to finish third behind his stablemates Found and Highland Reel.

On 15 October the colt was moved back up in distance for the British Champions Long Distance Cup over two miles at Ascot and was made the 4/6 favourite against nine opponents. After racing in sixth he stayed on strongly in the straight without looking likely to win and finished fourth behind Sheikhzayedroad, Quest For More and Simple Verse, beaten one and a half lengths by the winner.

=== 2017: five-year-old season ===
On his first appearance as a five-year-old Order of St George started odds-on favourite for the Vintage Crop Stakes at Navan on 23 April but was beaten into second place by the five-year-old gelding Torcedor, to whom he was conceding five pounds in weight. He returned to winning form at leopardstown in May when he repeated his 2016 success in the Saval Beg Stakes, taking the event "comfortably" by two and a quarter lengths from Twilight Payment. On 22 June attempted to repeat his 2016 victory in the Ascot Gold Cup and started the 5/6 favourite in a field of four teen. After being restrained by Moore in the early stages he began to make up ground approaching the straight and stayed on strongly in the closing stages. In a very close and exciting finish he has beaten a short head by the six-year-old gelding Big Orange.

After an eight-week break, Order of St George returned in the Irish St. Leger Trial at the Curragh on 19 August. Starting at odds of 1/2 he took the lead two furlongs out and won "easily" by almost five lengths from his stablemate Rekindling with Twilight Payment and Wicklow Brave in third and fourth. On 10 September Order of St George contested his third Irish St. Leger and started the 2/5 favourite. His opponents included Dartmouth (Hardwicke Stakes, Yorkshire Cup), Wicklow Brave, Torcedor, Twilight Payment and Western Hymn (Ormonde Stakes). After being restrained by Moore in the early stages and turning into the straight in sixth place, he took the lead three furlongs out and drew right away from his rivals to win by nine lengths.

The horse finished the season with a seventh Group race victory, in the British Champions Long Distance Cup, heading Torcedor late on.

=== 2018: six-year-old season ===
In 2018 Order of St George won the Vintage Crop Stakes and a third Saval Beg Stakes but finished fourth behind Stradivarius when joint-favourite for the Ascot Gold Cup.

On 11 September Aidan O'Brien announced that the horse had been retired. He explained "It's nothing serious, just age has caught up with him, and we thought it was the right thing to do for the horse".

== Stud career ==
Order Of George currently stands at Castlehyde Stud for Coolmore as a National Hunt stallion for a service fee of £6,500.

== Assessment and honors ==
At the end of the 2015 season Order of St George was nominated for the title of Cartier Champion Stayer but the award went to Simple Verse. In the 2015 World's Best Racehorse Rankings Order of St George was given a rating of 124, making him the top-rated Irish horse and top-rated horse in the Extended distance division. He was also ranked the third best three-year-old behind American Pharoah and Golden Horn and the seventh-best racehorse in the world of any age or sex. On 8 November 2016 Order of St George was named Champion Stayer at the Cartier Racing Awards.

On 16 November 2017 at the Cartier Racing Awards, Order of St George was named Champion Stayer for the second time. In the 2017 World's Best Racehorse Rankings, Order of St George was rated the twelfth-best horse in the world, the best horse in Ireland and the best horse over extended distances.

== Pedigree ==
Pedigree of Order of St George (IRE), bay colt, 2012
| Sire Galileo (IRE) 1998 | Sadler's Wells (USA); 1981 | Northern Dancer | Nearctic |
| Sire Galileo (IRE) 1998 | Sadler's Wells (USA); 1981 | Northern Dancer | Natalma |
| Sire Galileo (IRE) 1998 | Sadler's Wells (USA); 1981 | Fairy Bridge | Bold Reason |
| Sire Galileo (IRE) 1998 | Sadler's Wells (USA); 1981 | Fairy Bridge | Special |
| Sire Galileo (IRE) 1998 | Urban Sea (USA); 1989 | Miswaki | Mr. Prospector |
| Sire Galileo (IRE) 1998 | Urban Sea (USA); 1989 | Miswaki | Hopespringseternal |
| Sire Galileo (IRE) 1998 | Urban Sea (USA); 1989 | Allegretta | Lombard |
| Sire Galileo (IRE) 1998 | Urban Sea (USA); 1989 | Allegretta | Anatevka |
| Dam Another Storm (USA) 1999 | Gone West (IRE); 1984 | Mr. Prospector | Raise a Native |
| Dam Another Storm (USA) 1999 | Gone West (IRE); 1984 | Mr. Prospector | Gold Digger |
| Dam Another Storm (USA) 1999 | Gone West (IRE); 1984 | Secrettame | Secretariat |
| Dam Another Storm (USA) 1999 | Gone West (IRE); 1984 | Secrettame | Tamerett |
| Dam Another Storm (USA) 1999 | Storm Song (USA); 1994 | Summer Squall | Storm Bird |
| Dam Another Storm (USA) 1999 | Storm Song (USA); 1994 | Summer Squall | Weekend Surprise |
| Dam Another Storm (USA) 1999 | Storm Song (USA); 1994 | Hum Along | Fappiano |
| Dam Another Storm (USA) 1999 | Storm Song (USA); 1994 | Hum Along | Minstress (Family 1-o) |
