= Storm Song =

American-bred Thoroughbred racehorse

- Sire: Summer Squall
- Grandsire: Storm Bird
- Dam: Hum Along
- Damsire: Fappiano
- Sex: Mare
- Foaled: 1994
- Country: United States
- Color: Bay
- Breeder: William S. Farish III & Dinny Phipps
- Owner: Dogwood Stable
- Trainer: Nick Zito
- Record: 12: 4-1-2
- Earnings: US$1,020,050

Major wins
- Adirondack Stakes (1996); Frizette Stakes (1996) Breeders' Cup wins: Breeders' Cup Juvenile Fillies (1996)

Awards
- American Champion Two-Year-Old Filly (1996)

Storm Song (foaled February 28, 1994 in Kentucky) is an American retired thoroughbred racemare who won the 1996 Breeders' Cup Juvenile Fillies.

Since 2023, Storm Song is the oldest Breeders' Cup winner still alive.

== Background ==
Storm Song was foaled by 1990 Preakness Stakes winner Summer Squall and foaled by Hum Along out of Fappiano. She was a bay filly bred by the partnership of William S. Farish III and Dinny Phipps.

== Career ==
During her racing career, Storm Song was owned by Dogwood Stable and trained by Nick Zito. She won the 1996 Breeders' Cup Juvenile Fillies and was voted the Eclipse Award as American Champion Two-Year-Old Filly. During her racing career, Storm Song won four of her twelve starts and earned $1,020,050.

=== Results ===
Date	Track	Race Type	Finish
2 year old
4/19/1996	Keeneland	Maiden Special Weight	1st
8/1/1996	Saratoga	Allowance	4th
8/12/1996	Saratoga	Adirondack Stakes	1st
8/30/1996	Saratoga	Spinaway Stakes	6th
9/15/1996	Belmont Park	Matron Stakes	2nd
10/6/1996	Belmont Park	Frizette Stakes	1st
10/26/1996	Woodbine	Breeders' Cup Juvenile Fillies	1st
3 year old
2/9/1997	Gulfstream Park	Davona Dale Stakes	5th
3/9/1997	Gulfstream Park	Bonnie Miss Stakes	5th
4/5/1997	Keeneland	Ashland Stakes	3rd
5/2/1997	Churchill Downs	Kentucky Oaks	3rd
5/31/1997	Belmont Park	Acorn Stakes	7th

== Breeding record ==
None of her 11 foals won a graded stakes race, with the best result being Trojan Nation, who finished 2nd in the 2016 Wood Memorial. Storm Song's daughter Another Storm is the dam of the Irish St Leger winner Order of St George.

Foaled	Name	Sire	Sex
1999	Another Storm	Gone West	Filly
2000	Winged Foot Willie	Coronado's Quest	Colt
2001	Strawberry Fair	Kingmambo	Filly
2002	Spring Rain	Dubai Millennium	Filly
2003	Quiet Life	Sunday Silence	Filly
2005	Desert Chill	Red Ransom	Filly
2008	Balladry	Unbridled's Song	Colt
2009	Wild Idle	Seeking the Gold	Filly
2013	Trojan Nation	Street Cry	Colt
2016	Happy Tune	Bernardini	Filly
2018	My Favorite Uncle	Uncle Mo	Gelding

== Pedigree ==
Pedigree of Storm Song, bay mare, 1994
Sire Summer Squall	Storm Bird	Northern Dancer	Nearctic
Sire Summer Squall	Storm Bird	Northern Dancer	Natalma
Sire Summer Squall	Storm Bird	South Ocean	New Providence
Sire Summer Squall	Storm Bird	South Ocean	Shining Sun
Sire Summer Squall	Weekend Surprise	Secretariat	Bold Ruler
Sire Summer Squall	Weekend Surprise	Secretariat	Somethingroyal
Sire Summer Squall	Weekend Surprise	Lassie Dear	Buckpasser
Sire Summer Squall	Weekend Surprise	Lassie Dear	Gay Missle
Dam Hum Along	Fappiano	Mr. Prospector	Raise a Native
Dam Hum Along	Fappiano	Mr. Prospector	Gold Digger
Dam Hum Along	Fappiano	Killaloe	Dr. Fager
Dam Hum Along	Fappiano	Killaloe	Grand Splendor
Dam Hum Along	Minstress	The Minstrel	Northern Dancer
Dam Hum Along	Minstress	The Minstrel	Fleur
Dam Hum Along	Minstress	Fleet Victress	King of the Tudors
Dam Hum Along	Minstress	Fleet Victress	Countess Fleet (family: 1-o)
