= Galtres Stakes =

Flat horse race in Britain

- Class: Listed
- Location: York Racecourse; York, England
- Race type: Flat / Thoroughbred
- Sponsor: British EBF
- Website: York

Race information
- Distance: 1m 3f 188y (2,385 metres)
- Surface: Turf
- Track: Left-handed
- Qualification: Three-years-old and up fillies & mares exc. Group race winners and Group 1 placed since two years old.
- Weight: 9 st 0 lb (3yo); 9 st 9 lb (4yo+); Penalties; 4 lb for Listed winners* * after 2021
- Purse: £100,000 (2025); 1st: £56,710

Galtres Stakes
2026
Prizeland	Rhapsody	Capichera

Previous years
2025
Charlotte's Web	Crepe Suzette	Karmology
2024
Scenic	Karmology	Nakheel
2023
Sea Theme	One Evening	Tregony
2022
Haskoy	Time Lock	Judith
2021
Forbearance	Domino Darling	Glenartney

2020-2011
2020
Gold Wand	Vivionn	Award Scheme
2019
Search For A Song	Vivionn	Spirit Of Appin
2018
Lah Ti Dar	Light Of Joy	Sun Maiden
2017
Fleur Forsyte	More Mischief	Aljezeera
2016
Abingdon	To Eternity	Pandora
2015
Martlet	Koora	Dark Crusader
2014
Queen Of Ice	Arabian Comet	Noble Protector
2013
Our Obsession	Say	Jathabah
2012
Pale Mimosa	Sequence	Cracking Lass
2011
Set To Music	Cracking Lass	Polly's Mark

2010-2001
2010
Brushing	Sense Of Purpose	Copperbeech
2009
Tanoura	Leocorno	Flame Of Gibraltar
2007
Wannabe Posh	Brisk Breeze	Mussoorie
2006
Anna Pavlova	Bunood	Gower Song
2005
Kastoria	Albahja	Desert Move
2004
Tarakala	Selebela	Desert Royalty
2003
Mezzo Soprano	Thingmebob	Singleton
2002
Alexander Three D	Rosa Parks	Frosty Welcome
2001
Inchiri	Panna	Love Everlasting

2000-1991
2000
Firecrest	Fantasia Girl	Hiddnah
1999
Innuendo	Credit-A-Plenty	Sweet Sorrow
1998
Rambling Rose	Bristol Channel	Kadaka
1997
Kaliana	The Faraway Tree	Book At Bedtime
1996
Eva Luna	Time Allowed	Priolina
1995
Larrocha	Segovia	Majestic Role
1994
Noble Rose	Yenda	Frustration
1993
Kithanga	Alouette	Anne Bonny
1992
Cunning	Percy's Girl	Shirley Valentine
1991
Nibbs Point	Always Friendly	Tiger Flower

1990-1988
1990
Madiriya	Madame Dubois	Secret Waters
1989
Knoosh	Nesaah	Pretty Thing
1988
Upend	Percy's Lass	Banket

The Galtres Stakes is a Listed flat horse race in Great Britain open to fillies and mares aged three years or older. It is run at York over a distance of 1 mile 3 furlongs and 188 yards (2,385 metres), and it is scheduled to take place each year in August. Since 2014 the race has carried the name of Sir Henry Cecil, a former British flat racing Champion Trainer who died in 2013. It is currently held on the second day of York's four-day Ebor Festival meeting.

== Records ==
Most successful horse:

- no horse has won this race more than once

Leading jockey (7 wins):

- Frankie Dettori – Madiriya (1990), Nibbs Point (1991), Cunning (1992), Mezzo Soprano (2003), Our Obsession (2013), Martlet (2015), Lah Ti Dar (2018)

Leading trainer (8 wins):

- Luca Cumani – Madiriya (1990), Nibbs Point (1991), Cunning (1992), Kithanga (1993), Noble Rose (1994), Larrocha (1995), Kaliana (1997), Innuendo (1999)

== Winners ==
Year	Winner	Age	Jockey	Trainer	Time
1947	Solar System	3	Harry Carr	Cecil Boyd-Rochfort	2:39.00
1948	Pretexte	3	Joe Sime	Robert Colling	2:32.20
1949	Danse d'Espoir	3	Harry Carr	Cecil Boyd-Rochfort	2:33.80
1950	Antakia	3	Bill Evans	François Mathet	2:39.80
1951	Limicola	3	Gordon Richards	Norman Bertie	2:33.80
1952	Chione	3	Harry Carr	Cecil Boyd-Rochfort	2:33.80
1953	Lunaria	3	Doug Smith	George Colling	2:32.20
1954	Prudence	3	Bill Rickaby	Jack Jarvis	2:59.20
1955	Sumidea	3	Joe Mercer	Jack Colling	2:33.80
1956	Italian Mist	3	Bill Rickaby	Paddy Prendergast	2:40.80
1957	Heritiere	3	Manny Mercer	George Colling	2:40.20
1958	Temptress	3	Manny Mercer	Jack Jarvis	2:42.60
1959	Blue Riband	3	Harry Carr	Cecil Boyd-Rochfort	2:34.00
1960	Caistor Top	3	Joe Sime	Sam Hall	2:40.00
1961	Antigua	3	Geoff Lewis	Peter Hastings-Bass	2:37.00
1962	Romantica	3	Bill Williamson	Harry Wragg	2:37.80
1963	Turf	3	Eph Smith	Bernard van Cutsem	2:40.20
1964	Patti	3	Lester Piggott	Paddy Prendergast	2:36.60
1965	Take A Chance	3	Eddie Hide	Bill Elsey	2:34.80
1966	Criffel	3	Ron Hutchinson	John Dunlop	2:36.60
1967	Bamboozle	3	Lester Piggott	Sam Armstrong	2:41.20
1968	Top Line	3	Sandy Barclay	Noel Murless	2:37.80
1969	Splash Down	3	Bill Williamson	Gordon Smyth	2:34.40
1970	Pretty Puffin	3	Lester Piggott	Sam Armstrong	2:43.60
1971	No Surtax	3	Geoff Lewis	Noel Murless	2:35.50
1972	Carrot Top	3	Lester Piggott	Jeremy Tree	2:30.20
1973	Reload	3	Tony Murray	Harry Wragg	2:36.60
1974	Evening Venture	3	John Gorton	Bruce Hobbs	2:35.78
1975	Lucky For Me	3	Tony Murray	Con Collins	2:30.74
1976	Capricious	3	Christy Roche	Paddy Prendergast	2:30.65
1977	Galletto	3	Lester Piggott	Vincent O'Brien	2:36.29
1978	Tartan Pimpernel	3	Willie Carson	Dick Hern	2:32.54
1979	Odeon	3	Joe Mercer	Henry Cecil	2:39.11
1980	Deadly Serious	3	Lester Piggott	Dick Hern	2:34.60
1981	Ma Femme	3	Geoff Baxter	Bruce Hobbs	2:35.49
1982	Sans Blague	3	Willie Carson	Dick Hern	2:33.08
1983	Hymettus	3	Lester Piggott	John Dunlop	2:32.32
1984	Borushka	3	Kevin Darley	Fulke Johnson Houghton	2:31.48
1985	Ulterior Motive	3	Pat Eddery	John Dunlop	2:36.24
1986	Startino	3	Steve Cauthen	Henry Cecil	2:30.72
1987	Professional Girl	3	Pat Eddery	Jeremy Tree	2:35.11
1988	Upend	3	Steve Cauthen	Henry Cecil	2:34.88
1989	Knoosh	3	Walter Swinburn	Michael Stoute	2:30.77
1990	Madiriya	3	Frankie Dettori	Luca Cumani	2:29.06
1991	Nibbs Point	3	Frankie Dettori	Luca Cumani	2:34.86
1992	Cunning	3	Frankie Dettori	Luca Cumani	2:28.57
1993	Kithanga	3	Ray Cochrane	Luca Cumani	2:33.14
1994	Noble Rose	3	Michael Kinane	Luca Cumani	2:29.96
1995	Larrocha	3	Michael Kinane	Luca Cumani	2:28.54
1996	Eva Luna	4	Pat Eddery	Henry Cecil	2:27.14
1997	Kaliana	3	John Reid	Luca Cumani	2:33.76
1998	Rambling Rose	3	Pat Eddery	Michael Stoute	2:25.93
1999	Innuendo	4	John Reid	Luca Cumani	2:32.24
2000	Firecrest	3	Richard Quinn	John Dunlop	2:28.55
2001	Inchiri	3	Franny Norton	Gerard Butler	2:30.60
2002	Alexander Three D	3	Michael Hills	Barry Hills	2:27.04
2003	Mezzo Soprano	3	Frankie Dettori	Saeed Bin Suroor	2:28.85
2004	Tarakala	3	Michael Kinane	John Oxx	2:37.68
2005	Kastoria	4	Michael Kinane	John Oxx	2:30.36
2006	Anna Pavlova	3	Paul Hanagan	Richard Fahey	2:36.60
2007	Wannabe Posh	4	Eddie Ahern	John Dunlop	2:33.06
2008	Abandoned due to waterlogging
2009	Tanoura	3	Michael Kinane	John Oxx	2:32.64
2010	Brushing	4	Kieren Fallon	Mark Tompkins	2:31.97
2011	Set To Music	3	Jamie Spencer	Michael Bell	2:35.94
2012	Pale Mimosa	3	Pat Smullen	Dermot Weld	2:31.98
2013	Our Obsession	3	Frankie Dettori	William Haggas	2:31.99
2014	Queen of Ice	3	Andrea Atzeni	William Haggas	2:32.42
2015	Martlet	3	Frankie Dettori	John Gosden	2:32.35
2016	Abingdon	3	Andrea Atzeni	Sir Michael Stoute	2:33.84
2017	Fleur Forsyte	3	Daniel Muscutt	James Fanshawe	2:37.12
2018	Lah Ti Dar	3	Frankie Dettori	John Gosden	2:31.22
2019	Search For A Song	3	Oisin Murphy	Dermot Weld	2:30.30
2020	Gold Wand	3	Andrea Atzeni	Roger Varian	2:34.27
2021	Forbearance	4	Hollie Doyle	Jessica Harrington	2:27.66
2022	Haskoy	3	Ryan Moore	Ralph Beckett	2:30.75
2023	Sea Theme	3	Tom Marquand	William Haggas	2:28.09
2024	Scenic	4	Oisin Murphy	Ed Walker	2:28.27
2025	Charlotte's Web	4	Daniel Tudhope	Simon & Ed Crisford	2:28.63
2026	Prizeland	3	Oisin Murphy	Andrew Balding	2:34.94

== See also ==
- Horse racing in Great Britain
- List of British flat horse races
