= Oisin Orr =

Irish jockey born 1997

Personal information
- Born: September 1997 (age 28–29) Rathmullan, County Donegal
- Occupation: Jockey

Horse racing career
- Sport: Horse racing

Major racing wins
- Irish St. Leger (2020)

Significant horses
- Search For A Song; Spirit Dancer

Oisin Orr (born September 1997) is an Irish jockey who competes in flat racing.

One of seven siblings, Orr grew up in Rathmullan in County Donegal. His father, Raymond Orr, kept ponies and Orr learned to ride at an early age. He rode on the pony racing circuit, achieving 33 winners. His older brother, Connor, is a National Hunt jockey and younger siblings are involved in show-jumping. He served his apprenticeship with Joanna Morgan and then Edward Lynam.

Orr rode his first winner, Balmont Blast, trained by Edward Lynam, at Dundalk on 23 January 2015. He was champion Irish apprentice in 2017 and joint champion Irish apprentice with Andrew Slattery in 2019. He rode his first Group race winner while still an apprentice, when Imaging, trained by Dermot Weld won the Group 3 Gladness Stakes at the Curragh in April 2019. Hazapour, also trained by Weld, provided him with another Group 3 success the following month when winning the Amethyst Stakes at Leopardstown. At the end of May 2019, Orr rode out his claim with 95 winners.

In September 2020, Orr achieved his first Group 1 and Irish Classic success when Search For A Song, trained by Weld, landed the Irish St. Leger at the Curragh.

In 2022, Orr moved to Malton, North Yorkshire, to take up a position as stable jockey to trainer Richard Fahey. He established a successful partnership on Fahey's Spirit Dancer, winning back-to-back Bahrain International Trophies in Dubai in 2024 and 2025, as well as the Neom Turf Cup in Riyadh in 2024. When a fetlock injury put an end to Spirit Dancer's racing career, Orr arranged for him to spend his retirement with his step-mother Rachael Carton in Rathmullan.

Orr is tall for a flat jockey at 5 feet 11 inches and has to restrict his food intake to keep his weight down. He received the 2020 and 2023 Donegal Sportstar of the Year awards.

== Major wins ==
(Republic of Ireland) Ireland

- Irish St. Leger - (1) Search For A Song (2020)
