= Curragh Cup =

Flat horse race in Ireland

- Class: Group 2
- Location: Curragh Racecourse; County Kildare, Ireland
- Inaugurated: 1987
- Race type: Flat / Thoroughbred
- Sponsor: Comer Group
- Website: Curragh

Race information
- Distance: 1m 6f (2,816 metres)
- Surface: Turf
- Track: Right-handed
- Qualification: Three-years-old and up
- Weight: 8 st 10 lb (3yo); 9 st 11 lb (4yo+); Allowances; 3 lb for fillies and mares Penalties; 3 lb for Group 1 winners * * at 11 furlongs or over since 1 November last year
- Purse: €120,000 (2022); 1st: €70,800

Curragh Cup
2026
Trustyourinstinct	Happy Pharoah	Al Riffa

Previous years
2025
Al Riffa	Shackleton	Drawn To Dream
2024
Tower Of London	Grosvenor Square	Vauban
2023
Emily Dickinson	Rosscarbery	Amusement
2022
Camorra	Gear Up	Wordsworth
2021
Amhran Na Bhfiann	Pondus	Passion

2020-2011
2020
Twilight Payment	Master Of Reality	Camphor
2019
Twilight Payment	Latrobe	Raa Atoll
2018
Flag Of Honour	Giuseppe Garibaldi	Twilight Payment
2017
Rekindling	Wicklow Brave	Elidor
2016
Sword Fighter	Landofhopeandglory	Alveena
2015
Bondi Beach	Order Of St George	Drifting Mist
2014
Ernest Hemingway	Certerach	Tarana
2013
Ernest Hemingway	Royal Diamond	Voleuse De Coeurs
2012
Hartani	Midnight Soprano	Offer
2011
Red Cadeaux	Zerashan	Admiral of The Red

2010-2001
2010
Tactic	Profound Beauty	Roses For The Lady
2009
Profound Beauty	Alandi	Yankee Doodle
2008
Septimus	Mores Wells	Peppertree Lane
2007
Peppertree Lane	Nick's Nikita	Alfie Flits
2006
Kastoria	Collier Hill	Mkuzi
2005
Mkuzi	Orpington	Akarem
2004
Mkuzi	Dubai Success	Cruzspiel
2003
Maharib	Arundel	Rayshan
2002
Daliapour	Boreas	Quality Team
2001
Chimes At Midnight	Mediterranean	Pillars Of Society

2000-1991
2000
Quality Team	Royal Rebel	Churlish Charm
1999
Maridpour	Yeoman's Point	Gordi
1998
Memorise	Stage Affair	Theatreworld
1997
Orchestra Stall	Zafarabad	Damancher
1996
Blushing Flame	Fill The Bill	Damancher
1995
Vintage Crop	Capias	Mohaajir
1994
Witness Box	Vintage Crop	Portrait Gallery
1993
Vintage Crop	Ballykett Lady	Garabagh
1992
Arrikala	Parting Moment	Sleet Skier
1991
Hateel	Sleet Skier	Thetford Forest

1990-1988
1990
Thetford Forest	Cheering News	Smaoineamh
1989
Tyrone Bridge	Sergeyevich	Smaoineamh
1988
Heavenly Manna	Shimshek	Skating

The Curragh Cup is a Group 2 flat horse race in Ireland open to thoroughbreds aged three years or older. It is run at the Curragh over a distance of 1 mile and 6 furlongs (2,816 metres), and it is scheduled to take place each year in late June or early July.

The event was established in 1987, and for a period it was classed at Listed level. It was promoted to Group 3 status in 1994 and upgraded again to Group 2 status in 2016.

The race is part of the Curragh's three-day Irish Derby Festival meeting, and it is currently held on the first day. The Curragh Cup has been won by several top-class horses including Almaarad, Vintage Crop, Daliapour, Kastoria, Septimus, Red Cadeaux and Rekindling.

== Records ==
Most successful horse (2 wins):

- Vintage Crop – 1993, 1995
- Mkuzi – 2004, 2005
- Ernest Hemingway - 2013, 2014
- Twilight Payment - 2019, 2020

Leading jockey (5 wins):

- Michael Kinane – Vintage Crop (1993, 1995), Daliapour (2002), Mkuzi (2004), Kastoria (2006)

Leading trainer (9 wins):

- Aidan O'Brien - Septimus (2008), Ernest Hemingway (2013, 2014), Bondi Beach (2015), Sword Fighter (2016), Flag Of Honour (2018), Amhran Na Bhfiann (2021), Emily Dickinson (2023), Tower Of London (2024)

== Winners ==
Year	Winner	Age	Jockey	Trainer	Time
1987	Almaarad	4	Pat Eddery	John Dunlop	3:11.00
1988	Heavenly Manna	3	Christy Roche	Paddy Mullins	3:04.60
1989	Tyrone Bridge	3	David Parnell	Kevin Prendergast	3:00.60
1990	Thetford Forest	3	Ron Quinton	John Oxx	2:55.40
1991	Hateel	5	Willie Carson	Peter Walwyn	3:03.70
1992	Arrikala	3	Christy Roche	Jim Bolger	2:55.40
1993	Vintage Crop	6	Michael Kinane	Dermot Weld	3:04.90
1994	Witness Box	7	John Reid	John Oxx	3:04.30
1995	Vintage Crop	8	Michael Kinane	Dermot Weld	3:00.20
1996	Blushing Flame	5	John Reid	Sir Michael Stoute	3:00.60
1997	Orchestra Stall	5	Pat Eddery	John Dunlop	3:04.50
1998	Memorise	4	Kieren Fallon	Sir Henry Cecil	3:16.30
1999	Maridpour	4	Gary Stevens	Sir Michael Stoute	3:01.40
2000	Quality Team	3	Pat Smullen	Dermot Weld	3:05.60
2001	Chimes at Midnight	4	Wayne Smith	Luke Comer	3:22.50
2002	Daliapour	6	Michael Kinane	Sir Michael Stoute	3:04.30
2003	Maharib	3	Pat Smullen	Dermot Weld	3:04.40
2004	Mkuzi	5	Michael Kinane	John Oxx	2:59.70
2005	Mkuzi	6	Fran Berry	John Oxx	3:05.50
2006	Kastoria	5	Michael Kinane	John Oxx	2:58.64
2007	Peppertree Lane	4	Kevin Darley	Mark Johnston	3:10.99
2008	Septimus	5	Johnny Murtagh	Aidan O'Brien	3:07.17
2009	Profound Beauty	5	Pat Smullen	Dermot Weld	3:03.35
2010	Tactic	4	Tadhg O'Shea	John Dunlop	2:58.92
2011	Red Cadeaux	5	Tom McLaughlin	Ed Dunlop	3:05.82
2012	Hartani	3	Johnny Murtagh	John Oxx	3:12.72
2013	Ernest Hemingway	4	Seamie Heffernan	Aidan O'Brien	2:56.33
2014	Ernest Hemingway	5	Joseph O'Brien	Aidan O'Brien	3:04.68
2015	Bondi Beach	3	Seamie Heffernan	Aidan O'Brien	3:03.31
2016	Sword Fighter	3	Seamie Heffernan	Aidan O'Brien	3:08.37
2017	Rekindling	3	Wayne Lordan	Joseph O'Brien	3:03.33
2018	Flag Of Honour	3	Ryan Moore	Aidan O'Brien	3:02.46
2019	Twilight Payment	6	Kevin Manning	Jim Bolger	3:03.83
2020	Twilight Payment	7	Declan McDonogh	Joseph O'Brien	3:07.18
2021	Amhran Na Bhfiann	4	Colin Keane	Aidan O'Brien	3:03.28
2022	Camorra	5	Colin Keane	Ger Lyons	3:03.70
2023	Emily Dickinson	4	Ryan Moore	Aidan O'Brien	3:16.00
2024	Tower Of London	4	Ryan Moore	Aidan O'Brien	3:01.60
2025	Al Riffa	5	Dylan Browne McMonagle	Joseph O'Brien	3:01.81
2026	Trustyourinstinct	6	Declan McDonogh	Joseph O'Brien	2:58.30

== See also ==
- Horse racing in Ireland
- List of Irish flat horse races
