= Free Eagle =

Irish-bred Thoroughbred racehorse

- Racing silks of Moyglare Stud
- Sire: High Chaparral
- Grandsire: Sadler's Wells
- Dam: Polished Gem
- Damsire: Danehill
- Sex: Colt
- Foaled: 4 May 2011
- Country: Ireland
- Color: Bay
- Breeder: Moyglare Stud
- Owner: Moyglare Stud
- Trainer: Dermot Weld
- Record: 7:3-1-2
- Earnings: £592,523

Major wins
- Enterprise Stakes (2015); Prince of Wales's Stakes (2015)

Free Eagle (foaled 4 May 2011) is an Irish Thoroughbred racehorse. He was very lightly campaigned in his early career, appearing four times in two years. As a juvenile he won impressively on his debut but was comprehensively beaten by Australia on his only other start. After a lengthy absence he returned in September 2014 to win the Enterprise Stakes by seven lengths and then finished third in the Champion Stakes. On his first appearance as a four-year-old he defeated a world-class field to win the Prince of Wales's Stakes.

== Background ==
Free Eagle is a bay colt with a white star bred in Ireland by his owner Moyglare Stud. His sire High Chaparral won The Derby in 2002 and the Breeders' Cup Turf in 2002 and 2003. His other progeny have included So You Think, Dundeel and Toronado. Free Eagle's dam, Polished Gem won one minor race from five attempts, but has been a successful broodmare, producing several other winners including the Sandown Mile winner Custom Cut. Polished Gem is a daughter of the Irish 1,000 Guineas winner Trusted Partner. Throughout his racing career, Free Eagle was trained at the Curragh by Dermot Weld and was ridden most of his races by Pat Smullen.

== Racing career ==
=== 2013: two-year-old season ===
Free Eagle made his racecourse debut in a one-mile maiden race at Leopardstown Racecourse on 15 August 2013. He started the 11/4 favourite against nine opponents and won "very easily" by five and a half lengths from Orchestra, a colt who went on to win the Chester Vase. After the race Smullen commented "I don't get too bullish about them normally because that's not my style but this lad has been exciting us all year. He's a lovely horse... We are very excited about his future". Despite race's modest status, Free Eagle was made 8/1 favourite for the following year's Epsom Derby. Three weeks later the colt was moved up in class to contest the Group Three Breeders' Cup Juvenile Turf Trial over the same course and distance. Starting the 2/5 favourite, he took the lead in the straight but proved no match for the Aidan O'Brien-trained Australia, and finished second, six lengths behind the winner.

=== 2014: three-year-old season ===
In April 2014 it was announced that Free Eagle had had a "training setback" and would miss both the Epsom Derby and the Irish Derby. Weld said that the colt would be reserved for an autumn campaign. After an absence of more than a year, Free Eagle returned in the Group Three Enterprise Stakes over ten furlongs at Leopardstown on 13 September 2014 in which he was opposed by the Solonaway Stakes winner Brendan Brackan and the Royal Whip Stakes winner Hall of Mirrors. Starting the 9/10 favourite, he took the lead inside the last quarter mile and accelerated clear of his rivals in the closing stages to win by seven lengths from Elleval. On his only other run of the season, Free Eagle was sent to England to contest the Champion Stakes at Ascot Racecourse on 18 October. Starting the 5/2 second favourite, he stayed on strongly in the straight to finish third behind Noble Mission and Al Kazeem, with the unplaced horses including Cirrus des Aigles and Ruler of the World.

=== 2015: four-year-old season ===
Free Eagle was expected to make his 2015 debut in the Tattersalls Gold Cup but was ruled out of the race with what was described as a "head cold". He did not appear as a four-year-old until June, when he started 5/2 favourite for the Prince of Wales's Stakes over ten furlongs at Royal Ascot. The race attracted a strong international field including The Grey Gatsby from England, Ectot from France, Spielberg (Tenno Sho) from Japan and Criterion (Queen Elizabeth Stakes) from Australia. Smullen tracked the leaders before sending the colt into the lead in the straight and held off a strong late challenge from The Grey Gatsby to win by a short head. Weld commented "When you’ve got a good horse it makes the training easy, but it hasn’t been easy with him. He got a heavy head cold a few weeks ago and I thought today was very much in doubt, but we got him right on the day that mattered".

Free Eagle was off the course for almost three months before returning for the Irish Champion Stakes at Leopardstown in September and started 100/30 second favourite behind the Epsom Derby winner Golden Horn. Pat Smullen settled the colt in fourth before moving up to challenge Golden Horn in the straight. He moved alongside the Derby winner but was badly hampered a furlong out when Golden Horn jinked sharply to the right. He dropped back as a result and finished third behind Golden Horn and Found. Free Eagle was sent to France in October and was moved up in distance for the Prix de l'Arc de Triomphe over 2400 metres at Longchamp Racecourse. Starting the 16.8/1 fourth choice in the betting he stayed on in the straight despite being slightly hampered and finished sixth, just over four lengths behind the winner Golden Horn.

== Stud career ==
=== Notable progeny ===
c = colt, f = filly, g = gelding

Foaled	Name	Sex	Major wins
2021	Birdman	g	Doomben Cup, Underwood Stakes

== Pedigree ==
Pedigree of Free Eagle (IRE), bay colt, 2011
Sire High Chaparral (IRE) 1999	Sadler's Wells (USA); 1981	Northern Dancer	Nearctic
Sire High Chaparral (IRE) 1999	Sadler's Wells (USA); 1981	Northern Dancer	Natalma
Sire High Chaparral (IRE) 1999	Sadler's Wells (USA); 1981	Fairy Bridge	Bold Reason
Sire High Chaparral (IRE) 1999	Sadler's Wells (USA); 1981	Fairy Bridge	Special
Sire High Chaparral (IRE) 1999	Kasora (IRE); 1993	Darshaan	Shirley Heights
Sire High Chaparral (IRE) 1999	Kasora (IRE); 1993	Darshaan	Delsy
Sire High Chaparral (IRE) 1999	Kasora (IRE); 1993	Kozana	Kris
Sire High Chaparral (IRE) 1999	Kasora (IRE); 1993	Kozana	Koblenza
Dam Polished Gem (IRE) 2003	Danehill (USA); 1986	Danzig	Northern Dancer
Dam Polished Gem (IRE) 2003	Danehill (USA); 1986	Danzig	Pas de Nom
Dam Polished Gem (IRE) 2003	Danehill (USA); 1986	Razyana	His Majesty
Dam Polished Gem (IRE) 2003	Danehill (USA); 1986	Razyana	Spring Adieu
Dam Polished Gem (IRE) 2003	Trusted Partner (USA); 1985	Affirmed	Exclusive Native
Dam Polished Gem (IRE) 2003	Trusted Partner (USA); 1985	Affirmed	Won't Tell You
Dam Polished Gem (IRE) 2003	Trusted Partner (USA); 1985	Talking Picture	Speak John
Dam Polished Gem (IRE) 2003	Trusted Partner (USA); 1985	Talking Picture	Poster Girl (Family 9-f)
