= Kastoria (horse) =

Irish-bred Thoroughbred racehorse

- Sire: Selkirk
- Grandsire: Sharpen Up
- Dam: Kassana
- Damsire: Shernazar
- Sex: Mare
- Foaled: 2 April 2001
- Country: Ireland
- Colour: Chestnut
- Breeder: Aga Khan IV
- Owner: Aga Khan IV
- Trainer: John Oxx
- Record: 13: 6-5-0
- Earnings: £300,846

Major wins
- Galtres Stakes (2005); Vintage Crop Stakes (2006); Curragh Cup (2006); Ballyroan Stakes (2006); Irish St. Leger (2006)

Kastoria (foaled 2 April 2001) is an Irish Thoroughbred racehorse and broodmare best known for her upset victory over Yeats in the 2006 Irish St. Leger. Bred and owned by Aga Khan IV and trained by John Oxx she was a specialist stayer who competed in five different countries and won six of her thirteen races. Unraced at two or three years she began her racing career in 2005 when she won the Galtres Stakes and finished second in the Give Thanks Stakes, Park Hill Stakes and Prix de Royallieu. In the following year she won the Vintage Crop Stakes, Curragh Cup and Ballyroan Stakes before recording her biggest win in the Irish St. Leger. She also finished second in the Hong Kong Vase on her final racecourse appearance. As a broodmare she has produced some minor winners.

== Background ==
Kastoria is a chestnut mare with a broad white blaze and white socks on her hind legs. bred in Ireland by her owner Aga Khan IV. During her racing career she was trained at Kilcullen in County Kildare by John Oxx and was ridden in ten of her thirteen races by Mick Kinane.

She was sired by Selkirk an American-bred miler who won the Queen Elizabeth II Stakes in 1991. As a breeding stallion, his other successful offspring included Wince, Sublimity, Cityscape (Dubai Duty Free) and Thistle Bird (Pretty Polly Stakes). Her dam Kassana showed considerable racing ability, winning the Group 3 Prix Minerve as a three-year-old in 1997. She was a descendant of the Irish broodmare Kalkeen (foaled 1974), making her a close relative of several major winners including Kahyasi, Milan and Key Change.

== Racing career ==
=== 2005: four-year-old season ===
Unusually for a modern racehorse, Kastoria did not appear on the track until the age of four, making her debut on 10 June 2005 2005 when she finished second in a maiden race over one mile and five furlongs at Wexford Racecourse. In a similar event at Limerick three weeks later as she won by two lengths at odds of 9/4. She was then stepped up in class for the Listed Give Thanks Stakes at Cork Racecourse on 1 August and finished second, beaten a short head by the Aidan O'Brien-trained Mona Lisa. Eighteen days after her run at Cork the filly was sent to England and started the 6/4 favourite against nine opponents in the Listed Galtres Stakes at York Racecourse. After tracking the leaders, she produced a sustained run in the straight, overtook the front-running Albahja inside the final furlong and won buy half a length.

Kastoria was back in England in September for the Group 2 Park Hill Stakes at Doncaster Racecourse in which she was made 7/2 co-favourite alongside Punctilious and the French-trained mare Sweet Stream (winner of the 2004 Prix Vermeille). She took the lead in the straight but was overtaken in the closing stages and beaten into second by Sweet Stream. On her final appearance of the season she was sent to France for the Prix de Royallieu over 2500 metres at Longchamp Racecourse on 1 October in which she finished second to the favoured Oiseau Rare.

=== 2006: five-year-old season ===
Kastoria's first run of 2006 saw her made odds-on favourite, ahead of the Mooresbridge Stakes winner Cairdeas in the Listed Vintage Crop Stakes at Navan Racecourse on 30 April. After racing in fifth place she made steady progress in the straight, went to the front with a furlong and a half left to run and won by a length from her stablemate Virginia Woolf. In May she started favourite for the Yorkshire Cup but finished fourth of the seven runners behind the five-year-old gelding Percussionist. On 1 July the mare started 9/4 favourite for the Curragh Cup ahead of Collier Hill and Mkuzi, a seven-year-old gelding who had won the race for the last two years. After being restrained by Kinane at the rear of the seven-runner field she stayed on strongly in the straight took the lead inside the final furlong and held off the late challenge of Collier Hill to win by a head.

After a break of almost seven weeks, Kastoria returned in the Listed Ballyroan Stakes over one and a half miles at Leopardstown Racecourse. Starting the 4/5 favourite she raced in second behind the British-trained Foreign Affairs (winner of the Goodwood Cup) before taking the lead a furlong out and drawing away to win by three lengths. John Oxx commented "She's a lovely mare and I wish we could have one of her every year. She dosses a bit in front but hopefully she will step up again from this".

The Group 1 Irish St. Leger at the Curragh on 16 September saw the 2005 winner Yeats start the 2/7 favourite with Kastoria next in the betting on 6/1. The other six runners included Percussionist, The Whistling Teal (St Simon Stakes, Chester Cup) and Fracas (Derrinstown Stud Derby Trial). Kinane settled the mare in fourth place behind Percussionist, Yeats and Fracas in the early stages before making a forward move entering the straight by which point Yeats had gone to the front. Kastoria moved up alongside the favourite approaching the final furlong and got the better of Yeats to win by half a length. The pair finished ten lengths clear of the other runners, who were headed by The Whistling Teal. After the race Oxx said "I thought we would run Yeats close as her homework has been terrific lately. She's the type of filly who always has a bit in the tank and needs a good horse to take her along. She's had a very good season and just seems to have improved a bit. She keeps pulling out a bit more when she's got a target to follow. She loves to have a target to attack at the end and when she gets to the front she pricks her ears and doesn't do a lot".

In October Kastoria was sent to Canada where she started favourite for the Pattison Canadian International at Woodbine Racetrack but finished eighth of the ten runners behind Collier Hill. For her final racecourse appearance, the mare was shipped to Hong Kong to contest the Hong Kong Vase at Sha Tin Racecourse on 10 December. After being badly hampered and dropping back to last place entering the straight she produced a very strong finish and appeared to be an unlucky loser as she failed by a nose to overhaul Collier Hill.

== Breeding record ==
Kastoria was retired from racing to become a broodmare for the Aga Khan's stud. She produced five foals and two winners:

- Kastania, a bay filly, foaled in 2008, sired by Gone West. Won one race.
- Kastovia, chestnut filly, 2009, by Giant's Causeway. Unraced.
- Karlidi, bay colt (later gelded), 2010, Smart Strike. Failed to win in nine races.
- Kassim, bay colt, 2012, by Shamardal. Won two races.
- Kossian, chestnut colt (gelded), 2013, by Sea the Stars

In November 2013 Katoria was offered for sale at Goffs and bought for €100,000 by Kirsten Rausing's Lanwades Stud.

== Pedigree ==
Pedigree of Kastoria (IRE), chestnut mare, 2001
| Sire Selkirk (USA) 1988 | Sharpen Up (GB); 1969 | Atan | Native Dancer |
| Sire Selkirk (USA) 1988 | Sharpen Up (GB); 1969 | Atan | Mixed Marriage |
| Sire Selkirk (USA) 1988 | Sharpen Up (GB); 1969 | Rocchetta | Rockefella |
| Sire Selkirk (USA) 1988 | Sharpen Up (GB); 1969 | Rocchetta | Chambiges |
| Sire Selkirk (USA) 1988 | Annie Edge (IRE); 1980 | Nebbiolo | Yellow God |
| Sire Selkirk (USA) 1988 | Annie Edge (IRE); 1980 | Nebbiolo | Novara |
| Sire Selkirk (USA) 1988 | Annie Edge (IRE); 1980 | Friendly Court | Be Friendly |
| Sire Selkirk (USA) 1988 | Annie Edge (IRE); 1980 | Friendly Court | No Court |
| Dam Kassana (IRE) 1994 | Shernazar (IRE); 1981 | Busted | Crepello |
| Dam Kassana (IRE) 1994 | Shernazar (IRE); 1981 | Busted | Sans Le Sou |
| Dam Kassana (IRE) 1994 | Shernazar (IRE); 1981 | Sharmeen | Val de Loir |
| Dam Kassana (IRE) 1994 | Shernazar (IRE); 1981 | Sharmeen | Nasreen |
| Dam Kassana (IRE) 1994 | Kassiyda (IRE); 1986 | Mill Reef | Never Bend |
| Dam Kassana (IRE) 1994 | Kassiyda (IRE); 1986 | Mill Reef | Milan Mill |
| Dam Kassana (IRE) 1994 | Kassiyda (IRE); 1986 | Kadissya | Blushing Groom |
| Dam Kassana (IRE) 1994 | Kassiyda (IRE); 1986 | Kadissya | Kalkeen (Family: 5-e) |
