= Swiss Steel =

International steel company

Schmolz + Bickenbach AG
- Industry: Steel
- Founded: 1996
- Headquarters: Lucerne, Switzerland
- Key people: Clemens Iller (CEO); Matthias Wellhausen (CFO); Jens Alder
- Number of employees: >10,000 (2018)
- Website: swisssteel-group.com/en

Schmolz + Bickenbach AG (renamed since September 2020 as Swiss Steel Holding AG and Swiss Steel Group) is a listed steel group based in Lucerne / Switzerland. The group employs more than 10,000 people and generated revenues of €3.3 billion in 2018.

== Company history ==
Schmolz + Bickenbach was founded in 1919 by Arthur Schmolz and Oswald Bickenbach in Düsseldorf as a steel trading company. Since 1937, the company has been running under the double name.

In 2003, the family-run Schmolz + Bickenbach Group, which had previously been involved in steel processing and steel trading, through the leadership of Michael Storm took over the majority of the shares of Swiss Steel AG, a listed steel producer. Swiss steel was founded in Emmenbrücke in 1996. It was established as a holding company after the merger of the former competitors Von Moos Stahl and Von Roll Stahl, two Swiss steel producers. It was then joined by Von Moos Stahl AG's companies, Steeltec AG, the logistics company Panlog AG based in Emmenbrücke and Stahl Gerlafingen AG, based in Gerlafingen, which had emerged from Von Roll Holding.

In the following two years, the German steel producers Edelstahlwerke Südwestfalen (2004) and Edelstahl Witten-Krefeld (2005) were taken over. The two companies merged into Deutsche Edelstahlwerke in 2007. In 2006, 65% of the shares in Stahl Gerlafingen AG were sold. This was done in order to lead into a concentration on the production of high-quality steels in the long-product segment. In 2006 the French Ugitech Group, based in Ugine, was taken over.

In 2006, most of the operative parts of the parent company Schmolz + Bickenbach KG were integrated into Swiss Steel AG and renamed to Schmolz + Bickenbach AG. In 2007, the Swiss subsidiary, Von Moos Stahl, was then renamed Swiss Steel. At the beginning of February 2007, the American A. Finkl & Sons Group, based in Chicago, was purchased. With this move, the Schmolz + Bickenbach Group became the world's largest producer of tool steel. The Group is also the world leader in the production of stainless long products.

Within the scope of a capital increase, the shares of Schmolz + Bickenbach KG to the AG, fell in 2010 from 70% to almost 40%. On 23 December 2011, Storm resigned as President of the Board of Directors, after the discovery that he had misappropriated some €1.5 million, approximately CHF 1.83 million. In 2013, the company sued Michael Storm for a repayment of €9 million plus €1.4 million in interest.

In December 2012, high financial liabilities, which had risen to just under €903 million in connection with company acquisitions and a difficult steel economy, led to a tense financial situation.

In spring 2013, a possible capital increase was announced following a group loss of €157.9 million for the 2012 financial year. CEO Benedikt Niemeyer and CFO Axel Euchner left the company in June 2012 due to dissonances. The family shareholders around Michael Storm, which held almost 40% of the shares in spring 2013, initially rejected a capital increase since they had reduced their share.

In August 2013 Schmolz + Bickenbach KG allied itself with Russian oligarch Viktor Vekselberg and sold a share of 25.3% of its company to Renova Group, through its subsidiary Venetos. This sale resulted in a mandatory offer to the remaining shareholders, the price of which was below the market price, and therefore only received a very low acceptance rate. Nevertheless, the company agreed with the new major shareholder. An unusual General Meeting of Shareholders in September 2013, approved a capital increase of €430 million for Venetos and Schmolz + Bickenbach KG in accordance with their company's participation, and reassignment of the Board of Directors.

In the summer of 2015, the Group separated itself from a part of its distribution companies in Germany, Austria and Benelux. In October, Schmolz + Bickenbach relocated the Group headquarters from the existing headquarters in Düsseldorf to the new headquarters in Lucerne.

In February 2018, Schmolz + Bickenbach acquired the French steel manufacturer Ascometal.

A capital increase was announced in October 2019.

In December 2020, a capital increase of approx. €200 million was approved by an extraordinary General Meeting of Shareholders. A new Chairman as well as a new CEO were announced. However, Liwet Holding as an opposing shareholder blocked the registration of the new shares at the corresponding offices in Lucerne.

== Leadership ==
- Jens Alder, Chairman

== Shareholders ==
Schmolz + Bickenbach is listed on the SIX Swiss Stock Exchange. BigPoint Holding AG from Martin Haefner holds 49.6%, Liwet Holding AG 25%. A further 25.4% of the shares are spread out among others. Schmolz + Bickenbach Beteiligungs GmbH holds no more shares of the company.
