= Loughbrown Stakes =

Flat horse race in Ireland

Loughbrown Stakes
2026
Amelia Earhart	Abbotsford	Galileo Dame

Previous years
2025
Chally Chute	The Shunter	Bonnie Moon
2024
Dawn Rising	Lily Hart	The Shunter
2023
Falcon Eight	Echoes In Rain	Jesse Evans
2022
Emily Dickinson	Baron Samedi	Star Image
2021
Search For A Song	The Mediterranean	Silence Please

2020-2013
2020
Dawn Patrol	Barrington Court	Mighty Blue
2019
Kastasa	Cypress Creek	Capri
2018
Cypress Creek	Twilight Payment	Falcon Eight
2017
Renneti	Stars Over The Sea	Wild Irish Rose
2016
Twilight Payment	Forgotten Rules	Toe The Line
2015
Silwana	Toe The Line	Shu Lewis
2014
Toe The Line	Altesse	Kalann
2013
Eye of The Storm	Missunited	Leah Claire

The Loughbrown Stakes is a Group 3 flat horse race in Ireland open to thoroughbreds aged three years or older. It is run at the Curragh over a distance of 2 miles (3,219 metres), and it is scheduled to take place each year in September.

The race was first run in 2013 as a Listed race. Prior to that the name was associated with a seven furlongs race now replaced in the calendar by the Patton Stakes. It was upgraded to Group 3 status in 2017.

== Records ==
, Leading jockey (2 wins):

- Pat Smullen –Silwana (2015), Renneti (2017) Silwana (2015), Renneti (2017)
- Seamie Heffernan - Dawn Patrol (2020), Emily Dickinson (2022)

Leading trainer (5 wins):

- Aidan O'Brien – Eye of The Storm (2013), Cypress Creek (2018), Dawn Patrol (2020), Emily Dickinson (2022), Amelia Earhart (2026)

== Winners ==
Year	Winner	Age	Jockey	Trainer	Time
2013	Eye of The Storm	3	Joseph O'Brien	Aidan O'Brien	3:32.49
2014	Toe The Line	5	Fran Berry	John Kiely	3:25.45
2015	Silwana	4	Pat Smullen	Dermot Weld	3:33.66
2016	Twilight Payment	3	Kevin Manning	Jim Bolger	3:39.33
2017	Renneti (Note: The 2017 and 2018 runnings took place at Naas due to redevelopment work at The Curragh)	8	Pat Smullen	Willie Mullins	3:49.95
2018	Cypress Creek	3	Ryan Moore	Aidan O'Brien	3:32.19
2019	Kastasa	3	Andrew Slattery	Dermot Weld	3:42.78
2020	Dawn Patrol	3	Seamie Heffernan	Aidan O'Brien	3:35.70
2021	Search For A Song	5	Colin Keane	Dermot Weld	3:27.58
2022	Emily Dickinson	3	Seamie Heffernan	Aidan O'Brien	3:44.09
2023	Falcon Eight	8	Chris Hayes	Dermot Weld	3:53.44
2024	Dawn Rising	7	Dylan Browne McMonagle	Joseph O'Brien	3:46.48
2025	Chally Chute	7	Donagh O'Connor	Ross O'Sullivan	3:55.50
2026	Amelia Earhart	3	Gavin Ryan	Aidan O'Brien	3:45:28

== See also ==
- Horse racing in Ireland
- List of Irish flat horse races
