= Down Royal Mares Novice Hurdle =

Hurdle horse race in Ireland

Down Royal Mares Novice Hurdle
2026
Ash Hobbs	Switch From Diesel	Salsinha

Previous years
2025
Full Of Life	Carrigmoornaspruce	Korinthia
2024
Sansrisk	Royal Hollow	Stormalong
2023
Brighterdaysahead	Banntown Girl	Williamstowndancer
2022
Magical Zoe	Nikini	The Model Kingdom
2021
Impervious	Sit Down Lucy	Glan

2020-2011
2019
Daylight Katie	Jeremys Flame	Penny Out
2018
Sancta Simona	Holding Pattern	Make My Heart Fly
2017
Just Janice	Creation	Lesley Dawn
2016
Airlie Beach	Shattered Love	Field Robin
2015
Listen Dear	Colla Pier	Rathmuck Native
2014
Morning Run	Carrigmoorna Rock	Melbourne Lady
2013
Gambling Girl	Roja Dove	The Cookie Jar
2012
Top Madam	Thynetocatcher	Celtic Cailin
2011
Miss Nomer	Noras Fancy	Dazzling Susie

2010-2002
2010
Macville	Oilily	Araucaria
2009
Premier Victory	Grangeclare Gold	Rossdara
2008
Tramp Stamp	Afasheen	Dancera
2007
Megans Joy	My Valley	Ring Hill
2006
Swift Post	Smile Later	Sioux Falls
2005
Laetitia	High Priestess	No Sound
2004
Total Enjoyment	Sanghasta	Western Road
2003
Mariah Rollins	Penny Fiction	Definite Best
2002
Jolly Moonbeam	Baily Mist	Fluttery Dancer

The Down Royal Mares Novice Hurdle is a Grade 3 National Hunt hurdle race in Ireland which is open to mares aged four years or older. It is run at Down Royal over a distance of 2 miles and half a furlong (2 miles and 100 yards, or 3,310 metres). The race is for novice hurdlers, and it is scheduled to take place each year in late October or early November.

The race was first run in 2002 and was awarded Grade 3 status in 2007.

== Records ==
Leading jockey since 2002 (5 wins):

- Davy Russell – Laetitia (2012), Megans Joy (2007), Tramp Stamp (2008), Just Janice (2017), Daylight Katie (2019)

Leading trainer since 2002 (4 wins):

- Willie Mullins - Morning Run (2014), Listen Dear (2015), Airlie Beach (2016), Sancta Simona (2018)

== Winners ==
Year	Winner	Age	Jockey	Trainer
2002	Jolly Moonbeam	5	P G Hourigan	Michael Hourigan
2003	Mariah Rollins	5	David Casey	Pat Fahy
2004	Total Enjoyment	5	Ruby Walsh	Thomas Cooper
2005	Laetitia	5	Davy Russell	Charles Byrnes
2006	Grangeclare Lark	5	Paddy Flood	Dessie Hughes
2007	Megans Joy	5	Davy Russell	Colm Murphy
2008	Tramp Stamp	4	Davy Russell	Matthieu Palussiere
2009	Premier Victory	5	John Cullen	Tom Hogan
2010	Macville	6	Paul Townend	Patrick Neville
2011	Miss Nomer	4	Barry Geraghty	Edward O'Grady
2012	Top Madam	6	Davy Condon	Donal Coffey
2013	Gambling Girl	4	Robbie Power	Jessica Harrington
2014	Morning Run	5	Ruby Walsh	Willie Mullins
2015	Listen Dear	5	Ruby Walsh	Willie Mullins
2016	Airlie Beach	6	Ruby Walsh	Willie Mullins
2017	Just Janice	5	Davy Russell	John Kiely
2018	Sancta Simona	5	Barry Geraghty	Willie Mullins
2019	Daylight Katie	6	Davy Russell	Gordon Elliott
2020	Skyace	5	Jody McGarvey	Shark Hanlon
2021	Impervious	5	Brian Hayes	Colm Murphy
2022	Magical Zoe	4	Adrian Heskin	Henry De Bromhead
2023	Brighterdaysahead	4	Jack Kennedy	Gordon Elliott
2024	Sansrisk	5	Donagh Meyler	Philip Dempsey
2025	Full Of Life	6	Darragh O'Keeffe	Henry De Bromhead
2026	Ash Hobbs	5	Darragh O'Keeffe	Henry De Bromhead

== See also ==
- Horse racing in Ireland
- List of Irish National Hunt races
