= Trusted Partner =

American-bred Thoroughbred racehorse

- Sire: Affirmed
- Grandsire: Exclusive Native
- Dam: Talking Picture
- Damsire: Speak John
- Sex: Mare
- Foaled: 22 May 1985
- Country: United States
- Colour: Chestnut
- Breeder: Moyglare Stud
- Owner: Moyglare Stud; Walter Haefner
- Trainer: Dermot Weld; Victor J. Nickerson
- Record: 8: 3-1-0

Major wins
- C L Weld Park Stakes (1987); Irish 1000 Guineas (1988)

Trusted Partner (foaled 22 May 1985) was an American-bred, Irish-trained Thoroughbred racehorse and broodmare. She showed great promise as a two-year-old in 1987 when she won both of her races including the C L Weld Park Stakes and won the Irish 1000 Guineas on her three-year-old debut. She was beaten in her three remaining European starts and had no success when sent to race in America in 1989. After her retirement from racing she became a very successful broodmare.

== Background ==
Trusted Partner was a light chestnut mare with a broad white blaze and white socks on her front legs bred in Kentucky by Walter Haefner's Moyglare Stud. The filly was sent to race in Europe where she was trained by Dermot Weld in Ireland. She was officially described as being owned by Moyglare Stud when racing in Europe and by Haefner after her transfer to the United States.

She was from the fifth crop of foals sired by the outstanding American racehorse Affirmed who won the Triple Crown in 1978. Her dam Talking Picture was a granddaughter of the American broodmare Banta, making her a close relative of Big Spruce.

== Racing career ==
=== 1987: two-year-old season ===
Trusted Partner began her racing career in a one-mile maiden race at the Curragh and won by five lengths from twenty-five opponents. In October she was moved up in class for the C L Weld Park Stakes over seven furlongs at Phoenix Park Racecourse and won by four lengths from Impressive Lady. At the end of the year she was rated the fourth-best two-year-old filly in Ireland, four pounds behind Flutter Away, and was described as "very promising" by Timeform.

=== 1988: three-year-old season ===
Trusted Partner was ridden in all of her races in 1988 by Mick Kinane. On her first appearance as a three-year-old she was stepped up in class to contest the Irish 1000 Guineas over one mile at the Curragh on 21 May and started at odds of 10/1 in a sixteen-runner field with the French-trained Bitooh (winner of the Critérium de Maisons-Laffitte) started favorite. After being restrained towards the rear of the field Trusted Partner took the lead approaching the final furlong and won by two lengths from Dancing Goddess.

In June the filly was stepped up in distance for the Prix de Diane over 2000 metres at Chantilly Racecourse and lost her unbeaten record as she finished unplaced behind the François Boutin-trained Resless Kara. On 4 September she was matched against male opposition and older fillies and mares for the first time in the Phoenix Champion Stakes and finished seventh of the nine runners behind Indian Skimmer. A week after her defeat at Phoenix Park, Trusted Partner started 3/1 favourite for the Matron Stakes at the Curragh and finished second to the British-trained Llyn Gwynant.

=== 1989: four-year-old season ===
In 1989 Trusted Partner was sent to race in California where she was trained by Victor J. Nickerson. She made only two appearances and made little impact, finishing fifth in the Buena Vista Handicap and eighth in the Santa Ana Handicap, both races taking place at Santa Anita Park in April.

== Breeding record ==
At the end of her racing career, Trusted Partner was retired to become a broodmare for the Moyglare Stud. She produced at least thirteen foals an eleven winners between 1990 and 2005. Her offspring included:

- Brave Raider, a chestnut colt (later gelded), foaled in 1990, sired by Dixieland Band. Won three races.
- Tackling Reality, colt, 1991, by Soviet Star. Winner in Italy.
- Archive Footage, bay colt (later gelded), 1992, by Sadler's Wells. Won eight races including the Ladbroke Hurdle.
- Trust In Luck, chestnut filly, 1993, by Nashwan. Won one race.
- Act of Defiance, colt, 1994, Caerleon. Won six races.
- Blend of Pace, bay filly, 1996, by Sadler's Wells. Won one race. Dam of Indian Pace (Galway Hurdle).
- Dress to Thrill, bay filly, 1999, by Danehill. Won six races including Sun Chariot Stakes and Matron Stakes.
- Foolish Thought, bay colt (later gelded), 2000, by Green Desert. Won one race.
- Wow the Critics, bay filly, 2001, by Danehill. Failed to win in two races.
- Striking Force, bay colt (later gelded), 2002, by Danehill. Won five races.
- Polished Gem, bay filly, 2003, by Danehill. Won one race. Dam of Free Eagle, Custom Cut (Sandown Mile), Sapphire (British Champions Fillies' and Mares' Stakes) and Kyprios (Ascot Gold Cup)
- Battle in Hand, bay colt, 2004, by Rock of Gibraltar. Won one race.
- Myth and Magic, bay filly, 2005, by Namid. Unraced.

== Pedigree ==
Pedigree of Trusted Partner (USA), chestnut mare, 1985
| Sire Affirmed (USA) 1975 | Exclusive Native (USA); 1965 | Raise a Native | Native Dancer |
| Sire Affirmed (USA) 1975 | Exclusive Native (USA); 1965 | Raise a Native | Raise You |
| Sire Affirmed (USA) 1975 | Exclusive Native (USA); 1965 | Exclusive | Shut Out |
| Sire Affirmed (USA) 1975 | Exclusive Native (USA); 1965 | Exclusive | Good Example |
| Sire Affirmed (USA) 1975 | Won't Tell You (USA); 1962 | Crafty Admiral | Fighting Fox |
| Sire Affirmed (USA) 1975 | Won't Tell You (USA); 1962 | Crafty Admiral | Admiral's Lady |
| Sire Affirmed (USA) 1975 | Won't Tell You (USA); 1962 | Scarlet Ribbon | Volcanic |
| Sire Affirmed (USA) 1975 | Won't Tell You (USA); 1962 | Scarlet Ribbon | Native Valor |
| Dam Talking Picture (USA) 1971 | Speak John (USA); 1958 | Prince John | Princequillo (IRE) |
| Dam Talking Picture (USA) 1971 | Speak John (USA); 1958 | Prince John | Not Afraid |
| Dam Talking Picture (USA) 1971 | Speak John (USA); 1958 | Nuit de Folies (FR) | Tornado |
| Dam Talking Picture (USA) 1971 | Speak John (USA); 1958 | Nuit de Folies (FR) | Folle Nuit |
| Dam Talking Picture (USA) 1971 | Poster Girl (USA); 1960 | Nasrullah (GB) | Nearco (ITY) |
| Dam Talking Picture (USA) 1971 | Poster Girl (USA); 1960 | Nasrullah (GB) | Mumtaz Begum (FR) |
| Dam Talking Picture (USA) 1971 | Poster Girl (USA); 1960 | Banta | Some Chance |
| Dam Talking Picture (USA) 1971 | Poster Girl (USA); 1960 | Banta | Bourtai (Family 9-f) |
