= Martin Haefner =

Swiss billionaire

- Born: 1954 (age 71–72)
- Education: ETH Zurich
- Board member of: AMAG, Swiss Steel Group
- Spouse: married
- Parent: Walter Haefner
- Relatives: Eva Maria Bucher-Haefner (sister)

Martin Walter Haefner (born 1954) is a Swiss billionaire. As of 2026, Forbes estimates his personal net worth at $4.9 billion.

== Career ==
Haefner studied mathematics at the ETH Zurich. For many years he worked as a high-school teacher. At the age of 50, his father put him in charge of AMAG, the family-owned importer of Volkswagen, Audi, Skoda and SEAT cars into Switzerland. After the death of their father, Haefner and his sister Eva Maria Bucher-Haefner divided 2018 their heritage such that Martin Haefner became sole owner of AMAG. Through the sale of their participation in the US software company CA Technologies, funds were available for additional investments. Haefner became the main shareholder of Schmolz + Bickenbach, now Swiss Steel, a steel producer with factories in several countries. He became a major donor of the ETH Foundation.

== Honors ==
- 2013: Honorary Councillor, ETH Zurich

== Personal life ==
He is the son of Walter Haefner. When his father died in 2012, he was the world's oldest billionaire at the age of 101 and had a net worth of US$4.3 billion.

He is married and lives in Horw, Canton of Lucerne.
