= Bondi Beach (horse) =

Irish-bred Thoroughbred racehorse

- Racing silks of Derrick Smith
- Sire: Galileo
- Grandsire: Sadler's Wells
- Dam: One Moment In Time
- Damsire: Danehill
- Sex: Stallion
- Foaled: 23 February 2012
- Country: Ireland
- Colour: Bay
- Breeder: One Moment In Time Syndicate
- Owner: Derrick Smith, Mrs John Magnier, Michael Tabor
- Trainer: Aidan O'Brien
- Record: 15: 4-3-2
- Earnings: £289,375

Major wins
- Curragh Cup (2015); Vintage Crop Stakes (2016); Martin Molony Stakes (2016)

Bondi Beach (foaled 23 February 2012) is an Irish Thoroughbred racehorse. Unraced as a juvenile, the colt emerged as a top-class stayer in 2015 with a win in the Curragh Cup. He was awarded the St Leger on the disqualification of Simple Verse but lost the race following an appeal.

== Background ==
Bondi Beach is a bay stallion bred in Ireland by the One Moment in Time syndicate, a breeding organisation associated with the Coolmore Stud. He was sired by Galileo, who won the Derby, Irish Derby and King George VI and Queen Elizabeth Stakes in 2001. Galileo is now one of the world's leading stallions and has been champion sire of Great Britain and Ireland five times. His other progeny include Cape Blanco, Frankel, Golden Lilac, Nathaniel, New Approach, Rip Van Winkle and Ruler of the World. Bondi Beach's dam One Moment In Time was an unraced daughter of the Moyglare Stud Stakes runner-up Hotelgenie Dot Com.

Like many Coolmore horses, Bondi Beach was sent into training with Aidan O'Brien at Ballydoyle.

== Racing career ==
=== 2015: three-year-old season ===
Bondi Beach began his racing career in a maiden race over one and a half miles on heavy ground at Leopardstown Racecourse on 10 May in which he was ridden by Seamie Heffernan and started at odds of 7/1 in a nine-runner field. He tracked the leaders before moving up into second place in the straight, caught the long-time leader Bantry Bay (also trained by O'Brien) in the final strides and won by a short head. Over the same course and distance (but on much firmer ground) he started 9/4 second favourite for the Listed King George V Cup 5 June. After being restrained at the rear of the field by Emmet McNamara he stayed on well in the closing stages to dead heat for second with Morning Mix, half a length behind the Dermot Weld-trained Radanpour.

At the Curragh Racecourse on 28 June Bondi Beach was stepped up in class and distance for the Group Three Curragh Cup over one mile and six furlongs in which he was matched against older horses. Ridden by Heffernan he started the 7/1 fourth choice in a six-runner field behind Forgotten Rules (winner of the British Champions Long Distance Cup), Order of St George (from the Ballydoyle stable) and Panama Hat. After racing in second place behind Forgotten Rules he moved up dispute the lead approaching the final furlong at which point Heffernan dropped his whip. He was overtaken by Order of St George but rallied to defeat his more fancied stablemate by a short head.

Bondi Beach was then sent to England and dropped back in distance for the Great Voltigeur Stakes over one and a half miles at York Racecourse 19 August and was made the 11/4 favourite ahead of Storm The Stars, who had finished third in The Derby, the previously undefeated Tashaar and the King Edward VII Stakes winner Balios. He was restrained by Joseph O'Brien towards the rear of the field before making progress in the straight. He moved alongside Storm The Stars a furlong out but was hampered when the leader hung to the left in the closing stages and finished second, beaten half a length. Following an enquiry by the racecourse stewards the result was allowed to stand. After the race Michael Tabor said "Michael Tabor was thrilled with his colt's effort. "The winner has got the form in the book but we've run well. Bondi Beach has run a good race and deserves to take his chance in the Leger... I would say he will be our number-one hope".

On 12 September, Bondi Beach (ridden by Colm O'Donoghue) and Storm The Stars started the 2/1 joint favourites for the 239th running of the St Leger at Doncaster Racecourse. The other runners were the Ballyroan Stakes winner Fields of Athenry, the filly Simple Verse (Lillie Langtry Stakes), Vengeur Masque from France and the outsiders Medrano and Proposed. Fields of Athenry set the pace from Storm The Stars and Simple Verse with Bondi Beach in fourth. As the field entered the straight, Bondi Beach began to make progress on the outside as Storm The Stars overhauled Fields of Athenry whilst Simple Verse (ridden by Andrea Atzeni) appeared trapped on the inside rail. Entering the last quarter mile Bondi Beach was badly bumped when Atzeni switched the filly to the right. Simple Verse overtook Storm The Stars but Bondi Beach recovered his momentum and renewed his challenge only to be hampered for a second time when the filly hung to the right again in the final furlong. Simple Verse crossed the line a head in front of Bondi Beach, but after a lengthy stewards' inquiry the placings were reversed, and the race was awarded to the Irish colt. O'Donoghue told the stewards "Has an incident occurred? Yes. Has it took me off a straight course? Yes... my horse has received a severe bump which has obviously taken his breath, knocked him off his stride and his rhythm... he's suffered interference and he's been beaten a head on the line". Aidan O'Brien commented "It was messy down the straight. He was unlucky at York and he got two proper bumps that day and got brought right across the track. That's the way it goes, some days it falls for you and some days it doesn’t".

The connections of Simple Verse lodged an appeal against the result, and the decision was reversed in favour of Simple Verse on 23 September.

On 13 October 2015, Bondi Beach was confirmed to run in the Melbourne Cup by trainer Aidan O'Brien with jockey Brett Prebble taking the ride. On 3 November, Bondi Beach was sent off at odds of 16/1 for the 2015 Melbourne Cup but could only manage to finish 16th of 24 runners behind Prince of Penzance.

Bondi Beach competed in the following two Melbourne Cups and in 2016 he finished 13th and in 2017 he came in 22nd position.

In 2018 Bondi Beach was sold by his owner Lloyd Williams for the sum of A$25,000 to Sydney trainer Richard Litt.

After a 488-day spell between runs, Bondi Beach took part in the 2019 Canberra Cup where he was beaten 26 lengths into last placing. He has since been retired from racing.

== Pedigree ==
Pedigree of Bondi Beach (IRE), bay colt, 2012
Sire Galileo (IRE) 1998	Sadler's Wells (USA); 1981	Northern Dancer	Nearctic
Sire Galileo (IRE) 1998	Sadler's Wells (USA); 1981	Northern Dancer	Natalma
Sire Galileo (IRE) 1998	Sadler's Wells (USA); 1981	Fairy Bridge	Bold Reason
Sire Galileo (IRE) 1998	Sadler's Wells (USA); 1981	Fairy Bridge	Special
Sire Galileo (IRE) 1998	Urban Sea (USA) ch. 1989	Miswaki	Mr. Prospector
Sire Galileo (IRE) 1998	Urban Sea (USA) ch. 1989	Miswaki	Hopespringseternal
Sire Galileo (IRE) 1998	Urban Sea (USA) ch. 1989	Allegretta	Lombard
Sire Galileo (IRE) 1998	Urban Sea (USA) ch. 1989	Allegretta	Anatevka
Dam One Moment In Time (IRE) 2003	Danehill (USA); 1986	Danzig	Northern Dancer
Dam One Moment In Time (IRE) 2003	Danehill (USA); 1986	Danzig	Pas de Nom
Dam One Moment In Time (IRE) 2003	Danehill (USA); 1986	Razyana	His Majesty
Dam One Moment In Time (IRE) 2003	Danehill (USA); 1986	Razyana	Spring Adieu
Dam One Moment In Time (IRE) 2003	Hotelgenie Dot Com (GB); 1998	Selkirk	Sharpen Up
Dam One Moment In Time (IRE) 2003	Hotelgenie Dot Com (GB); 1998	Selkirk	Annie Edge
Dam One Moment In Time (IRE) 2003	Hotelgenie Dot Com (GB); 1998	Birch Creek	Carwhite
Dam One Moment In Time (IRE) 2003	Hotelgenie Dot Com (GB); 1998	Birch Creek	Deed (Family 14-c)

- Bondi Beach is inbred 3 x 4 to Northern Dancer, meaning that this stallion appears in both the third and fourth generations of his pedigree.
