= AMAG Group AG =

Swiss car retail company

- Company type: Automobile importer and dealer / energy solutions
- Industry: Automobile Energy
- Founded: January 3, 1945; 81 years ago
- Headquarters: Cham, Switzerland
- Key people: Martin Haefner (chairman); Helmut Ruhl (CEO AMAG Group AG)
- Products: Automobile
- Revenue: CHF 5.0 billion (2025)
- Website: www.amag-group.ch

AMAG Group AG is a Swiss corporate group primarily active in the automotive trade. Since September 2019, the administration of the entire AMAG group has been based in Cham in the canton of Zug, after relocating from Utoquai 49 in Zurich, where the group had been based since its foundation. The group employs around 7500 people and generated revenue of CHF 5.0 billion in 2025. The group is owned by the private holding company BigPoint Holding AG, in turn owned by Martin Haefner.

== AMAG headquarters in Cham ==
The core business of the AMAG Group is the company AMAG Automobil- und Motoren AG founded in 1945 by Walter Haefner and based in Zurich. On 29 April 1948, the company signed an import agreement with Volkswagen, and then again with Porsche in 1951, both of which continue to form the basis of the car import business operated by AMAG. In May 2008, AMAG ceased importing Porsche vehicles, as the subsidiary Porsche Swiss Ltd asserted its right to the trade. However, AMAG remains the Porsche brand's biggest retail partner and, according to information provided by the company itself, is the largest Porsche retail organisation in Switzerland with 6 sales and service locations and the fourth-largest Porsche dealer in the world.

From 1949-72, assembly of different types of vehicles took place at "Automontage Schinznach AG" in Schinznach Bad for Chrysler Corporation (Chrysler, DeSoto, Dodge, and Plymouth), Standard, Studebaker, and VW (Karmann-Ghia).

The AMAG Group comprises AMAG Import Ltd (Importer for Switzerland and Fürstentum Liechtenstein for Volkswagen, Audi, Seat, Skoda, Cupra and Volkswagen CV); AMAG Automobil und Motoren AG, which operates over 90 garages and a Bentley dealership in Cham; AMAG First Ltd (Porsche); AMAG Leasing AG (leasing business); AMAG Services AG (Europcar car hire service, valet parking at Swiss airports and chauffeur services); and AMAG Parking Ltd. Since 2018, AMAG has been a co-owner and, since 2025, the majority owner of autoSense, the solution for digital vehicle networking and charging solutions, and since 2019 it has been offering a car subscription model with Clyde. Clyde now focuses on subscriptions for electric vehicles. As an absolute novelty, the subscription price also includes the cost of charging at home and on the road. It is also a partner in the Swiss Startup Factory. Since January 2021, mobilog AG has been taking over AMAG's logistics tasks. AMAG is one of the founding members of the industry association Swiss Alliance for Collaborative Mobility (CHACOMO).

In 2022, the AMAG Group acquired the energy services company Helion and founded Helion Energy AG. Since 2023, it has held a stake in the Danish company Holo A/S, an operator of autonomous vehicle fleets.

As of the new vehicle registrations in 2025, the market shares of the key AMAG brands are as follows: Volkswagen: 11.0%, ŠKODA: 9.5% Audi: 7.4%, and Seat/Cupra: 4.2%. Eva Maria Bucher-Haefner, the daughter of AMAG founder Walter Haefner, who died in 2012, sold her 50% share to her brother in December 2018 and stepped down from the boards of directors of the AMAG Group companies. The AMAG Group is therefore owned solely by Martin Haefner. The company's former headquarters at Zurich's Utoquai is owned by Eva Maria Bucher-Haefner; the AMAG garage and dealership situated on the ground floor operate there as tenants.

== Logo ==
Until 2013, the company logo symbolised an Auto Union racing car Type A driving towards the viewer. The vehicle's body formed the centre, with the front tyres and their drum brakes and axes to the left and right. In September 2013, AMAG completely overhauled its branding and thus also its logo. The company now uses plain lettering as its logo.
