= Down Royal Racecourse =

Horse racing venue near Lisburn, Northern Ireland

Coordinates: 54.491°N 6.120°W

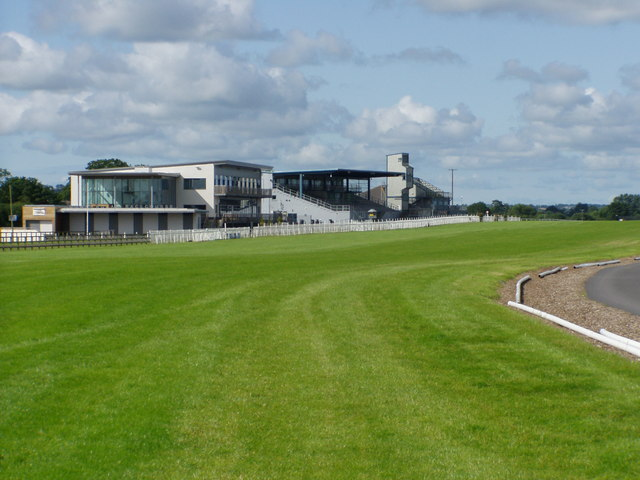
View towards the spectator stands

Down Royal Racecourse is a horse racing venue near Lisburn in Northern Ireland. The most valuable race run there is the BetVictor Champion Chase, run at the Northern Ireland Festival of racing in November. The most valuable flat race to be run there annually is the Ulster Derby.

Racing has been taking place on the current course, at Maze near Lisburn, since the early 18th Century on land donated by Arthur Hill, 1st Marquess of Downshire, but the history of Down Royal goes further back to 1685 when King James II issued a Royal Charter and formed the Down Royal Corporation of Horse Breeders. In 1750 King George II donated £100 to run King's Plate and to the present day a race named His Majesty's Plate is run in July over 1 mile 5 furlongs with the prize money contributed to by the Privy Purse.

Although actually in the United Kingdom, racing at Down Royal comes under the authority of Horse Racing Ireland as horse-racing in the British Isles is divided on a Great Britain / All-Ireland basis.

== Notable races ==
| Month | DOW | Race Name | Type | Grade | Distance | Age/Sex |
|---|---|---|---|---|---|---|
| June | Friday | His Majesty's Plate | Flat | Listed | 1m 6f | 4yo+ |
| June | Saturday | Ulster Derby | Flat | Handicap | 1m 4f 190y | 3yo |
| November | Friday | Down Royal Mares Novice Hurdle | Hurdle | Grade 3 | 2m | 4yo + m |
| November | Friday | Jezki Hurdle | Hurdle | Grade 3 | 2m | 4yo + |
| November | Saturday | BetVictor Champion Chase | Chase | Grade 1 | 3m | 5yo + |
| November | Saturday | Skymas Chase | Chase | Grade 2 | 2m 4f | 5yo + |
