= Walter Haefner =

Swiss businessman and thoroughbred racehorse owner and breeder

- Born: 13 September 1910; Zürich, Switzerland
- Died: 19 June 2012 (aged 101)
- Occupations: Businessman: automobiles/computers Racehorse breeder
- Children: Eva Maria Bucher-Haefner; Martin Haefner

Walter Haefner (13 September 1910 – 19 June 2012) was a Swiss businessman. He was also a thoroughbred racehorse owner and breeder in Ireland. According to Forbes, he was ranked as the 248th billionaire in 2012, with an estimated fortune of $4.3 billion.

== Biography ==
Haefner was born in the Zurich in 1910. He was one of seven children of a Protestant missionary and went on study business economics.

He worked for Shell before joining the Swiss division of General Motors Corporation. During World World II, he took over AMAG Automobil- und Motoren and began adapting cars to be powered by wood gas rather than fuel. Haefner introduced Volkswagens to Switzerland and imported 1,680 Beetles by 1948.

In 1960, he opened the Automation Center AG. Recognizing the important role a computer could play in his growing chain of dealerships, in 1957 Haefner became one of the first in Switzerland to import an IBM system for business use. He sold the data-processing firm in 1968 to University Computing.

In 1976, he expanded operations to the United States and, after merging his company Computer Associates International, Inc. in 1987, Haefner remained CA's largest individual shareholder until his death. He continued to own AMAG Automobil- und Motoren, a highly successful Swiss automobile dealership chain. Until his death, at age 101, he was the oldest person worth more than a billion dollars.

=== Moyglare Stud Farm ===
In 1962, Haefner purchased the 440-acre (1.8 km^{2}) Moyglare Stud Farm near the town of Maynooth, County Kildare, Ireland. His thoroughbred racehorses have won numerous Group One and British Classic Races in England, Ireland, and France as well as important races at other venues in Europe, North America, Japan, Australia, and Hong Kong.

Through horse racing, Haefner met art dealer Daniel Wildenstein, who was himself a successful horse breeder. In the mid-1960s, Haefner acquired his first paintings from Wildenstein's New York branch.

In the United States Moyglare's racing stable was handled by trainer Christophe Clement while Dermot K. Weld is the trainer in charge of its European operations. In 1991 Weld became the first European-based trainer to win a race in Hong Kong when Moyglare's colt Additional Risk won the Hong Kong Invitational Bowl at Sha Tin Racecourse.

In 1975, the Curragh Racecourse honored Moyglare's contribution to Irish racing by naming a Group I race the Moyglare Stud Stakes. In 1988 Trinity College, Dublin awarded Haefner an honorary doctorate for his services to the Irish bloodstock industry and for his contributions to education in Ireland.

Selective major race wins by some of the horses owned or bred by Moyglare Stud Farm:

- Additional Risk - Hong Kong Bowl
- Again Tomorrow - Premio Parioli
- Assert - Prix du Jockey Club, Irish Derby Stakes
- Bikala - Prix du Jockey Club, Prix Ganay
- Brief Truce - St. James's Palace Stakes
- Carwhite - Prix d'Ispahan
- Dance Design - Irish Oaks, Pretty Polly Stakes (2), Tattersalls Gold Cup
- Definite Article - Tattersalls Gold Cup, National Stakes
- Dress To Thrill - Matriarch Stakes, Matron Stakes, Sun Chariot Stakes
- Go And Go - Belmont Stakes
- Market Booster - Pretty Polly Stakes, Bayerisches Zuchtrennen
- Media Puzzle - Melbourne Cup
- Refuse To Bend - 2,000 Guineas, National Stakes, Eclipse Stakes, Queen Anne Stakes
- Relaxed Gesture - Canadian International Stakes
- Stanerra - Japan Cup
- Trusted Partner - Irish 1,000 Guineas
- Twilight Agenda - won Meadowlands Cup, San Pasqual Handicap, Del Mar Breeders' Cup Mile. Career earnings of US$2,177,843

Haefner's daughter, Eva Maria Bucher-Haefner, owns Moyglare Stud. As of November 2015, Forbes estimated her net worth at US$2.4 billion. She is married with two children and lives in Zurich.

== See also ==
- List of billionaires
