= Joseph Patrick O'Brien =

Irish jockey and horse trainer

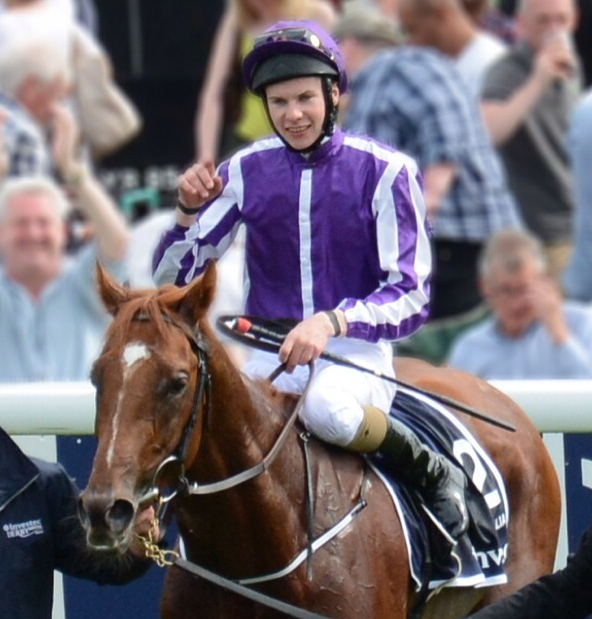
- Joseph O'Brien after winning the Epsom Derby on Australia

Personal information
- Born: 23 May 1993 (age 33)
- Occupations: Jockey, Trainer

Horse racing career
- Sport: Horse racing

Significant horses
- St Nicholas Abbey; Camelot; Australia

1000 Guineas (0)

2000 Guineas (1)
2012
Camelot	French Fifteen	Hermival

Derby (2)
2012
Camelot	Main Sequence	Astrology
2014
Australia	Kingston Hill	Romsdal

Oaks (0)

St Leger (1)
2013
Leading Light	Talent	Galileo Rock

Joseph Patrick O'Brien (born 23 May 1993) is an Irish horse racing trainer and former flat racing jockey. He is the son of trainer Aidan O'Brien. In 2012 he rode Camelot to win the 2,000 Guineas, the 2012 Epsom Derby and the Irish Derby.

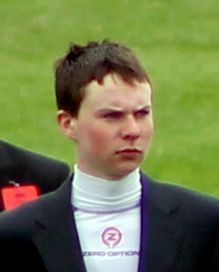
Joseph O'Brien before riding Camelot in the 2012 Epsom Derby.

== Riding career ==
O'Brien won a bronze medal at the 2009 European Pony Championships and was one of three jockeys who shared the Irish champion apprentice jockeys' title in 2010. He rode his first winner on Johann Zoffany, trained by his father, at Leopardstown Racecourse on 28 May 2009 and gained his first classic success when Roderic O'Connor won the 2011 Irish 2,000 Guineas. In 2012 Aidan and Joseph, 19, became the first father-son/trainer-jockey combination to win The Derby, with Camelot.

He was Irish Champion Jockey in 2012 with 87 winners. In October 2013, O'Brien broke a 20-year-old record with a treble at Navan to get his 117th winner of the season and beat the previous record set by Mick Kinane. He finished the 2013 season with 126 winners and retained his Irish Champion Jockey title.

In March 2016 O'Brien announced that he would be stepping down from race-riding to concentrate on his new career as a trainer.

== Training career ==
O'Brien began his training career at Owning Hill, County Kilkenny. He made an immediate impact when Intricately, ridden by his younger brother Donnacha, won the Moyglare Stud Stakes in 2016. He went on to win the Melbourne Cup with Rekindling in 2017 and with Twilight Payment in 2020; the Irish Derby with Latrobe in 2018; and the Pretty Polly Stakes with Iridessa in 2019. He also trained several good winners under National Hunt rules.

== Major wins as a jockey ==
(Republic of Ireland) Ireland

- Irish 2,000 Guineas – (3) – Roderic O'Connor (2011), Power (2012), Magician (2013)
- Moyglare Stud Stakes – (1) – Maybe (2011)
- Tattersalls Gold Cup – (1) – So You Think (2012)
- Irish Derby - (2) - Camelot (2012), Australia (2014)
- Irish St. Leger - (1) - Order Of St George (2015)
- Vincent O'Brien National Stakes - (2) - Gleneagles (2014), Air Force Blue (2015)
- Phoenix Stakes - (2) - Dick Whittington (2014), Air Force Blue (2015)

France

- Grand Prix de Paris - (1) - Imperial Monarch (2012)

(United Kingdom) Great Britain

- 2,000 Guineas – (1) – Camelot (2012)
- Ascot Gold Cup - (1) - Leading Light (2014)
- Coronation Cup – (2) – St Nicholas Abbey (2012, 2013)
- Derby Stakes – (2) – Camelot (2012), Australia (2014)
- Fillies' Mile - (1) - Together Forever (2014)
- International Stakes - (2) - Declaration of War (2013), Australia (2014)
- Prince of Wales's Stakes - (1) - So You Think (2012)
- Queen Anne Stakes - (1) - Declaration of War (2013)
- Queen Elizabeth II Stakes - (1) - Excelebration (2012)
- Racing Post Trophy – (2) – Camelot (2011), Kingsbarns (2012)
- St. Leger - (1) - Leading Light (2013)

United Arab Emirates

- Dubai Sheema Classic - (1) - St Nicholas Abbey (2013)

United States

- Breeders' Cup Turf – (1) – St Nicholas Abbey (2011)

== Major wins as a trainer ==
(Republic of Ireland) Ireland

- Irish Derby - (1) - Latrobe (2018)
- Irish Oaks - (1) - Johanna Walsh (2026)
- Irish St. Leger - (1) - Al Riffa (2025)
- Moyglare Stud Stakes – (1) – Intricately (2016)
- National Stakes – (4) – Thunder Moon (2020), Al Riffa (2022), Scorthy Champ (2024), Folsom Blues (2026)
- Matron Stakes – (1) – Iridessa (2019)
- Pretty Polly Stakes - (2) - Iridessa (2019), Thundering Nights (2021)
- Irish Gold Cup - (1) - Edwulf (2018)
- Paddy's Reward Club Chase - (2) Solness (2024, 2025)
- Punchestown Champion Chase - (1) - Banbridge (2024)
- Racing Post Novice Chase - (1) - Le Richebourg (2018)
- Arkle Novice Chase - (1) - Le Richebourg (2019)
- Golden Cygnet Novice Hurdle - (1) - Tower Bridge (2018)
- Spring Juvenile Hurdle - (2) - Sir Erec (2019), A Wave of the Sea (2020)
- Drinmore Novice Chase - (1) - Fakir D’oudairies (2019)
- Christmas Hurdle - (2) - Home By The Lee (2022, 2024)
- Dublin Chase - (1) - Solness (2025)
- Tattersalls Ireland Novice Hurdle - (1) Talk The Talk (2026)

Australia

- Melbourne Cup – (2) – Rekindling (2017), Twilight Payment (2020)
- Cox Plate - (1) - State Of Rest (2021)

France

- Critérium de Saint-Cloud - (1) - Tennessee Stud (2024)
- Prix Ganay - (1) - State Of Rest (2022)
- Prix Marcel Boussac - (1) - Green Empress (2026)
- Prix Saint-Alary - (1) - Above The Curve (2022)

(United Kingdom) Great Britain

- Epsom Oaks - (1) - Thundering On (2026)
- Fillies' Mile - (2) - Iridessa (2018), Pretty Gorgeous (2020)
- Prince of Wales's Stakes - (1) - State Of Rest (2022)
- St Leger Stakes - (2) - Galileo Chrome (2020), Highwayman (2026)
- Melling Chase - (2) - Fakir D'oudairies (2021, 2022)
- Ascot Chase - (1) - Fakir D'oudairies (2022)
- Liverpool Hurdle - (1) - Home By The Lee (2026)
- Manifesto Novices' Chase - (1) - Banbridge (2023)
- King George VI Chase - (1) - Banbridge (2024)
- Sefton Novices' Hurdle - (1) Zeus Power (2026)
- Stayers' Hurdle - (1) - Home By The Lee (2026)

United States

- Breeders' Cup Filly & Mare Turf - (1) - Iridessa (2019)
- Saratoga Derby Invitational Stakes - (1) - State Of Rest (2021)

Germany

- Grosser Preis von Berlin - (1) - Al Riffa (2024)

== Year-end charts ==
Chart (2013–present)	Peak position
National Earnings List for Jockeys 2013	68

== See also ==
- List of jockeys

Sporting positions
Preceded by Johnny Murtagh	Ballydoyle retained jockey 2010-15	Succeeded by Ryan Moore
