= Favourable Terms =

British-bred Thoroughbred racehorse

- Sire: Selkirk
- Grandsire: Sharpen Up
- Dam: Fatefully
- Damsire: Private Account
- Sex: Mare
- Foaled: 4 March 2000
- Country: United Kingdom
- Colour: Bay
- Breeder: Gainsborough Stud
- Owner: Maktoum Al Maktoum; Alia Al Maktoum
- Trainer: Michael Stoute
- Record: 11: 6-1-0
- Earnings: £326,655

Major wins
- Distaff Stakes (2003); Matron Stakes (2003); Windsor Forest Stakes (2004); Nassau Stakes (2004); Sceptre Stakes (2005)

Favourable Terms (foaled 4 March 2000) is a British Thoroughbred racehorse and broodmare. Unraced as a two-year-old, she showed very good form as a three-year-old in 2003 when she won three of her five races including the Distaff Stakes in England and the Matron Stakes in Ireland. In the following year she reached her peak with wins in the Windsor Forest Stakes and the Nassau Stakes. Her later career was compromised by back problems but she did win the Sceptre Stakes in 2005. After her retirement from racing she became a broodmare and has had some success as a dam of winners.

== Background ==
Favourable Terms was a bay mare with a white star bred in the United Kingdom by her owner, Maktoum Al Maktoum's Gainsborough Stud. She was sired by Selkirk an American-bred miler who won the Queen Elizabeth II Stakes in 1991. As a breeding stallion, Selkirk's progeny include fifteen Group One winners including Wince, Cityscape (Dubai Duty Free), Leadership (Gran Premio di Milano) and Kastoria (Irish St. Leger) as well as the Champion Hurdler Sublimity. Favourable Terms' dam Fatefully was an American-bred mare who raced successfully in Europe, winning four races including the Listed October Stakes in 1996. She was a distant female-line descendant of Flambino, an American broodmare who was the dam of Omaha and Flares.

Favourable Terms was sent into training with Michael Stoute at Newmarket, Suffolk and was ridden in most of her races by Kieren Fallon.

== Racing career ==
=== 2003: three-year-old season ===
Favourable Terms did not race as a two-year-old in 2002 and made her racecourse debut in a maiden race over seven furlongs at Goodwood Racecourse on 21 May 2003. Starting the 11/4 favourite in a fifteen-runner field she overcame a slow start and an obstructed passage before accelerating into the lead a furlong out and winning by one and a quarter lengths from the Mick Channon-trained Pennyghael. The filly was immediately stepped up in class for the Listed Distaff Stakes over one mile at Sandown Park Racecourse and started 7/4 favourite ahead of eight opponents headed by the Albany Stakes winner Duty Paid. Fallon restrained the favourite at the rear of the field before Favourable Terms began to make progress in the last quarter mile. She took the lead 75 yards from the finish and won "readily" by a neck from Miss Ivanhoe. Two weeks later Favourable Terms was moved up in class and distance for the Golden Daffodil Stakes over ten furlongs at Chepstow Racecourse and started favourite ahead of the four-year-old Chorist who had won the Group One Pretty Polly Stakes on her last appearance. She sustained her first defeat as Chorist led from the start and beat her into second place by two and a half lengths.

In September Favourable Terms was sent to Ireland to contest the Group Two Matron Stakes over one mile at Leopardstown Racecourse in which her opponents included Perfect Touch (Brownstown Stakes), Cat Belling (Derrinstown Stud 1,000 Guineas Trial), Dossier (Platinum Stakes), Soldera (Valiant Stakes) and Shizao (Tipperary Stakes). In a change of tactics, Favourable Terms raced in second behind the outsider Dixie Evans before taking the lead early in the straight. She went clear of the field a furlong out before being eased down by Fallon and winning "cheekily" by a neck from Perfect Touch. On her final appearance of the season, Favourable Terms started favourite for the Group Two Sun Chariot Stakes at Newmarket Racecourse on 4 October in which she was ridden by Pat Eddery. Her owner showed great confidence in his filly before the race, announcing that "she will win". After starting slowly Favourable Terms made some progress approaching the straight but was unable to close on the leaders and finished fifth behind the Godolphin filly Echoes In Eternity.

=== 2004: four-year-old season ===
After an absence of over eight months, Favourable Terms return in the inaugural running of the Group Two Windsor Forest Stakes at Royal Ascot on 16 June and started 13/2 second favourite behind the South African mare Crimson Palace who had won the Middleton Stakes on her British debut. The other runners included Chic, Beneventa (Dahlia Stakes), Gonfilia (Princess Elizabeth Stakes), Marbye (Premio Emilio Turati), Actrice (Prix Corrida) and Soldera. She was settled behind the leaders before making progress in the straight and went to the front approaching the final furlong. She drew away in the closing stages and won by two lengths from the outsider Monturani. Fallon described the winner as "the most fluent mover I've ever ridden". Three weeks later she contested the Group One Falmouth Stakes at Newmarket but ran poorly and finished sixth of the seven runners behind Soviet Song.

In late July Favourable Terms stepped up in distance for the ten-furlong Nassau Stakes at Goodwood in which she started third choice in the betting behind her old rival Chorist and the Arlington-Washington Lassie Stakes winner Zosima. The other three runners were Echoes In Eternity, Silence Is Golden (Rosebery Stakes) and Mehoubah (Oaks d'Italia). Echoes In Eternity set the pace before giving was to Chorist in the straight, but Favourable Terms took the advantage a furlong out and hald off the late challenge of Silence Is Golden to win by a short head, with Chorist a neck away in third. The result was only confirmed after a stewards inquiry into possible interference caused when Favourable Terms hung to the right in the closing stages. After the race Michael Stoute, who was winning the race for the seventh time, said "We've won it with some very good ones, but she's a very admirable filly. We've had a lot of problems with her back and sometimes that compromises her. We have the physios working on her all the time".

=== 2005: five-year-old season ===
Favourable Terms was off the course for well over a year with back problems before returning as a five-year-old in the autumn of 2005. In the Listed Sceptre Stakes at Doncaster Racecourse she started the 5/6 favourite against eight younger fillies and won "comfortably" by two lengths from the Eternal Stakes winner Nufoos.

In her two remaining races Favourable Terms made little impact. In the Sun Chariot Stakes at Newmarket in October she was ridden by Jimmy Fortune she started second favourite but finished eighth of the ten runners behind Peeress. At the end of the month she was sent to the United States for the Breeders' Cup Filly & Mare Turf. She started a 20/1 outsider and stayed on in the straight to finish fifth behind Intercontinental.

== Breeding record ==
Favourable Terms was retired from racing to become a broodmare for the Darley Stud. To date (2016), she has produced at least five foals and three winners:

- Affirmative, a chestnut filly, foaled in 2007, sired by Pivotal. Unraced.
- Semester, chestnut filly, 2008, by Monsun. Won one race.
- Derivatives, bay filly, 2009, by Dansili. Won one race.
- Istamara, filly, 2010, by Teofilo. Unraced.
- Starletina, bay filly, 2012, by Sea the Stars. Won one race.

== Pedigree ==
Pedigree of Favourable Terms (GB), bay mare, 2000
Sire Selkirk (USA) 1988	Sharpen Up (GB); 1969	Atan	Native Dancer
Sire Selkirk (USA) 1988	Sharpen Up (GB); 1969	Atan	Mixed Marriage
Sire Selkirk (USA) 1988	Sharpen Up (GB); 1969	Rocchetta	Rockefella
Sire Selkirk (USA) 1988	Sharpen Up (GB); 1969	Rocchetta	Chambiges
Sire Selkirk (USA) 1988	Annie Edge (IRE); 1980	Nebbiolo	Yellow God
Sire Selkirk (USA) 1988	Annie Edge (IRE); 1980	Nebbiolo	Novara
Sire Selkirk (USA) 1988	Annie Edge (IRE); 1980	Friendly Court	Be Friendly
Sire Selkirk (USA) 1988	Annie Edge (IRE); 1980	Friendly Court	No Court
Dam Fatefully (USA) 1993	Private Account (USA); 1976	Damascus	Sword Dancer
Dam Fatefully (USA) 1993	Private Account (USA); 1976	Damascus	Kerala
Dam Fatefully (USA) 1993	Private Account (USA); 1976	Numbered Account	Buckpasser
Dam Fatefully (USA) 1993	Private Account (USA); 1976	Numbered Account	Intriguing
Dam Fatefully (USA) 1993	Fateful (USA); 1988	Topsider	Northern Dancer
Dam Fatefully (USA) 1993	Fateful (USA); 1988	Topsider	Drumtop
Dam Fatefully (USA) 1993	Fateful (USA); 1988	Fates Reward	Key to the Mint
Dam Fatefully (USA) 1993	Fateful (USA); 1988	Fates Reward	Cast the Die (Family: 17-b)
