= Singspiel Stakes (Dubai) =

- Class: Group 2
- Location: Meydan Racecourse; Dubai, United Arab Emirates
- Inaugurated: 2014
- Race type: Thoroughbred - Flat racing

Race information
- Distance: 1,800 metres
- Surface: Turf
- Track: Left-handed
- Qualification: 4-y-o+
- Purse: $200,000

The Singspiel Stakes, is a horse race for horses aged four and over, run at a distance of 1,800 metres (nine furlongs) on turf in January at Meydan Racecourse in Dubai.

The Singspiel Stakes was first contested in 2014 as a Listed race before being elevated to Group 3 class in 2018. It gained Group 2 status in 2020. It is named in honour of the racehorse Singspiel.

== Records ==
Record time:

- 1:46.82 - Lord Glitters 2021

Most successful horse:

- 2 - Benbatl 2018, 2020
- 2 - Lord Glitters 2021, 2022

Most wins by a jockey:

- 3 - Christophe Soumillon 2017, 2019, 2020

Most wins by a trainer:

- 4 - Saeed bin Suroor 2015, 2018, 2019, 2020

Most wins by an owner:

- 6 - Godolphin 2015, 2018, 2019, 2020, 2024, 2025

== Winners ==
Year	Winner	Age	Jockey	Trainer	Owner	Time
2014	Mushreq	5	Paul Hanagan	Mike de Kock	Hamdan Al Maktoum	1:50.32
2015	True Story	4	James Doyle	Saeed bin Suroor	Godolphin	1:48.79
2016	More Aspen	5	Richard Mullen	Satish Seemar	Mohamed Albousi Alghufli	1:49.80
2017	Light the Lights	5	Christophe Soumillon	Mike de Kock	Mohammed bin Khalifa Al Maktoum	1:48.12
2018	Benbatl	4	Oisin Murphy	Saeed bin Suroor	Godolphin	1:46.99
2019	Dream Castle	5	Christophe Soumillon	Saeed bin Suroor	Godolphin	1:49.40
2020	Benbatl	6	Christophe Soumillon	Saeed bin Suroor	Godolphin	1:52.18
2021	Lord Glitters	8	Adrie de Vries	David O'Meara	Geoff & Sandra Turnbull	1:46.82
2022	Lord Glitters	9	Daniel Tudhope	David O'Meara	Geoff & Sandra Turnbull	1:48.77
2023	Valiant Prince	9	James Doyle	Charlie Appleby	Godolphin	1:46.82
2024	Naval Power	4	Mickael Barzalona	Charlie Appleby	Godolphin	1:48.57
2025	Nations Pride	6	William Buick	Charlie Appleby	Godolphin	1:47.24
2026	Quddwah	6	Ryan Moore	Simon & Ed Crisford	Sheikh Ahmed Al Maktoum	1:53.17

== See also ==
- List of United Arab Emirates horse races
