= Red Bloom =

British-bred Thoroughbred racehorse

- Sire: Selkirk
- Grandsire: Sharpen Up
- Dam: Red Camellia
- Damsire: Polar Falcon
- Sex: Mare
- Foaled: 11 March 2001
- Country: United Kingdom
- Colour: Bay
- Breeder: Cheveley Park Stud
- Owner: Cheveley Park Stud
- Trainer: Michael Stoute
- Record: 19: 6-2-5
- Earnings: £436,480

Major wins
- Fillies' Mile (2003); Strensall Stakes (2004); Pipalong Stakes (2005); Blandford Stakes (2005, 2006)

Red Bloom (foaled 11 March 2001) is a British Thoroughbred racehorse and broodmare. In a racing career which lasted from July 2003 until October 2006 she ran nineteen times, competing in four different countries and won six times as well as being placed on seven occasions. As a juvenile she graduated from a maiden race victory to record her biggest success in the Group One Fillies' Mile. In the following year she was the beaten favourite for the 1000 Guineas but won the Strensall Stakes. She remained in training for two more seasons, winning the Pipalong Stakes and two editions of the Blandford Stakes. Apart from her wins, she reached the frame in the Coronation Stakes, Pretty Polly Stakes, Nassau Stakes and Prix Jean Romanet. At the end of her racing career she became broodmare for her owner, the Cheveley Park Stud.

== Background ==
Red Bloom is a bay mare with a white blaze and two white socks bred by David and Patricia Thompson's Newmarket-based Cheveley Park Stud. She was sired by Selkirk an American-bred miler who won the Queen Elizabeth II Stakes in 1991. As a breeding stallion, Selkirk's progeny include fifteen Group One winners including Wince, Cityscape (Dubai Duty Free), Leadership (Gran Premio di Milano) and Kastoria (Irish St Leger). Her dam, Red Camellia won three of her six races including the 1996 edition of the Prestige Stakes and was a great-granddaughter of Ouija, a broodmare whose other descendant have included Ouija Board, Ibn Bey, Teleprompter, Roseate Tern and Australia.

Red Bloom was trained throughout her racing career by Michael Stoute at Newmarket, Suffolk.

== Racing career ==
=== 2003: two-year-old season ===
Red Bloom began her racing career in a six furlong maiden race at Newbury Racecourse on 18 July. She was made the 13/8 favourite in a thirteen-runner field, but after challenging for the lead she appeared to be outpaced in the closing stages and finished third behind the outsiders Nataliya and Kunda. In the following month she started favourite for a similar event over seven furlongs at Newmarket and recorded her first success, leading for most of the way for most of the way and winning by two lengths from Silk Fan and ten others.

The filly was then stepped up in class and distance for the Group One Fillies' Mile at Ascot Racecourse on 27 September. The prevailing firm ground led to the late withdrawal of four horses, including the strongly-fancied Irish filly Necklace. Ridden as on her debut by Kieren Fallon she started the 3/1 second favourite behind the previously undefeated Punctilious whilst the other five runners were River Belle (Princess Margaret Stakes), Ithaca (runner in the Prestige Stakes), Menhoubah (third in the Moyglare Stud Stakes) and the highly regarded maiden winners Sundrop and Tarot Card. Fallon settled the filly behind the leaders as Punctilious set the pace. Red Bloom overtook the favourite approaching the final furlong and won by a length and a half from Sundrop. After the race Fallon commented "She has killed them. She came there cruising, and no sooner has she hit the front than she pricked her ears and pulled up with me. Otherwise she would have been even more impressive. She's going the right way and has a big future".

=== 2004: three-year-old season ===
On her first appearance as a three-year-old Red Bloom was made the favourite in a sixteen-runner field for the 191st running of the 1000 Guineas over Newmarket's Rowley Mile course on 2 May. She had not contested a trial race but had performed impressively in a public training gallop at the course on 15 April. Fallon settled her behind the leaders but although she stayed on in the closing stages she never looked likely to win and finished fourth behind Attraction, Sundrop and Hathrah. At Royal Ascot in June she faced Attraction again in the Group One Coronation Stakes and was again beaten, finishing third behind the Guineas winner and the outsider Majestic Desert. In August the filly was dropped to Group Three class for the nine furlong Strensall Stakes at York Racecourse in which she was matched against male opposition and older horses for the first time. Ridden by Kevin Darley she was made favourite with her three opponents being Imperial Dancer (Premio Roma), Babodana (Lincoln Handicap) and Salselon (Premio Chiusura). After tracking the leader Babodana, she took the lead inside the final furlong and won by half a length from Salselon. After the race, Cheveley Park Stud's managing director Chris Richardson commented "It was a muddling early pace but she appeared to like the easy ground, and the further she went, the better".

In September, she was sent to Ireland for the Blandford Stakes at the Curragh in which she was moved up to race over ten furlongs for the first time. She started the 13/8 favourite, but although she stayed on in the straight she finished only fourth of the thirteen runners behind the Geoff Wragg-trained five-year-old Monturani.

=== 2005: four-year-old season ===
Red Bloom began her third season by starting favourite for the Group Three Dahlia Stakes at Newmarket on 1 May but finished lame in fifth place behind Tarfah. She recovered sufficiently to contest the Listed Pipalong Stakes over one mile at Pontefract Racecourse on 6 June and started 6/4 favourite ahead of Summitville, a mare who had won the May Hill Stakes in 2002. Ridden by Robert Winston, she tracked Summitville before overtaking her rival inside the final furlong and winning by a neck.

Red Bloom was placed in her next three races, finishing second to Alexander Goldrun in the Pretty Polly Stakes, third to the same filly in the Nassau Stakes and second to Pride in the Prix Jean Romanet at Deauville Racecourse on 21 August. On 18 September she made her second appearance in the Blandford Stakes and started 15/8 favourite ahead of the Moyglare Stud Stakes winner Chelsea Rose and nine other fillies and mares. Racing on her favoured firm ground, she was positioned in third by Kieren Fallon before moving up to take the lead a quarter mile from the finish. Red Bloom opened up a clear advantage and stayed on in the closing stages to win by one and a half lengths and a length from Pictavia and Kinnaird. On her final appearance of the season she finished sixth of the nine runners behind Kinnaird in the Prix de l'Opéra at Longchamp Racecourse in October.

=== 2006: five-year-old season ===
Red Bloom began her fourth season by finishing fourth behind Strawberry Dale in the Middleton Stakes at York in May. She then finished third behind her old rival Alexander Goldrun in the Pretty Polly Stakes before running third to Satwa Queen when favourite for the Prix Jean Romanet. On 19 September the mare attempted to repeat her 2005 as she contested the Blandford Stakes for the third time. Racing on soft ground she was ridden by Jamie Spencer and started 11/8 favourite ahead of Race for the Stars, an Aidan O'Brien-trained three-year old whose wins included the Oh So Sharp Stakes and the Denny Cordell Fillies Stakes. The best fancied of the other nine runners were Strawberry Dale and Blessyourpinksox (Kilboy Estate Stakes, Dance Design Stakes). In a repeat of her performance of the previous year she settled in the third, took the lead two furlongs out, broke clear of the field and stayed on in the final furlong to win by one and three quarter length. Sina Cova finished second ahead of Paris Winds and Be My Queen. Spencer commented "She's a classy filly... [Michael Stoute] told me that this was her time of year and that she always comes to herself around now. She won very easily in the end. My only concern was the ground. For a five-year-old mare she was full of herself and she is a credit to Cheveley Park for keeping her in training".

Red Bloom ended her career with a trip to Canada for the E. P. Taylor Stakes at Woodbine Racetrack on 22 October. She started favourite but was hampered twice in the straight and finished sixth behind Arravale.

== Breeding record ==
Red Bloom was retired from racing to become a broodmare for the Cheveley Park Stud. To date (December 2015) she has produced at least seven foals and two winners:

- Vasily, a bay colt, foaled in 2008, sired by Sadler's Wells. Won five races.
- Unnamed filly, foaled 2009, by Dansili
- Unnamed bay colt, foaled 2010, by Duke of Marmalade
- Sea The Bloom, bay filly, 2011, by Sea the Stars. Won one race.
- Profusion, bay colt, 2012, by Dansili. Unraced.
- Raconteur, bay colt, 2013, by Acclamation. Unraced.
- Simply Brillant ex Senator, chestnut colt, 2014, by Frankel. Gr3 Winner, Gr1 & Gr2 placements. Total gains over 1,3 mln €.
- Verbena, bay filly, 2018, by Lethal Force, placed in UK.

== Pedigree ==
Pedigree of Red Bloom (GB), bay mare, 2001
Sire Selkirk (USA) 1988	Sharpen Up (GB); 1969	Atan	Native Dancer
Sire Selkirk (USA) 1988	Sharpen Up (GB); 1969	Atan	Mixed Marriage
Sire Selkirk (USA) 1988	Sharpen Up (GB); 1969	Rocchetta	Rockfella
Sire Selkirk (USA) 1988	Sharpen Up (GB); 1969	Rocchetta	Chambiges
Sire Selkirk (USA) 1988	Annie Edge (IRE); 1980	Nebbiolo	Yellow God
Sire Selkirk (USA) 1988	Annie Edge (IRE); 1980	Nebbiolo	Novara
Sire Selkirk (USA) 1988	Annie Edge (IRE); 1980	Friendly Court	Be Friendly
Sire Selkirk (USA) 1988	Annie Edge (IRE); 1980	Friendly Court	No Court
Dam Red Camellia (GB) 1994	Polar Falcon (USA); 1987	Nureyev	Northern Dancer
Dam Red Camellia (GB) 1994	Polar Falcon (USA); 1987	Nureyev	Special
Dam Red Camellia (GB) 1994	Polar Falcon (USA); 1987	Marie d'Argonne	Jefferson
Dam Red Camellia (GB) 1994	Polar Falcon (USA); 1987	Marie d'Argonne	Mohair
Dam Red Camellia (GB) 1994	Cerise Bouquet (GB); 1982	Mummy's Pet	Sing Sing
Dam Red Camellia (GB) 1994	Cerise Bouquet (GB); 1982	Mummy's Pet	Money For Nothing
Dam Red Camellia (GB) 1994	Cerise Bouquet (GB); 1982	Rosia Bay	High Top
Dam Red Camellia (GB) 1994	Cerise Bouquet (GB); 1982	Rosia Bay	Ouija (Family: 12-b)
