= Dreamloper =

Irish-bred racehorse

- Sire: Lope de Vega
- Grandsire: Shamardal
- Dam: Livia's Dream
- Damsire: Teofilo
- Sex: Mare
- Foaled: 26 April 2017
- Country: Ireland
- Color: Bay
- Breeder: Olivia Hoare
- Owner: Olivia Hoare & Paola Hewins; Jason Fill
- Trainer: Ed Walker
- Record: 17: 6-1-3
- Earnings: £537,971

Major wins
- Valiant Stakes (2021); Dahlia Stakes (2022); Prix d'Ispahan (2022); Prix du Moulin (2022)

Dreamloper (foaled 26 April 2017) is an Irish-bred, British-trained Thoroughbred racehorse. She did not race until she was three-years-old when she won two minor races from five starts. In the following year she made steady improvement, winning the Group 3 Valiant Stakes and running third in the Group 1 Sun Chariot Stakes. She progressed again in 2022, taking the Dahlia Stakes, the Prix d'Ispahan and Prix du Moulin de Longchamp.

== Background ==
Dreamloper is a bay mare with no white markings bred in Ireland by Olivia Hoare. She originally raced in the ownership of Hoare in partnership with Paola Hewins but from her third race she carried the colours of Jason Fill. She was sent into training with Ed Walker at Kingsdown Stables in Upper Lambourn, Berkshire.

She was from the fifth crop of foals sired by the Prix du Jockey Club winner Lope de Vega. His other foals have included Newspaperofrecord, Belardo, Lucky Vega, Zabeel Prince, Gytrash and Phoenix of Spain. Dreamloper's dam Livia's Dream showed good racing ability, winning four of her twenty-six races including the Listed Wild Flower Stakes. She was a female-line descendant of the Epsom Oaks winner Bireme.

== Racing career ==
=== 2020: three-year-old season ===
Dreamloper did not race as a juvenile, and the early part of the 2020 season in England was disrupted by the COVID-19 pandemic. She made a belated track debut on 5 June at Newmarket Racecourse when she finished fourth in a seven furlong maiden race on good to firm ground. She was back on the course three weeks later when she ran third in a novice race (for horses with no more than two previous wins) at Doncaster Racecourse. William Buick took the ride on 27 July at Redcar Racecourse when the filly started 5/6 favourite for a novice race and recorded her first success as she went clear of her opponents in the closing stages to win by seven and a half lengths.

For the next phase of her career Dreamloper was campaigned in handicap races starting in August when she ran third on the synthetic polytrack surface at Kempton Park. On 5 September the filly was assigned a weight of 120 pounds and started at odds of 9/2 for a contest over one mile at Ascot Racecourse. Ridden by Luke Morris she ended her season with a victory as she went to the front a furlong out and won by a neck from Perfect Inch.

=== 2021: four-year-old season ===
Dreamloper began her second season by finishing fourth over seven furlongs at Haydock Park in April and then ran second over one mile at Ascot in May. At Royal Ascot in June she started favourite for the Kensington Palace Stakes (a straight one-mile handicap for fillies and mares) but came home tenth of the seventeen finishers after being repeatedly obstructed when attempting to obtain a clear run in the last quarter mile. A month later at the same track the filly was stepped up in class for the Group 3 Valiant Stakes over one mile on the round course and went off the 13/2 fourth choice in the betting behind Indigo Girl (May Hill Stakes), Light Out (Pipalong Stakes) and Declared Interest. Ridden by Oisin Murphy she tracked the leaders before taking the lead a furlong out and went clear of her rivals to win "readily" by four and a half lengths. After the race Ed Walker said "We were so confident going into Royal Ascot and I still haven't found any reason why she ran so flat that day. It's great she's been able to show her true ability and I thought Oisin was excellent. A huge shout to Molly Stratton who rides her every day and has done a great job as she's not an easy filly" while Murphy commented "It was a huge step up on what she's done and why not step up a bit higher?"

At Newbury Racecourse in August Dreamloper was matched against male opposition in the Hungerford Stakes and came home fourth behind Sacred. On 11 September she was sent to Ireland and stepped up to Group 1 class for the Matron Stakes at Leopardstown Racecourse. She started the 8/1 third choice in the betting but never looked likely to win and came home tenth of the thirteen runners behind No Speak Alexander. On her final appearance of the season Dreamloper was ridden by Kieran Shoemark when she started a 25/1 outsider for the Group 1 Sun Chariot Stakes at Newmarket. After racing towards the rear of the twelve-runner field she stayed on strongly in the closing stages to finish third behind the three-year-olds Saffron Beach and Mother Earth.

=== 2022: five-year-old season ===
On her first appearance as a five-year-old Dreamloper, with Shoemark in the saddle, contested the Group 2 Dahlia Stakes over nine furlongs at Newmarket on 1 May and went off the 4/1 third choice behind Ebaiyra (Prix Corrida) and Ville de Grace (Pride Stakes) in a six-runner field which also included Lilac Road (Upavon Fillies' Stakes). She tracked the leaders as the 66/1 outsider Romantic Rival set the pace and then made good progress in the last quarter mile. In a closely contested finish she ran down the leader Ville de Grace in the final strides to win by a nose with Ebaiyra a short head away in third place. Ed Walker commented "I thought we were definitely beaten. I've always thought plenty of her, but she's been quite difficult to train... she's getting more and more relaxed now. In the Sun Chariot all she was doing was closing so I was confident she'd stay further, but she'd been so keen in the past. Kieran gets on really well with her."

Four weeks after her win at Newmarket, Dreamloper was sent to France to contest the Group 1 Prix d'Ispahan over 1800 metres on good to soft ground at Longchamp Racecourse and started at odds of 5.2/1 in a six-runner field. Pretty Tiger (Prix Eugene Adam) started favourite while the other contenders were Sealiway, Dilawar (Prix Quincey), Wally (Gran Premio di Milano) and Dawn Intello (La Coupe de Maisons-Laffitte). Shoemark settled the mare in second place behind Sealiway before taking the lead 500 metres from the finish and Dreamloper stayed on well to win by a length from Wally. After the race Walker said "Kieran was brilliant on her today. She's never relaxed like that in a race before and he got her beautifully switched off then pressed the button at exactly the right time. There are lots of options now she's beaten the boys... she's beaten some very good horses there.... When she performs like that you'd give her a chance against most."

== Pedigree ==
Pedigree of Dreamloper (IRE), bay mare, 2017
Sire Lope de Vega (IRE) 2007	Shamardal (USA); 2002	Giant's Causeway	Storm Cat
Sire Lope de Vega (IRE) 2007	Shamardal (USA); 2002	Giant's Causeway	Mariah's Storm
Sire Lope de Vega (IRE) 2007	Shamardal (USA); 2002	Helsinki (GB)	Machiavellian (USA)
Sire Lope de Vega (IRE) 2007	Shamardal (USA); 2002	Helsinki (GB)	Helen Street
Sire Lope de Vega (IRE) 2007	Lady Vettori (GB); 1997	Vettori (IRE)	Machiavellian (USA)
Sire Lope de Vega (IRE) 2007	Lady Vettori (GB); 1997	Vettori (IRE)	Air Distingue (USA)
Sire Lope de Vega (IRE) 2007	Lady Vettori (GB); 1997	Lady Golconda (FR)	Kendor
Sire Lope de Vega (IRE) 2007	Lady Vettori (GB); 1997	Lady Golconda (FR)	Lady Sharp
Dam Livia's Dream (IRE) 2009	Teofilo (IRE); 2004	Galileo	Sadler's Wells (USA)
Dam Livia's Dream (IRE) 2009	Teofilo (IRE); 2004	Galileo	Urban Sea (USA)
Dam Livia's Dream (IRE) 2009	Teofilo (IRE); 2004	Speirbhean	Danehill (USA)
Dam Livia's Dream (IRE) 2009	Teofilo (IRE); 2004	Speirbhean	Saviour (USA)
Dam Livia's Dream (IRE) 2009	Brindisi (GB); 2001	Dr Fong (USA)	Kris S
Dam Livia's Dream (IRE) 2009	Brindisi (GB); 2001	Dr Fong (USA)	Spring Flight
Dam Livia's Dream (IRE) 2009	Brindisi (GB); 2001	Genoa	Zafonic (USA)
Dam Livia's Dream (IRE) 2009	Brindisi (GB); 2001	Genoa	Yawl (Family: 11-d)

- Through her sire, Dreamloper was inbred 4 × 4 to Machiavellian, meaning that this stallion appears twice in the fourth generation of her pedigree.
