= Nahrain (horse) =

British-bred racehorse

- Sire: Selkirk
- Grandsire: Sharpen Up
- Dam: Bahr
- Damsire: Generous
- Sex: Mare
- Foaled: 29 January 2008
- Country: United Kingdom
- Colour: Chestnut
- Breeder: Darley Stud
- Owner: Ahmed Al-Maktoum
- Trainer: Roger Varian
- Record: 10: 5-1-1
- Earnings: £669,336

Major wins
- Coral Distaff (2011); Prix de l'Opéra (2011); Flower Bowl Stakes (2012)

Nahrain (foaled 29 January 2008) is a British Thoroughbred racehorse and broodmare. Unraced as a two-year-old she won her first four races in 2011 including the Coral Distaff and the Prix de l'Opéra before finishind second in the Breeders' Cup Filly & Mare Turf. She struggled to find her form in the early part of the 2012 season but returned to her best to take the Flower Bowl Stakes. She made an immediate impact as a broodmare, with her first foal being Benbatl.

== Background ==
Nahrain is a chestnut mare with a broad white blaze bred in England by the Darley Stud. During her racing career she carried the yellow and black colours of Ahmed Al-Maktoum and was initially sent into training with Michael Jarvis at Newmarket, Suffolk. When Jarvis retired in early 2011 the stable was taken over by his assistant Roger Varian, who trained Nahrain throughout her racing career.

She was sired by Selkirk an American-bred miler who won the Queen Elizabeth II Stakes in 1991. As a breeding stallion, his other successful offspring included Wince, Sublimity, Kastoria and Cityscape. Nahrain's dam Bahr was a top-class middle-distance performer who won the Musidora Stakes and Ribblesdale Stakes as well as finishing second in the Epsom Oaks. She was a granddaughter of the outstanding New Zealand racemare La Mer.

Her name means 'two rivers' (نهرين) in Arabic and Assyrian (ܢܗܪܝܢ), which refers to the Euphrates and Tigris rivers in Iraq.

== Racing career ==
=== 2011: three-year-old season ===
Nahrain did not race as a juvenile, owing to an injury sustained in July 2010, and made her racecourse debut in a maiden race over one mile on good to firm ground at Windsor Racecourse on 16 May. Ridden by Neil Callan she started at odds of 11/2 and won by a length from Paoletta after taking the lead approaching the final furlong. William Buick took the ride when the filly started 8/15 favourite for a handicap race over the same distance at Haydock Park on 9 June and won "very easily" by five lengths under a weight of 131 pounds. At Sandown Park on 2 July Nahrain was stepped up in class and, with Callan in the saddle, started 4/6 favourite in a six-runner field for the Listed Coral Distaff. After starting poorly she settled in fourth place before taking the lead approaching the final furlong and won "readily" by one and a half lengths from Primevere. After the race the filly lost her form: according to Varian "she fell away on us. She lost a lot of condition, and with a huge team effort in the yard, she has [was] nursed back".

After an absence of three months, Nahrain returned to the track on 2 October when she was sent to France to contest the Group 1 Prix de l'Opéra over 2000 metres at Longchamp Racecourse. Ridden by Frankie Dettori she started second favourite behind the four-year-old Announce (winner of the Prix Jean Romanet) in a ten-runner field which also included Banimpire (Ribblesdale Stakes), Sandy's Charm (Prix de Lieurey), Epic Love (Prix Vanteaux) and Djumama (Schwarzgold-Rennen). After tracking the leaders, Nahrain looked unlikely to obtain a clear run in the straight before accelerating into the lead in the last 200 metres and held off a challenge from Announce to win by a nose. After the race Varian alluded to the fact that Michael Jarvis had died in September as he commented "It was a real special day, and that's understating it. It was dreamy stuff. To coincide with such an emotional two weeks was incredible. My first Group 1 winner on Arc Day in Paris – it really hasn’t sunk in yet. Nahrain is a very talented filly, and she has overcome a lot to get to Group 1 level so quickly".

For her final run of the season, Nahrain was sent to the United States for the Breeders' Cup Filly & Mare Turf at Churchill Downs on 4 November and started the 3/1 second favourite behind Stacelita. After being settled in mid-division by Dettori she took the lead in the straight but sustained her first defeat as she was overtaken in the final strides and beaten into second place by the four-year-old outsider Perfect Shirl. Varian said "I'm really proud of her. She ran a really great race. I thought we had it off the bend".

In the 2011 World Thoroughbred Rankings Nahrain was given a rating of 117, making her the 136th best racehorse in the world and the best three-year-old filly trained in Britain.

=== 2012: four-year-old season ===
Nahrain was ridden by Callan in her first three races of 2012. On 20 June at Royal Ascot her second campaign began disappointingly when she tired badly in the closing stages of the Group 2 Windsor Forest Stakes and came home ninth of the thirteen runners behind Joviality, beaten almost eight lengths by the winner. The Nassau Stakes at Goodwood Racecourse on 4 August saw little improvement in her form as she finished last of the eight runners behind The Fugue, looking to be outpaced by her rivals in the last quarter mile. On 9 September the filly was sent to Ireland for the Blandford Stakes at the Curragh and produced a better effort as she stayed on well to take third place behind the three-year-olds Up and Caponata.

Three weeks after her run in Ireland Nahrain ran for the second time in the United States when she was partnered by John Velasquez and started at odds of 5/1 for the Grade I Flower Bowl Invitational Stakes at Belmont Park. Dream Peace (Prix de la Nonette) started favourite, while the other six runners included I'm A Dreamer (Beverly D. Stakes), Zagora, Hit It Rich (Glens Falls Stakes) and Halo Dolly (Yellow Ribbon Handicap). She settled in fifth place as Hit It Rich set a slow pace, before launching a challenge on the outside as the field rounded the final turn. The closing stages saw a four-way struggle between Zagora, I'm A Dreamer, Nahrain and Dream Peace, with the British filly gaining the advantage fifty yards from the finish to win by half a length. The racecourse stewards held an inquiry into possible interference caused when Nahrain bumped into Dream Peace as she angled right on the final turn but left the result unchanged. Roger Varian commented "She showed us in her last start when she was third at the Curragh that she was coming back to herself... We’re in [the Breeders’ Cup] now, aren't we? We were second last year. From when she was second last year we were keen to have another toot at it this year. She's shown up today, hasn't she?"

At Santa Anita Park on 2 November Nahrain made her second attempt to win the Breeders' Cup Filly & Mare Turf. Ridden by Dettori she started the 8/1 third choice in the betting but was never in serious contention and came home tenth of the eleven runners behind Zagora. A month later it was announced that the filly had been retired from racing, with Varian saying "She has been a huge asset to the start of my training career... She has been a pleasure to train, and I now hope she has a long and successful career as a broodmare."

In the 2012 World Thoroughbred Rankings Nahrain was given a rating of 116, making her the 170th best racehorse in the world.

== Breeding record ==
At the end of her racing career Nahrain was retired to become a broodmare for the Darley Sud. She has produced at least five foals and three winners:

- Benbatl, a bay colt, foaled in 2014, sired by Dubawi. Won ten races including the Dubai Turf, Bayerisches Zuchtrennen and Caulfield Stakes.
- Ta Allak, chestnut colt, 2015, by New Approach. Third on only start.
- Basford Dan, bay colt (later gelded), 2016, by Dansili. Unraced.
- Fooraat, bay filly, 2017, by Dubawi. Won one race.
- Elmalka, bay filly, 2021, by Kingman. Has won two races, including the 1000 Guineas Stakes.

== Pedigree ==
Pedigree of Nahrain (GB), chestnut mare, 2008
| Sire Selkirk (USA) 1988 | Sharpen Up (GB); 1969 | Atan (USA) | Native Dancer |
| Sire Selkirk (USA) 1988 | Sharpen Up (GB); 1969 | Atan (USA) | Mixed Marriage (GB) |
| Sire Selkirk (USA) 1988 | Sharpen Up (GB); 1969 | Rocchetta | Rockefella |
| Sire Selkirk (USA) 1988 | Sharpen Up (GB); 1969 | Rocchetta | Chambiges (FR) |
| Sire Selkirk (USA) 1988 | Annie Edge (IRE); 1980 | Nebbiolo (GB) | Yellow God |
| Sire Selkirk (USA) 1988 | Annie Edge (IRE); 1980 | Nebbiolo (GB) | Novara (GER) |
| Sire Selkirk (USA) 1988 | Annie Edge (IRE); 1980 | Friendly Court | Be Friendly (GB) |
| Sire Selkirk (USA) 1988 | Annie Edge (IRE); 1980 | Friendly Court | No Court (GB) |
| Dam Bahr (GB) 1995 | Generous (IRE); 1988 | Caerleon (USA) | Nijinsky (CAN) |
| Dam Bahr (GB) 1995 | Generous (IRE); 1988 | Caerleon (USA) | Foreseer |
| Dam Bahr (GB) 1995 | Generous (IRE); 1988 | Doff The Derby (USA) | Master Derby |
| Dam Bahr (GB) 1995 | Generous (IRE); 1988 | Doff The Derby (USA) | Margarethen |
| Dam Bahr (GB) 1995 | Lady of the Sea (IRE); 1986 | Mill Reef (USA) | Never Bend |
| Dam Bahr (GB) 1995 | Lady of the Sea (IRE); 1986 | Mill Reef (USA) | Milan Mill |
| Dam Bahr (GB) 1995 | Lady of the Sea (IRE); 1986 | La Mer (NZ) | Copenhagen (GB) |
| Dam Bahr (GB) 1995 | Lady of the Sea (IRE); 1986 | La Mer (NZ) | La Balsa (Family: 6-d) |
