= Lady Bowthorpe =

British Thoroughbred racehorse

- Sire: Nathaniel
- Grandsire: Galileo
- Dam: Maglietta Fina
- Damsire: Verglas
- Sex: Mare
- Foaled: 22 April 2016
- Country: United Kingdom
- Colour: Bay
- Breeder: Scuderia Archi Romani
- Owner: Emma Banks
- Trainer: William Jarvis
- Record: 18: 5-4-1
- Earnings: £669,778

Major wins
- Valiant Stakes (2020); Dahlia Stakes (2021); Nassau Stakes (2021)

Lady Bowthorpe (foaled 22 April 2016) is a retired British Thoroughbred racehorse. She showed modest ability in her early career, finishing fourth on her only start as a juvenile and winning one minor race as a three-year-old in the following year. She improved in 2020, winning two races including the Group 3 Valiant Stakes. Lady Bowthorpe was even better as a five-year-old when she won the Dahlia Stakes and finished second in the Lockinge Stakes before recording a Group 1 win in the Nassau Stakes. She was retired at the end of the season and had her first foal in January 2023.

== Background ==
Lady Bowthorpe is a bay mare with a small white star and a white sock on her left hind leg bred in England by Scuderia Archi Romani. In October 2017 the yearling filly was consigned to the Tattersalls sale and was bought for 82,000 guineas by James Toller. She entered the ownership of Emma Banks and was sent into training with William Jarvis at the Phantom House Stable in Newmarket, Suffolk.

She was from the third crop of foals sired by Nathaniel who won the King George VI and Queen Elizabeth Stakes in 2011 and the Eclipse Stakes in the following year. As a breeding stallion he is best known as the sire of Enable. Lady Bowthorpe's dam Maglietta Fina, a half-sister to the Sandown Mile winner Tullius, showed good ability on the track, winning four races in Italy and one in England. As a broodmare she had previously produced the top-class sprinter Speak In Colours who won the Greenlands Stakes, Ballycorus Stakes and Renaissance Stakes. She was a granddaughter of the Shirley Jones Handicap winner Meringue Pie who was in turn a descendant of the British-bred broodmare Batta.

== Racing career ==
=== 2018: two-year-old season ===
Lady Bowthorpe began her racing career in a novice race (for horses with no more than two previous wins) over six furlongs on good to firm ground at Yarmouth Racecourse on 20 September when she started at odds of 10/1 and finished fourth behind Hidden Message, beaten five and a half lengths by the winner.

=== 2019: three-year-old season ===
On her first appearance as a three-year-old Lady Bowthorpe ran fifth in a seven furlong novice race on the synthetic Polytrack surface at Chelmsford City Racecourse on 3 August. In a similar event at Lingfield Park later that month she was ridden by Kieran Shoemark (who became her regular jockey) and recorded her first success as she led from the start and won "comfortably" by two lengths from Sloane Garden. In her remaining contests that year she reverted to turf and finished second in Handicap races at Sandown Park in September and Newmarket in October.

=== 2020: four-year-old season ===
The 2020 flat racing season in Britain was disrupted by the COVID-19 pandemic with racing being suspended in spring before resuming in June. On the 6th of that month Lady Bowthorpe began her third campaign in a minor handicap over one mile on the Polytrack at Lingfield and won by one and a quarter lengths from Baby Steps despite her apprentice jockey Thomas Greatrex dropping his whip in the closing stages. Three weeks later she finished sixth when favourite for a handicap at Newmarket after which she was stepped up in class for the Listed Pipalong Stakes at Pontefract Racecourse and came home fourth of the nine runners behind Romola. In the Group 3 Valiant Stakes at Ascot Racecourse on 26 July she was ridden by Shoemark and went off the 12/1 seventh choice in the betting. After being restrained towards the rear of the field she took the lead approaching the final furlong and drew away to win "readily" by four and three quarter lengths. William Jarvis commented: "I've always thought she is good. She has been unlucky not to win more races. Things just haven't panned out her way, but she is smart. I was very impressed with the way she did it. She hasn't quite achieved what we hoped she would, but she is owned by a very patient owner. It is her first Group winner and she is a valuable filly now."

In her two remaining races of 2020 she finished sixth in the Group 3 Atalanta Stakes at Sandown on 23 August and was then moved up to Group 1 class for the Sun Chariot Stakes at Newmarket in October when she came home sixth of the twelve runners behind Nazeef.

=== 2021: five-year-old season ===
Lady Bowthorpe made her first appearance as a five-year-old in the Group 2 Dahlia Stakes over nine furlongs on good to firm ground at Newmarket on 2 May and went off the 6/1 third choice in a seven-runner field. She was restrained towards the rear by Shoemark before making progress to take the lead inside the final furlong and held off the challenge of the favourite Queen Power to win by a head. After the race Jarvis said "in the last week she has really come to hand, and I was desperate to run her today. We were concerned about the ground, and I walked the course a couple of times. I felt it was safe racing ground and let her take her chance. She's a very special filly, and I think she will hopefully continue to improve as the year goes on. She does take a bit of managing, but these tricky women sometimes give you the most pleasure!"

The mare was then matched against male opposition in the Group 1 Lockinge Stakes on 15 May and despite starting a 22/1 outsider she produced a career best effort as she finished second to the odds-on favourite Palace Pier, beaten one and a half lengths by her four-year-old rival. In the Group 2 Duke of Cambridge Stakes at Royal Ascot in June Lady Bowthorpe took the lead approaching the last quarter mile but was overtaken a furlong out and beaten into second place by the outsider Indie Angel. In a strongly-contested edition of the Group 1 Falmouth Stakes at Newmarket on 9 July the mare came home fourth behind the three-year-olds Snow Lantern, Mother Earth and Alcohol Free, beaten a length by the winner after overcoming trouble in running in the last two furlongs.

On 29 July Lady Bowthorpe, with Shoemark in the saddle, was moved up in distance for the Nassau Stakes over ten furlongs at Goodwood Racecourse and started the 100/30 third favourite behind Audarya and Joan of Arc in a six-runner field which also included Empress Josephine, Zeyaadah (Hoppings Stakes) and Technique. Lady Bowthorpe settled in third place behind Joan of Arc and Zeyaadah before gaining the advantage a furlong out and staying on well in the closing stages to win by one and a half lengths. Jarvis, who was winning his first Group 1 race since Grand Lodge took the St James's Palace Stakes in 1994, said: "I've never lost faith in myself as a racehorse trainer, quite a lot of other people may have done but that doesn't really bother me... I was confident she'd stay. I was a little bit worried about [Zeyaadah] because she wasn't stopping but I know we've got that great turn of foot and that's her real strength. She's relaxed and settling so much better now. She's a superstar..." Her next race was the Prix Jean Romanet at Deauville, where she started favourite but finished seventh of eight runners, five and a quarter lengths behind the winner. Lady Bowthorpe made her final racecourse appearance on British Champions Day at Ascot in the Queen Elizabeth II Stakes. She started as a 40/1 outsider and finished third of ten runners, one and a half lengths behind Baaeed and Palace Pier. Her trainer said "I think that was a career-best performance. The first and second are probably the two best milers in the world, so we’re the third best."

== Breeding career ==
Lady Bowthorpe was retired to paddocks following the Queen Elizabeth II Stakes. She had her first foal, a colt by Dubawi, in January 2023.

== Pedigree ==
Pedigree of Lady Bowthorpe (GB), bay mare, 2016
Sire Nathaniel (IRE) 2008	Galileo (IRE); 1998	Sadler's Wells (USA)	Northern Dancer (CAN)
Sire Nathaniel (IRE) 2008	Galileo (IRE); 1998	Sadler's Wells (USA)	Fairy Bridge
Sire Nathaniel (IRE) 2008	Galileo (IRE); 1998	Urban Sea (USA)	Miswaki
Sire Nathaniel (IRE) 2008	Galileo (IRE); 1998	Urban Sea (USA)	Allegretta (GB)
Sire Nathaniel (IRE) 2008	Magnificient Style (USA); 1993	Silver Hawk	Roberto
Sire Nathaniel (IRE) 2008	Magnificient Style (USA); 1993	Silver Hawk	Gris Vitesse
Sire Nathaniel (IRE) 2008	Magnificient Style (USA); 1993	Mia Karina	Icecapade
Sire Nathaniel (IRE) 2008	Magnificient Style (USA); 1993	Mia Karina	Basin
Dam Maglietta Fina (IRE) 2009	Verglas (IRE); 1994	Highest Honor (FR)	Kenmare
Dam Maglietta Fina (IRE) 2009	Verglas (IRE); 1994	Highest Honor (FR)	High River
Dam Maglietta Fina (IRE) 2009	Verglas (IRE); 1994	Rahaam (USA)	Secreto
Dam Maglietta Fina (IRE) 2009	Verglas (IRE); 1994	Rahaam (USA)	Fager's Glory
Dam Maglietta Fina (IRE) 2009	Whipped Queen (USA); 1997	Kingmambo	Mr Prospector
Dam Maglietta Fina (IRE) 2009	Whipped Queen (USA); 1997	Kingmambo	Miesque
Dam Maglietta Fina (IRE) 2009	Whipped Queen (USA); 1997	Meringue Pie	Silent Screen
Dam Maglietta Fina (IRE) 2009	Whipped Queen (USA); 1997	Meringue Pie	Bavarian Cream (Family: 7-a)
