= Valiant Stakes =

Flat horse race in Great Britain

- Class: Group 3
- Location: Ascot Racecourse; Ascot, England
- Inaugurated: 1998 (as Bonusprint Fillies' Conditions Stakes)
- Race type: Flat / Thoroughbred
- Sponsor: Longines
- Website: Ascot

Race information
- Distance: 7f 213y (1,603 metres)
- Surface: Turf
- Track: Right-handed
- Qualification: Three-years-old and up fillies & mares
- Weight: 8 st 11 lb (3yo); 9 st 5 lb (4yo+)
- Purse: £85,000 (2025); 1st: £48,204

Valiant Stakes
2026
Kon Tiki	Esna	Skydance

Previous years
2025
Cheshire Dancer	American Gal	Chantilly Lace
2024
Friendly Soul	Doom	Naomi Lapaglia
2023
Random Harvest	Roman Mist	Thornbrook
2022
Jumbly	Oscula	Novemba
2021
Dreamloper	Lights On	Waliyak

2020-2011
2020
Lady Bowthorpe	Farzeen	Look Around
2019
Duneflower	Look Around	Magnetic Charm
2018
Clon Coulis	Di Fede	Preening
2017
On Her Toes	Pirouette	Tisbutadream
2016
Red Box	Irish Rookie	Namhroodah
2015
Evita Peron	Solar Magic	Molly Dolly
2014
Euro Charline	Kiyoshi	Zurigha
2013
Zibelina	Ultrasonic	Winter's Night
2012
Thistle Bird	Villeneuve	Moone's My Name
2011
Sooraah	Primevere	Winter's Night

2010-2001
2010
Field Day	Chachamaidee	Alsace Lorraine
2009
Strawberrydaiquiri	Balaagha	Greenisland
2008
Baharah	Barshiba	Kasumi
2007
Whazzis	Fann	Lady Stardust
2006
Wasseema	Highway To Glory	Squaw Dance
2005
Echelon	Teeba	Caveral
2004
Coy	Celtic Heroine	Snow Goose
2003
Soldera	Miss Ivanhoe	Pearl Queen
2002
Fraulein	Cozy Maria	Premier Prize
2001
Riberac	Got To Go	Coyote

2000-1998
2000
Papabile	Courting	Alpenglow
1999
Pink Cristal	Diamond White	Susu
1998
Kismah	Brave Kris	Supercal

The Valiant Stakes is a Group flat horse race in Great Britain open to mares and fillies aged three years or older. It is run at Ascot over a distance of 7 furlongs and 213 yards (1,603 metres), and it is scheduled to take place each year in July.

The race was first run 1998 as the Bonusprint Fillies' Conditions Stakes. It was given its current name and awarded Listed status in 2009. The race was moved from mid-August to late July as of 2002. It was upgraded to Group 3 from the 2020 running.

== Records ==
Most successful horse:

- no horse has won this race more than once

Leading jockey (4 wins):

- Ryan Moore – Echelon (2005), Strawberrydaiquiri (2009), Sooraah (2011), Kon Tiki (2026)

Leading trainer (4 wins):

- Sir Michael Stoute – Coy (2004), Echelon (2005), Wasseema (2006), Strawberrydaiquiri (2009)

== Winners ==
Year	Winner	Age	Jockey	Trainer	Time
1998	Kismah	3	Richard Hills	Alec Stewart	1:42.55
1999	Pink Cristal	3	Chris Rutter	Henry Candy	1:43.47
2000	Papabile	3	Ray Cochrane	William Jarvis	1:41.72
2001	Riberac	5	Kevin Darley	Mark Johnston	1:42.37
2002	Fraulein	3	Frankie Dettori	Ed Dunlop	1:43.00
2003	Soldera	3	Jamie Spencer	James Fanshawe	1:45.13
2004	Coy	3	Kieren Fallon	Sir Michael Stoute	1:40.92
2005 (Note: The 2005 running took place at Newbury while Ascot was closed for redevelopment)	Echelon	3	Ryan Moore	Sir Michael Stoute	1:38.39
2006	Wasseema	3	Richard Hills	Sir Michael Stoute	1:39.40
2007	Whazzis	3	Kerrin McEvoy	William Haggas	1:42.31
2008	Baharah	4	Richard Hughes	Gerard Butler	1:39.55
2009	Strawberrydaiquiri	3	Ryan Moore	Sir Michael Stoute	1:42.57
2010	Field Day	3	Martin Dwyer	Brian Meehan	1:41.07
2011	Sooraah	4	Ryan Moore	William Haggas	1:41.69
2012	Thistle Bird	4	James Doyle	Roger Charlton	1:38.65
2013	Zibelina	3	Ahmed Ajtebi	Saeed bin Suroor	1:39.67
2014	Euro Charline	3	Andrea Atzeni	Marco Botti	1:41.88
2015	Evita Peron	4	Richard Kingscote	Ralph Beckett	1:43.60
2016	Red Box (Note: Namroodah finished first in 2016 but was placed third after a stewards' enquiry)	3	Luke Morris	Sir Mark Prescott	1:39.09
2017	On Her Toes	3	Joe Fanning	William Haggas	1:43.87
2018	Clon Coulis	4	Ben Curtis	David Barron	1:41.72
2019	Duneflower	3	Kieran O'Neill	John Gosden	1:41.56
2020	Lady Bowthorpe	4	Kieran Shoemark	William Jarvis	1:40.39
2021	Dreamloper	4	Oisin Murphy	Ed Walker	1:38.34
2022	Jumbly	3	Hollie Doyle	Harry & Roger Charlton	1:42.32
2023	Random Harvest	5	Saffie Osborne	Ed Walker	1:43.71
2024	Friendly Soul	3	Kieran Shoemark	John & Thady Gosden	1:40.21
2025	Cheshire Dancer	4	Billy Loughnane	Hugo Palmer	1:39.30
2026	Kon Tiki	4	Ryan Moore	Jane Chapple-Hyam	1:40.54

== See also ==
- Horse racing in Great Britain
- List of British flat horse races
