= Chartwell Fillies' Stakes =

Flat horse race in Britain

- Class: Group 3
- Location: Lingfield Park; Lingfield, England
- Inaugurated: 1994
- Race type: Flat / Thoroughbred
- Sponsor: William Hill
- Website: Lingfield Park

Race information
- Distance: 7f (1,408 metres)
- Surface: Turf
- Track: Straight
- Qualification: Three-years-old and up fillies and mares
- Weight: 8 st 8 lb (3yo); 9 st 6 lb (4yo+); Penalties; 7 lb for Group 1 winners * 5 lb for Group 2 winners * 3 lb for Group 3 winners * * since 31 August last year
- Purse: £90,000 (2024); 1st: £51,732

Chartwell Fillies' Stakes
2026
Royal Velvet	La Brodeuse	Havana Pusey

Previous years
2025
Great Generation	Jabaara	Spiritual
2024
Great Generation	Stenton Glider	Sirona
2023
Sacred	Sandrine	Queen Aminatu
2022
Lola Showgirl	Pearl Glory	Thunder Beauty
2021
Axana	Bounce The Blues	Isabella Giles

2020-2011
2019
Pretty Baby	Perfection	Devant
2018
Tomyris	Lincoln Rocks	Tajaanus
2017
Mix And Mingle	Qemah	Pirouette
2016
Ashadihan	Light Music	Squash
2015
Majestic Queen	New Providence	Evita Peron
2014
Emerald Star	Veiled Intrigue	Annecdote
2013
Lily's Angel	Kendam	Intense Pink
2012
Chachamaidee	Night Lily	Dysphonia
2011
Perfect Tribute	Flambeau	Pyrrha

2010-2001
2010
Pyrrha	Golden Stream	Reggane
2009
San Sicharia	Baileys Cacao	Please Sing
2008
Sabana Perdida	Verba	Kylayne
2007
Wake Up Maggie	Leopoldine	Creative Mind
2006
Echelon	Chantilly Beauty	Strut
2005
Lucky Spin	Nufoos	Voile
2004
Illustrious Miss	Gonfilia	Golden Nun
2003
Presto Vento	Entrap	Enchanted
2002
Tempting Fate	Marika	Roundtree
2001
Palace Affair	Pearly Gates	Lady Miletrian

2000-1994
2000
Hot Tin Roof	Scarlett Ribbon	May Contessa
1999
Presumed	Rich In Love	Intimaa
1998
Nanoushka	Ikhteyaar	Shuhrah
1997
Supercal	Baked Alaska	Lochangel
1996
Isla Del Rey	Carranita	Christmas Kiss
1995
Daring Destiny	Cheyenne Spirit	Twilight Patrol
1994
Branston Abby	Our Rita	Elrafa Ah

The Chartwell Fillies' Stakes is a Group 3 flat horse race in Great Britain open to fillies and mares aged three years or older. It is run over a distance of 7 furlongs (1,408 metres) at Lingfield Park in May.

== History ==
The event is named after Chartwell, the principal home of Sir Winston Churchill. The property is located several miles to the north-east of Lingfield.

The race was established in 1994, and the first running was won by Branston Abby. It initially held Listed status, and was promoted to Group 3 level in 2004.

== Records ==
Most successful horse (2 wins):

- Great Generation - (2024, 2025)

Leading jockey (3 wins):

- Pat Eddery – Supercal (1997), Nanoushka (1998), Presto Vento (2003)

Leading trainer (3 wins):

- Richard Hannon Sr. – Nanoushka (1998), Presto Vento (2003), Lucky Spin (2005)
- Chris Wall - Wake Up Maggie (2007), Pyrrha (2010), Mix And Mingle (2017)

== Winners ==
Year	Winner	Age	Jockey	Trainer	Time
1994	Branston Abby	5	Michael Roberts	Mark Johnston	1:26.90
1995	Daring Destiny	4	Jason Tate	Karl Burke	1:23.99
1996	Isla del Rey	4	Frankie Dettori	Saeed bin Suroor	1:21.34
1997	Supercal	3	Pat Eddery	David Elsworth	1:26.68
1998	Nanoushka	3	Pat Eddery	Richard Hannon Sr.	1:20.57
1999	Presumed	3	Seb Sanders	Peter Makin	1:21.50
2000	Hot Tin Roof	4	Kieren Fallon	Tim Easterby	1:25.33
2001	Palace Affair	3	Steve Drowne	Toby Balding	1:22.26
2002	Tempting Fate	4	Jamie Spencer	Saeed bin Suroor	1:23.02
2003	Presto Vento	3	Pat Eddery	Richard Hannon Sr.	1:24.22
2004	Illustrious Miss	3	Tom Queally	David Loder	1:27.77
2005	Lucky Spin	4	Richard Hughes	Richard Hannon Sr.	1:24.01
2006	Echelon	4	Kieren Fallon	Sir Michael Stoute	1:21.75
2007	Wake Up Maggie	4	Richard Hughes	Chris Wall	1:22.42
2008	Sabana Perdida	5	Christophe Lemaire	Alain de Royer-Dupré	1:20.51
2009	San Sicharia	4	Pat Smullen	Joanna Morgan	1:20.60
2010	Pyrrha	4	Alan Munro	Chris Wall	1:22.16
2011	Perfect Tribute	3	Luke Morris	Clive Cox	1:20.05
2012 (Note: The 2012, 2016 & 2023 runnings took place on Lingfield's all-weather track)	Chachamaidee	5	Tom Queally	Sir Henry Cecil	1:23.30
2013	Lily's Angel	4	Gary Carroll	Ger Lyons	1:25.41
2014	Emerald Star	3	Daniele Porcu	Peter Schiergen	1:24.15
2015	Majestic Queen	5	William Buick	Tracey Collins	1:24.46
2016	Ashadihan	3	Jamie Spencer	Kevin Ryan	1:24.51
2017	Mix And Mingle	4	Ryan Moore	Chris Wall	1:22.31
2018	Tomyris	4	Frankie Dettori	Roger Varian	1:22.71
2019	Pretty Baby	4	James Doyle	William Haggas	1:24.36
	no race 2020 (Note: The 2020 running was cancelled because of the COVID-19 pandemic in the United Kingdom)
2021	Axana	5	Jason Watson	Andreas Wöhler	1:24.07
2022	Lola Showgirl	5	Tom Marquand	David Loughnanne	1:21.86
2023	Sacred	5	Ryan Moore	William Haggas	1:21.50
2024	Great Generation	3	Marco Ghiani	Marco Botti	1:22.22
2025	Great Generation	4	Marco Ghiani	Marco Botti	1:20.66
2026	Royal Velvet	5	William Buick	William Knight	1:22:76

== See also ==
- Horse racing in Great Britain
- List of British flat horse races
