= Coral Distaff =

Flat horse race in Britain

Coral Distaff
2026
Secret Of Life	Silenciosa	Estissa

Previous years
2025
Blue Bolt	Cajole	Suite Francaise
2024
Spiritual	Indelible	Soprano
2023
Mystic Pearl	Stenton Glider	Bridestones
2022
Grande Dame	Oscula	Heredia
2021
Auria	Seattle Rock	Glesga Gal

2020-2011
2019
Hidden Message	Encapsulation	Muchly
2018
Awesometank	Desert Diamond	Preening
2017
Tisbutadream	Queen of Time	Dancing Breeze
2016
Light Up Our World	Wilamina	Sharaakah
2015
Blond Me	Montalcino	Bella Nostalgia
2014
Belle D'or	Wee Jean	Crowley's Law
2013
Integral	Light Up My Life	Private Alexander
2012
Falls Of Lora	Ladys First	Bana Wu
2011
Nahrain	Primevere	Cape Dollar

2010-2003
2010
Virginia Hall	Fontley	Lady Darshaan
2009
Strawberrydaiquiri	Say No Now	Wadaat
2008
Rosaleen	Visit	Illusion
2007
Selinka	Barshiba	Treat
2006
Star Cluster	Silver Touch	Expensive
2005
Bon Nuit	Echelon	Squaw Dance
2004
Antediluvian	Snow Goose	Ithaca
2003
Favourable Terms	Miss Ivanhoe	Londonnetdotcom

The Coral Distaff is a Listed flat horse race in Great Britain open to fillies aged three years only. It is run at Sandown over a distance of 1 mile (1,609 metres), and it is scheduled to take place each year in July. It takes place at the same meeting as the Eclipse Stakes.

The race was first run in 2003 as the Distaff Stakes.

== Winners ==
Year	Winner	Jockey	Trainer	Time
2003	Favourable Terms	Kieren Fallon	Sir Michael Stoute	1:42.23
2004	Antediluvian	Kieren Fallon	Sir Michael Stoute	1:44.59
2005	Bon Nuit	John Egan	Geoff Wragg	1:42.59
2006	Star Cluster	Richard Hughes	Henry Cecil	1:42.24
2007	Selinka	Ryan Moore	Richard Hannon Sr.	1:42.30
2008	Rosaleen	Frankie Dettori	Brian Meehan	1:41.98
2009	Strawberrydaiquiri	Ryan Moore	Sir Michael Stoute	1:42.39
2010	Virginia Hall	Seb Sanders	Mark Prescott	1:40.42
2011	Nahrain	Neil Callan	Roger Varian	1:41.83
2012	Falls Of Lora	Frankie Dettori	Mahmood Al Zarooni	1:43.46
2013	Integral	Ryan Moore	Sir Michael Stoute	1:39.85
2014	Belle D'or	William Buick	John Gosden	1:41.60
2015	Blond Me	David Probert	Andrew Balding	1:40.76
2016	Light Up Our World	Pat Dobbs	Richard Hannon Jr.	1:45.50
2017	Tisbutadream	Silvestre de Sousa	David Elsworth	1:41.32
2018	Awesometank	James Doyle	William Haggas	1:41.42
2019	Hidden Message	Oisin Murphy	William Haggas	1:40.11
	no race 2020 (Note: The 2020 running was cancelled because of the COVID-19 pandemic in the United Kingdom)
2021	Auria	Oisin Murphy	Andrew Balding	1:44.19
2022	Grande Dame	Ryan Moore	John and Thady Gosden	1:41.58
2023	Mystic Pearl	Tom Marquand	William Haggas	1:43.85
2024	Spiritual	Richard Kingscote	John and Thady Gosden	1:41.58
2025	Blue Bolt	Colin Keane	Andrew Balding	1:41.67
2026	Secret Of Life	Rossa Ryan	Ralph Beckett	1:42.46

== See also ==
- Horse racing in Great Britain
- List of British flat horse races
