= Gonzales (horse) =

American-bred Thoroughbred racehorse

- Sire: Vaguely Noble
- Grandsire: Vienna
- Dam: Gazala
- Damsire: Dark Star
- Sex: Stallion
- Foaled: 27 January 1977
- Country: United States
- Colour: Bay
- Breeder: Nelson Bunker Hunt
- Owner: Robert Sangster; Gainesway Farm
- Trainer: Vincent O'Brien; Charles E. Whittingham
- Record: 10: 4-1-2

Major wins
- Gallinule Stakes (1980); Blandford Stakes (1980); Irish St Leger (1980)

Awards
- Timeform rating 120 (1980)

Gonzales (27 January 1977 – after 1996) was an American-bred Thoroughbred racehorse and sire. Unraced as a two-year-old he established himself as a high-class stayer in the following year winning the Gallinule Stakes, Blandford Stakes, and Irish St Leger as well as starting favourite for the Prix du Jockey Club. He was then sent to the United States where he was campaigned for two years to little effect. He made little impact as a breeding stallion.

== Background ==
Gonzales was a "big" bay horse with a white star bred in Kentucky by Nelson Bunker Hunt. As a yearling he was put up for auction and sold for $750,000 to representatives of the British businessman Robert Sangster. He was sent to Europe where he was trained by Vincent O'Brien at Ballydoyle

His sire, Vaguely Noble, won the Prix de l'Arc de Triomphe in 1968 before becoming a successful breeding stallion whose best progeny included Dahlia, Exceller and Empery. Gonzales' dam Gazala was an exceptional racehorse who won the Poule d'Essai des Pouliches and the Prix de Diane in 1967. She was even better as a broodmare producing several good winners including Youth and Gonzales' full-brother Mississippian (Grand Critérium).

== Racing career ==
=== 1980: three-year-old season ===
Gonzales was not raced as a juvenile and began his track career in a minor race over ten furlongs at Leopardstown Racecourse in April 1980 and won by six lengths. He was then moved up in class and distance for the Gallinule Stakes over one and a half miles at the Curragh in May in which he was ridden by Lester Piggott and won by three lengths from Dermot Weld-trained Good Thyne. Piggott was again in the saddle on 8 June when Gonzales was sent to France and started 9/4 favourite for the Prix du Jockey Club over 2400 metres at Chantilly Racecourse. After being restrained towards the rear of the field he stayed on steadily in the straight but never looked likely to win and finished fifth behind Policeman.

After a break of three months, Gonzales returned in the Blandford Stakes over one and a half miles at the Curragh in which he was ridden by Tommy Murphy. He started the odds-on favourite and won by a neck from the five-year-old mare My Hollow. Later that month he was stepped back up to Group 1 class for the Joe McGrath Memorial Stakes over ten furlongs at Leopardstown and finished fifth behind his four-year-old stablemate Gregorian, looking to be outpaced in the closing stages. On 11 October, Gonzales was stepped up in distance for the Irish St Leger over one and three-quarter miles at the Curragh in which he was partnered as in his last start by Raymond Carroll. Racing on soft ground he was made the 4/7 favourite ahead of Ramian (third in the Irish Derby) and Good Thyne whilst the other five runners were Capitano, Sheringham, Prancing Prince, El Cito and Sir Mordred. After tracking the leaders in the early stages Gonzales went to the front half a mile from the finish and drew away from his rivals in the straight to win easily by five lengths from Good Thyne with another three lengths back to El Cito in third place.

At the end of the year, the independent Timeform organization gave Gonzales a rating of 120, fifteen pounds inferior to their best stayer Le Moss and seventeen pounds behind their Horse of the Year Moorestyle.

=== Later career ===
In 1981 Gonzales was sent to the United States where he was trained by Charles E. Whittingham and raced in the colors of Gainesway Farm. In that summer he ran three times at Hollywood Park Racetrack, running third in two allowance races and then finishing unplaced behind Galaxy Libra in the Sunset Handicap. He remained in training as a five-year-old in 1982 but made only one track appearance, running second in an allowance at Santa Anita Park in February.

== Stud record ==
At the end of his racing career, Gonzales was retired to become a breeding stallion in the United States, before being returned to Europe where he was based in Germany from 1991. He does not appear to have sired any significant winners in either location.

== Pedigree ==
Pedigree of Gonzales (USA), bay stallion, 1977
Sire Vaguely Noble (IRE) 1965	Vienna (GB); 1957	Aureole	Hyperion
Sire Vaguely Noble (IRE) 1965	Vienna (GB); 1957	Aureole	Angelola
Sire Vaguely Noble (IRE) 1965	Vienna (GB); 1957	Turkish Blood	Turkhan
Sire Vaguely Noble (IRE) 1965	Vienna (GB); 1957	Turkish Blood	Rusk
Sire Vaguely Noble (IRE) 1965	Noble Lassie (GB); 1956	Nearco	Pharos
Sire Vaguely Noble (IRE) 1965	Noble Lassie (GB); 1956	Nearco	Nogara
Sire Vaguely Noble (IRE) 1965	Noble Lassie (GB); 1956	Belle Sauvage	Big Game
Sire Vaguely Noble (IRE) 1965	Noble Lassie (GB); 1956	Belle Sauvage	Tropical Sun
Dam Gazala (FR) 1964	Dark Star (USA); 1950	Royal Gem	Dhoti
Dam Gazala (FR) 1964	Dark Star (USA); 1950	Royal Gem	French Gem
Dam Gazala (FR) 1964	Dark Star (USA); 1950	Isolde	Bull Dog
Dam Gazala (FR) 1964	Dark Star (USA); 1950	Isolde	Fiji
Dam Gazala (FR) 1964	Belle Angevine (FR); 1957	L'Amiral	Admiral Drake
Dam Gazala (FR) 1964	Belle Angevine (FR); 1957	L'Amiral	Hurrylor
Dam Gazala (FR) 1964	Belle Angevine (FR); 1957	Bella	Canot
Dam Gazala (FR) 1964	Belle Angevine (FR); 1957	Bella	Bayan Kara (Family: 8-a)
