= Lord Glitters =

French-bred Thoroughbred racehorse

- Sire: Whipper
- Grandsire: Miesque's Son
- Dam: Lady Glitters
- Damsire: Homme de Loi
- Sex: Gelding
- Foaled: 20 April 2013
- Country: France
- Colour: Grey
- Breeder: SCA Elevage de Tourgeville
- Owner: Ecurie du Trieux; Geoff & Sandra Turnbull
- Trainer: Christophe Lotoux; David O'Meara
- Record: 46:11-10-5
- Earnings: £2,217,186

Major wins
- Balmoral Handicap (2017); Strensall Stakes (2018); Queen Anne Stakes (2019); Singspiel Stakes (2021, 2022); Jebel Hatta (2021)

Honours
- Lord Glitters Handicap at Meydan Racecourse

Lord Glitters (foaled 20 April 2013) is a retired French-bred Thoroughbred racehorse. He was trained in France where he won four races before being sold, gelded, and sent to race in England as a four-year-old where he won the valuable Balmoral Handicap in October 2017. In 2018 he showed very good form over one mile, winning the Strensall Stakes and being placed in the Lincoln Handicap, Queen Anne Stakes and Sussex Stakes. As a six-year-old he finished third in the Dubai Turf before recording his biggest victory when he took the Queen Anne Stakes at the second attempt. In 2021 he secured a second Group 1 success, winning the Jebel Hatta, and won the first of two back-to-back victories in the Singspiel Stakes. His retirement was announced in July 2022.

== Background ==
Lord Glitters is a grey gelding bred in France by SCA Elevage de Tourgeville. As a yearling in October 2014 he was offered for sale at Deauville and bought for €25,000 by Ecurie du Trieux. The colt was sent into training with Christophe Lotoux.

He was sired by Whipper, a top-class sprinter-miler who won the Prix Jacques le Marois in 2004 and the Prix Maurice de Gheest in 2005. The best of his other offspring have included the Prix du Moulin winner Recoletos. Lord Glitters' dam Lady Glitters showed modest racing ability, finishing second twice and third three times in ten starts. She was descended from the Preis der Diana winner Ordenstreue, making her a close relative of the German Derby winners Ordos and Orofino.

== Racing career ==
=== 2016: three-year-old season ===
Lord Glitters was ridden in his first five races by Arnaud Bourgeais. He was unraced as a juvenile and began his track career by finishing second in a maiden race over 1800 metres on heavy ground at Morlaix on 3 April 2017. He then finished second again in a similar event at Chateaubriant before recording his first success in a maiden at the same track on 28 May, winning by two lengths from ten opponents. On 19 June he followed up in a minor race over 2000 metres at Le Lion-d'Angers, coming home 3 1/2 lengths clear of his two rivals. and was then moved up in class for the Listed Grand Prix du Lion d'Angers in which he ran second to the favourite Floodlight. He failed to maintain his good run of form when he finished last of the five runners in a minor race at Deauville Racecourse on 31 August. Lord Glitters ended his first season at Deauville in November when he finished fourth of the thirteen runners in a minor event on the synthetic Polytrack surface.

=== 2017: four-year-old season ===
Lord Glitters was ridden by Christophe Soumillon on his first start of 2017 when he started at odds of 9.7/1 for the Prix du Bu on the polytrack at Chantilly Racecourse on 20 April and won "cosily" by two lengths from Alberello. He returned to the turf in the Prix Lavandin at Saint-Cloud Racecourse on 15 May and won again, coming home 2 1/2 lengths clear of his nine opponents at odds of 2/1.

In July Lord Glitters returned to the Deauville sales ring and was bought for $306,477 by Jason Kelly & Elwick Stud. He was then gelded and sent to race in England where he was trained by David O'Meara at Upper Helmsley, North Yorkshire. He thenceforth carried the colours of Elwick Stud's owners Geoff and Sarah Turnbull.

On his first appearance for his new connections, Lord Glitters carried 129 pounds in a valuable Handicap race over seven furlongs at Ascot Racecourse on 7 October and finished second of the eighteen runners, beaten half a length by Accidental Agent. Two weeks later at the same track, the gelding was ridden by Daniel Tudhope when he started 3/1 favourite for the Balmoral Handicap. After racing towards the rear of the field he produced a strong late run to take the lead in the final strides and won by a neck from the Royal Hunt Cup winner GM Hopkins. On his final race of the season Lord Glitters started favourite for the Listed Ben Marshall Stakes at Newmarket Racecourse in November but was beaten a neck into second place by Brace Zolo.

=== 2018: five-year-old season ===
In the first half of 2018 Lord Glitters ran consistently well without being able to win. On his debut he carried top weight of 136 pounds in the Lincoln Handicap at Doncaster Racecourse in March and finished second to Addeybb, a gelding who won the Sandown Mile on his next start. At Royal Ascot in June he stepped up to Group 1 level and finished a half-length second to Accidental Agent in the Queen Anne Stakes, staying on strongly in the closing stages after struggling to obtain a clear run. In the Summer Mile Stakes at the same track a month later he was beaten a neck by the four-year-old Beat The Bank. After three consecutive second places Lord Glitters finished third to Lightning Spear and Expert Eye in the Sussex Stakes at Goodwood Racecourse, coming with a strong late run from the rear of the field.

On 25 August Lord Glitters was dropped to Group 3 class for the Strensall Stakes over 1 mile 177 yards at York Racecourse and started the 2/1 favourite against seven opponents. Ridden by Tudhope, he was restrained in the early stages before staying on strongly, taking the lead inside the final furlong and winning by half a length from Mustashry. After the race David O'Meara said "There was a small concern about going up a little bit in trip whether firstly he'd settle and secondly would he stay, but he did it well and he was well on top at the end. He's a very good horse. He's been unlucky not to have won a Group One in this country". The gelding was then sent to Canada to contest the Grade I Woodbine Mile on 15 September but never looked likely to win and finished sixth to Oscar Performance. He ended the season in the Queen Elizabeth II Stakes at Ascot in October when he came home sixth behind Roaring Lion beaten two and three quarter length behind the winner after making steady progress in the last quarter mile.

=== 2019: six-year-old season ===
On his 2019 debut Lord Glitters was sent to the United Arab Emirates to contest the Dubai Turf over 1800 metres at Meydan Racecourse on 30 March in which he started a 22/1 outsider and came from the rear of the field with a sustained late run to take third place behind the Japanese mares Almond Eye and Vivlos. He returned to Europe for the Lockinge Stakes on 18 May at Newbury Racecourse but ran very poorly and came home thirteenth of the fourteen runners, more than 20 lengths behind the winner Mustashry. At Royal Ascot on 18 June, with Tudhope in the saddle, Lord Glitters ran for the second time in the Queen Anne Stakes and started at odds of 14/1 in a sixteen-runner field. His old rivals Accidental Agent, Beat The Bank and Mustashry were again in opposition while the other contenders included Barney Roy (who started favourite), Laurens, Romanised, One Master and Dream Castle (Jebel Hatta). Lord Glitters was restrained at the rear of the field as Mythical Magic set the pace, but began to make progress two furlongs out One Master went to the front. The grey gelding headed One Master inside the final furlong and held off the sustained challenge of Beat The Bank to win by a neck. After the race Tudhope said "He deserves to land a big one and is a super horse on his day. When things go right for him, he's very good. David said to ride him as cold as I could and be brave on him, but if there's anywhere you can do that it's here—that last furlong is a long way. I got a lovely split and the race panned out perfectly."

Lord Glitters failed to win in his four remaining starts on 2019. He finished fifth behind Too Darn Hot in the Sussex Stakes at Goodwood on 31 July and was then moved up in distance for the International Stakes over 10 1/2 furlongs at York three weeks later and came home sixth of nine runners, beaten four lengths by the winner Japan. In October he ran for the second time in the Queen Elizabeth II Stakes at Ascot but looked unhappy on the heavy ground and finished eighth. For his final run of the year the gelding was sent to California for the Breeders' Cup Mile at Santa Anita Park on 2 November when he finished ninth after failing to recover from a slow start.

In the 2019 World's Best Racehorse Rankings Lord Glitters was given a rating of 117, making him the 112th best racehorse in the world.

=== 2020: seven-year-old season ===
The 2020 flat racing season in Britain was disrupted by the COVID-19 pandemic and Lord Glitters did not appear on the track until 10 July when he finished fourth behind Mohaather in the Group 2 Summer Mile Stakes at Ascot. He then ran twice at York, running third in the York Stakes over 10 1/2 furlongs on 25 July and then finishing third again when favourite for the Strensall Stakes on 22 August. In the ten furlong Doonside Cup at Ayr Racecourse in September he kept on well from the rear of the field to take second place, beaten three quarters of a length by the winner Addeybb. In October he made his third attempt to win the Queen Elizabeth II Stakes and finished sixth behind The Revenant. He ended the season with a trip to Bahrain where he finished a close fifth behind the locally trained Simsir in the Bahrain International Trophy over 2000 metres at Sakhir Racecourse on 20 November.

=== 2021: eight-year-old season ===
Lord Glitters began his 2021 campaign in Dubai, as he had done in 2019, and made his seasonal debut in the Group 2 Singspiel Stakes over 1800 metres at Meydan on 21 January. Ridden by the Dutch jockey Adrie de Vries he went off the 8/1 fourth choice behind Military March (Autumn Stakes), Zakouski (Zabeel Mile) and Kinross (Hyde Stakes) in a field of eleven which also included Dream Castle (Jebel Hatta) and Mythical Magic (Zabeel Mile). After being restrained towards the rear, the gelding made good progress to take the lead 300 metres from the finish before drawing away to win by three lengths from Zakouski and record his first victory for nineteen months. David O'Meara commented: "He was brilliant. The race fell right for him but Adrie gave him a great ride. He ran a lovely race in Bahrain in November when it wasn't run to suit. The fact he's eight now but is still able to run to that sort of level is amazing. That was a hell of run and we know he likes the track." Three weeks later, over the same course and distance, the gelding finished third behind Zakouski and Court House in the Group 2 Al Rashidiya, beaten less than a length by the winner.

=== 2022: nine-year-old season ===
Lord Glitters once again began the season in Dubai, finishing fourth in the Al Rashidiya before taking the Singspiel Stakes for the second time, beating the favourite Royal Fleet by a length. He then started favourite for the Jebel Hatta, but finished lame in sixth place five lengths behind winner Alfareeq. He returned to England to run in the Brigadier Gerard Stakes at Sandown on 26 May. He made no impression in the race, finishing last of five runners, thirteen lengths behind Bay Bridge. It was to be his final race. In July 2022 it was announced that Lord Glitters was retiring to pasture at his owners' Durham stud.

== Pedigree ==
Pedigree of Lord Glitters (FR), grey gelding 2013
Sire Whipper (USA) 2001	Miesque's Son (USA); 1992	Mr Prospector	Raise A Native
Sire Whipper (USA) 2001	Miesque's Son (USA); 1992	Mr Prospector	Gold Digger
Sire Whipper (USA) 2001	Miesque's Son (USA); 1992	Miesque	Nureyev
Sire Whipper (USA) 2001	Miesque's Son (USA); 1992	Miesque	Pasadoble
Sire Whipper (USA) 2001	Myth To Reality (FR); 1986	Sadler's Wells (USA)	Northern Dancer (CAN)
Sire Whipper (USA) 2001	Myth To Reality (FR); 1986	Sadler's Wells (USA)	Fairy Bridge
Sire Whipper (USA) 2001	Myth To Reality (FR); 1986	Milieme (IRE)	Mill Reef (USA)
Sire Whipper (USA) 2001	Myth To Reality (FR); 1986	Milieme (IRE)	Hardiemma (GB)
Dam Lady Glitters (FR) 1997	Homme de Loi (IRE); 1989	Law Society (USA)	Alleged
Dam Lady Glitters (FR) 1997	Homme de Loi (IRE); 1989	Law Society (USA)	Bold Bikini
Dam Lady Glitters (FR) 1997	Homme de Loi (IRE); 1989	Our Village	Ballymore
Dam Lady Glitters (FR) 1997	Homme de Loi (IRE); 1989	Our Village	Epona
Dam Lady Glitters (FR) 1997	Marie Glitters (FR); 1988	Crystal Glitters (USA)	Blushing Groom (FR)
Dam Lady Glitters (FR) 1997	Marie Glitters (FR); 1988	Crystal Glitters (USA)	Tales To Tell
Dam Lady Glitters (FR) 1997	Marie Glitters (FR); 1988	Marie de Vez	Crystal Palace
Dam Lady Glitters (FR) 1997	Marie Glitters (FR); 1988	Marie de Vez	Ordenstreue (GB) (Family: 8-a)
