= Marco Ghiani =

Italian jockey

Personal information
- Born: 7 February 1999 (age 27) Oristano, Sardinia
- Occupation: Jockey

Horse racing career
- Sport: Horse racing

Major racing wins
- Major races Derby Italiano (2025)

Racing awards
- British flat racing Champion Apprentice (2021)
- Updated on 24 October 2023

Marco Ghiani is a flat racing jockey, who was 2021 British flat racing Champion Apprentice.

Ghiani, who is not from a racing background, grew up in Sardinia and was encouraged to pursue his dreams of becoming a jockey by Italian jockey Dario Vargiu. He left Sardinia for Newmarket and attended a course at the British Racing School.

He started out riding for Luca Cumani in 2017, but joined the stable of Stuart Williams as apprentice when Cumani retired. He had his first race rides in 2018, getting 1 second and 3 thirds from 11 rides. Then, in 2019, he had his first winner, ending the season with 22 wins from 131 races. In 2020, it was 19 from 204.

In 2021, he became Champion Apprentice, topping 100 winners for the year and winning nearly £900,000 in prize money. During the season, he rode out his apprentice claim on 1 July 2021, winning on the Hugo Palmer-trained Surprise Picture. His most successful partnership was with the Saeed Bin Suroor trained Real World, on whom he got his first Royal Ascot win in the Royal Hunt Cup, before following up in the Listed Steventon Stakes and Group 3 Strensall Stakes. He won the 2021 Lester Award for Apprentice Jockey of the Year.

He won fewer races in 2022, ending the season with 64, but among them were the Listed Premio d'Italia Tattersalls on Cime Tempestose and Queen Charlotte Fillies' Stakes on Soft Whisper, again for Saeed Bin Suroor. His career as "a rising star of the weighing room" was not helped by a positive cocaine test following a race at Newcastle on 25 August. He was stood down in September, and his six-month ban was backdated to then when handed out in November.

Ghiani was appointed as the retained rider for leisure tycoon Peter Harris for the 2023 season. A partnership with Harris's Mill Stream, trained by Jane Chapple-Hyam, brought him two big French races within a few weeks in August - the Prix Moonlight Cloud and Prix de Meautry. Ghiani spoke of his hope of winning his first Group 1 on him in the Haydock Sprint Cup, but in the end, though disputing the lead briefly, he finished sixth. He ended the season 56th in the jockeys' championship with 25 winners from 239 rides in the championship period. In November 2023, he won the Group 3 St. Leger Italiano on Roberto Escobarr for trainer Michael Appleby.

In March 2024, Ghiani was banned for 34 days (9 suspended) for breaching whip rules on five occasions in the previous six months. He finished the year on 66 winners, including two Group 3 wins in England (the Chartwell Fillies' Stakes and the Sceptre Stakes, both on Great Generation for Marco Botti) and two wins in listed races in Italy.

May 2025 saw another victory for Ghiani on Great Generation in the Chartwell Stakes. On 2 June 2025, he achieved his first success in a Group 2 race when he rode Molveno in the Derby Italiano for Botti.

== Personal life ==
Ghiani and his partner Brooke Brown have a son, Louis, born in May 2021.

== See also ==
- List of jockeys
