= Strensall Stakes =

Flat horse race in Britain

- Class: Group 3
- Location: York Racecourse; York, England
- Race type: Flat
- Sponsor: Sky Bet / Symphony Group
- Website: York

Race information
- Distance: 1m 177y (1,771 metres)
- Surface: Turf
- Track: Left-handed
- Qualification: Three-years-old and up
- Weight: 9 st 0 lb (3yo); 9 st 7 lb (4yo+); Allowances; 3 lb for fillies and mares Penalties; 7 lb for Group 1 winners * 5 lb for Group 2 winners * 3 lb for Group 3 winners * * after 2024
- Purse: £170,000 (2025); 1st: £96,407

Strensall Stakes
2026
Archivist	Saber Strike	Persica

Previous years
2025
King Of Cities	Boiling Point	Skukuza
2024
See The Fire	Phantom Flight	Checkandchallenge
2023
Spirit Dancer	El Drama	Flight Plan
2022
Alflaila	Finest Sound	Marie's Diamond
2021
Real World	Lord Glitters	Duke Of Hazzard

2020-2011
2020
Certain Lad	Epic Hero	Lord Glitters
2019
Zaaki	Bangkok	Space Traveller
2018
Lord Glitters	Mustashry	Chief Ironside
2017
Mustashry	Forest Ranger	Sovereign Debt
2016
Scottish	Yorker	Custom Cut
2015
Mondialiste	Mutakayyef	Basem
2014
Custom Cut	Trade Storm	Lady Lara
2013
City Style	Danadana	Gabrial
2012
Dubai Prince	Side Glance	Tazahum
2011
Green Destiny	Tazahum	Dux Scholar

2010-2001
2010
Rio De La Plata	Rainbow Peak	Kings Gambit
2009
Palavicini	Dream Lodge	Perfect Stride
2007
Echo of Light	Halicarnassus	Kandidate
2006
Echo of Light	Stage Gift	Olympian Odyssey
2005
Mullins Bay	Andean	Maraahel
2004
Red Bloom	Salselon	Imperial Dancer
2003
Naheef	Eventuail	Akshar
2002
Binary File	Bourgainville	Desert Deer
2001
Momentum	Summoner	Snowstorm

2000-1991
2000
Right Wing	Autonomy	Fanaar
1999
Gold Academy	Diamond White	Spindrift
1998
Great Dane	Silence Reigns	Weet-A-Minute
1997
Winter Romance	Weet-A-Minute	Balalaika
1996
Even Top	Tamhid	Missile
1995
Triarius	Sonic Boy	Naked Welcome
1994
Lower Egypt	Shintillo	Fraam
1993
Muhtarram	Port Lucaya	Colway Rock
1992
Spartan Shareef	Badawi	Polish Blue
1991
Shaima	St Ninian	Lifewatch Vision

1990-1988
1990
Va Toujours	Message Pad	Negligent
1989
Opening Verse	Greenwich Papillon	Batshoof
1988
Kingsfold Flame	Hoy	Jamarj

The Strensall Stakes is a Group 3 flat horse race in Great Britain open to horses aged three years or older. It is run at York over a distance of 1 mile and 177 yards (1,771 metres), and it is scheduled to take place each year in August.

== History ==
The event is named after Strensall, a village located several miles to the north of York. It was formerly restricted to fillies, and it used to be contested over 7 furlongs. For a period it was classed at Listed level, and it was usually staged in early September.

The race was opened to male horses and extended to its present distance in 1987. It was promoted to Group 3 status in 2003.

The Strensall Stakes became part of the Ebor Festival in 2008, but that year's running was abandoned because of a waterlogged course. It now takes place on the final day of the meeting, which is held over four days in mid August.

== Records ==
Most successful horse (2 wins):

- Echo of Light – 2006, 2007

Leading jockey (8 wins):

- Frankie Dettori – Shaima (1991), Lower Egypt (1994), Triarius (1995), Naheef (2003), Echo of Light (2006, 2007), Rio de la Plata (2010), Dubai Prince (2012)

Leading trainer (6 wins):

- Saeed bin Suroor – Triarius (1995), Naheef (2003), Echo of Light (2006, 2007), Rio de la Plata (2010), Real World (2021)

== Winners ==
Year	Winner	Age	Jockey	Trainer	Time
1966	Berkeley Springs	3	Geoff Lewis	Ian Balding	1:33.20
1967	Royal Saint	3	George Moore	Noel Murless	1:30.00
1968	Kursaal	3	Peter Robinson	Teddy Lambton	1:28.60
1969	Nevetta	3	Lionel Brown	Dick Peacock	1:24.80
1970	Nana's Girl	3	Brian Taylor	Harvey Leader	1:29.60
1971	Magic Flute	3	Geoff Lewis	Noel Murless	1:26.80
1972	Pearl Star	3	Tony Murray	Ken Cundell	1:26.30
1973	Silk Stocking	3	Willie Carson	J Clayton	1:27.20
1974	Flashy	3	Des Cullen	Harry Wragg	1:45.37
1975	Joking Apart	3	Joe Mercer	Ian Balding	1:39.35
1976	Sauceboat	4	Lester Piggott	Noel Murless	1:42.93
1977	Mrs McArdy	3	Eddie Hide	Mick Easterby	1:26.13
1978	Spring In Deepsea	3	Greville Starkey	Luca Cumani	1:28.94
1979	Petty Purse	4	John Reid	Fulke Johnson Houghton	1:26.22
1980	Luck Of The Draw	3	Willie Carson	Dick Hern	1:22.72
1981	Premier Rose	4	Peter Madden	Paul Cole	1:23.83
1982	Triple Tipple	3	Willie Carson	Luca Cumani	1:25.03
1983	Silverdip	3	Pat Eddery	Ian Balding	1:23.22
1984	Capricorn Belle	3	Rae Guest	Luca Cumani	1:28.24
1985	Raabihah	3	Paul d'Arcy	Harry Thomson Jones	1:29.15
1986	Entrancing	3	Willie Carson	John Dunlop	1:28.77
1987	Lockton	3	Michael Hills	Jeremy Hindley	1:53.61
1988	Kingsfold Flame	5	Richard Fox	Michael Haynes	1:58.66
1989	Opening Verse	3	Steve Cauthen	Henry Cecil	1:51.20
1990	Va Toujours	3	Mark Rimmer	Hugh Collingridge	1:51.54
1991	Shaima	3	Frankie Dettori	Luca Cumani	1:52.00
1992	Spartan Shareef	3	Michael Roberts	Clive Brittain	1:53.31
1993	Muhtarram	4	Willie Carson	John Gosden	1:51.19
1994	Lower Egypt	4	Frankie Dettori	John Gosden	1:57.00
1995	Triarius	5	Frankie Dettori	Saeed bin Suroor	1:51.36
1996	Even Top	3	Richard Quinn	Mark Tompkins	1:50.33
1997	Winter Romance	4	Michael Hills	Ed Dunlop	1:59.90
1998	Great Dane	3	Kieren Fallon	Henry Cecil	1:52.09
1999	Gold Academy	3	Pat Eddery	Richard Hannon Sr.	1:47.03
2000	Right Wing	6	John Reid	John Dunlop	1:50.43
2001	Momentum	3	Michael Hills	John Hills	1:50.91
2002	Binary File	4	Kieren Fallon	John Gosden	1:49.60
2003	Naheef	4	Frankie Dettori	Saeed bin Suroor	1:50.18
2004	Red Bloom	3	Kevin Darley	Sir Michael Stoute	1:54.74
2005	Mullins Bay	4	Kieren Fallon	Aidan O'Brien	1:49.19
2006	Echo of Light	4	Frankie Dettori	Saeed bin Suroor	1:50.74
2007	Echo of Light	5	Frankie Dettori	Saeed bin Suroor	1:46.76
2008	Abandoned due to waterlogging
2009	Palavicini	3	Eddie Ahern	John Dunlop	1:51.06
2010	Rio de la Plata	5	Frankie Dettori	Saeed bin Suroor	1:49.04
2011	Green Destiny	4	Kieren Fallon	William Haggas	1:51.88
2012	Dubai Prince	4	Frankie Dettori	Mahmood Al Zarooni	1:47.73
2013	City Style	7	Silvestre de Sousa	Charlie Appleby	1:51.75
2014	Custom Cut	5	Daniel Tudhope	David O'Meara	1:50.83
2015	Mondialiste	5	Daniel Tudhope	David O'Meara	1:50.33
2016	Scottish	4	William Buick	Charlie Appleby	1:46.61
2017	Mustashry	4	Jim Crowley	Sir Michael Stoute	1:47.85
2018	Lord Glitters	5	Daniel Tudhope	David O'Meara	1:48.03
2019	Zaaki	4	Ryan Moore	Sir Michael Stoute	1:48.68
2020	Certain Lad	4	Hollie Doyle	Mick Channon	1:52.39
2021	Real World	4	Marco Ghiani	Saeed bin Suroor	1:47.66
2022	Alflaila	3	Jim Crowley	Owen Burrows	1:48.02
2023	Spirit Dancer	6	Oisin Orr	Richard Fahey	1:49.31
2024	See The Fire	3	Oisin Murphy	Andrew Balding	1:49.96
2025	King Of Cities	3	Sean Levey	Richard Hannon Jr.	1:49.73
2026	Archivist	4	Callum Rodriguez	Hamad Al Jehani	1:49.50

== See also ==
- Horse racing in Great Britain
- List of British flat horse races
