= Ebor Festival =

Flat racing meet in Yorkshire, England

The Ebor Festival is a four-day horse race meeting held at York Racecourse in York, England, each August. The 2024 Ebor Festival took place from 21 to 24 August.

The Ebor Festival was established in 1843 with the first running of the Ebor Handicap.

Each of the four days has feature races:

- Wednesday is called Juddmonte International Day and features the Juddmonte International, the Great Voltigeur Stakes and the Acomb Stakes.
- Thursday is Ladies' Day and features the Lowther Stakes and the Yorkshire Oaks.
- Friday is Nunthorpe Day and features the Nunthorpe Stakes, the Gimcrack Stakes and the Strensall Stakes.
- Saturday is Ebor Day and features the Ebor Handicap and the Lonsdale Cup.

The 2008 Ebor Festival was abandoned after wet weather left the course waterlogged and unfit for racing. It was the first time in the event's history that the entire card had to be scrapped due to bad weather.

As one of the last major race meetings of the flat season, it attracts racegoers from all over the UK and overseas.
