= Sceptre Stakes =

Flat horse race in Britain

- Class: Group 3
- Location: Doncaster Racecourse; Doncaster, England
- Race type: Flat / Thoroughbred
- Sponsor: Japan Racing Association
- Website: Doncaster

Race information
- Distance: 7f 6y (1,414 metres)
- Surface: Turf
- Track: Straight
- Qualification: Three-years-old and up fillies and mares
- Weight: 9 st 0 lb (3yo); 9 st 4 lb (4yo+); Penalties; 7 lb for Group 1 winners * 5 lb for Group 2 winners * 3 lb for Group 3 winners * * after 31 March
- Purse: £85,000 (2025); 1st: £48,204

Sceptre Stakes
2026
Pina Sonata	Touleen	The Prettiest Star

Previous years
2025
Fair Angellica	Bright Thunder	Spiritual
2024
Great Generation	Elim	Queen Of Mougins
2023
Matilda Picotte	Nigiri	Vetiver
2022
Bounce The Blues	Umm Kulthum	Romantic Rival
2021
Just Beautiful	Double Or Bubble	Loch Lein

2020-2011
2020
Foxtrot Lady	Althiqa	Bounce The Blues
2019
Breathtaking Look	Preening	Mot Juste
2018
Dancing Star	Eirene	All Out
2017
Music Box	Eternally	Tomyris
2016
Spangled	Mise En Rose	Lumiere
2015
Realtra	Pelerin	Terror
2014
Kiyoshi	Bragging	Al Thakhira
2013
Nargys	Switcher	Winning Express
2012
Sunday Times	Gamilati	Valencha
2011
Alanza	Dever Dream	Chachamaidee

2010-2001
2010
Dever Dream	Mosqueras Romance	Blue Angel
2009
Fantasia	Shamwari Lodge	Say No Now
2008
Royal Confidence	Chantilly Tiffany	Festoso
2007
Medley	Our Faye	Passion Fruit
2006
Silver Touch	Wake Up Maggie	Highway To Glory
2005
Favourable Terms	Nufoos	Attune
2004
Attune	Gonfilia	Ithaca
2003
Tantina	Chic	Play That Tune
2002
Mamounia	Hideaway Heroine	Starfan
2001
Nice One Clare	Softly Tread	Alshadiyah

2000-1991
2000
Kalindi	Veil Of Avalon	Last Resort
1999
Susu	Pescara	Capistrano Day
1998
Ashraakat	Risque Lady	Supercal
1997
Aunty Jane	Dazzle	Miss Riviera
1996
My Branch	High Summer	Dance Sequence
1995
Branston Abby	Lovely Millie	Didina
1994
Hill Hopper	Elrafa Ah	Queenbird
1993
Arjuzah	Moon Over Miami	Taufan Blu
1992
Perfect Circle	Midnight Air	Badawi
1991
You Know The Rules	Silver Braid	Souk

1990-1988
1990
Tabdea	Line Of Thunder	Grand Blush
1988
Jamarj	Ohsomellow	Jungle Jezebel

The Sceptre Stakes is a Group 3 flat horse race in Great Britain open to fillies and mares aged three years or older. It is run at Doncaster over a distance of 7 furlongs and 6 yards (1,414 metres), and it is scheduled to take place each year in September.

== History ==
The event is named after Sceptre, a successful filly foaled in 1899. Her victories included four Classics, concluding with Doncaster's St Leger Stakes.

The Sceptre Stakes used to be contested over 1 mile, and for a period it held Listed status. It was cut to 7 furlongs in 1993, and promoted to Group 3 level in 2011.

The race is now staged on the opening day of Doncaster's four-day St. Leger Festival.

== Records ==
Most successful horse:

- no horse has won this race more than once

Leading jockey (4 wins):

- Michael Hills – My Branch (1996), Mamounia (2002), Tantina (2003), Royal Confidence (2008)

Leading trainer (5 wins):

- Barry Hills – Asteroid Field (1986), My Branch (1996), Mamounia (2002), Tantina (2003), Royal Confidence (2008)

== Winners ==
Year	Winner	Age	Jockey	Trainer	Time
1982	Triple Tipple	3	Greville Starkey	Luca Cumani	1:37.64
1983	Royal Heroine	3	Walter Swinburn	Michael Stoute	1:42.89
1984	Capricorn Belle	3	Rae Guest	Luca Cumani	1:39.59
1985	Cherry Ridge	3	Willie Carson	Geoff Wragg	1:40.15
1986	Asteroid Field	3	Brent Thomson	Barry Hills	1:35.67
1987	Tahilla	3	Pat Eddery	Jeremy Tree	1:39.27
1988	Jamarj	3	Michael Roberts	Peter Easterby	1:38.96
1989	Abandoned due to subsidence
1990	Tabdea	3	Willie Carson	Alex Scott	1:36.78
1991	You Know the Rules	4	Lester Piggott	Mick Channon	1:39.27
1992	Perfect Circle	3	Willie Carson	Michael Stoute	1:39.03
1993	Arjuzah	3	Willie Carson	John Gosden	1:27.46
1994	Hill Hopper	3	Frankie Dettori	John Gosden	1:26.72
1995	Branston Abby	6	Michael Roberts	Mark Johnston	1:25.52
1996	My Branch	3	Michael Hills	Barry Hills	1:24.01
1997	Aunty Jane	4	Pat Eddery	John Dunlop	1:24.66
1998	Ashraakat	3	Pat Eddery	John Dunlop	1:26.69
1999	Susu	6	John Reid	Sir Michael Stoute	1:25.89
2000	Kalindi	3	Tony Culhane	Mick Channon	1:26.28
2001	Nice One Clare	5	Johnny Murtagh	Pip Payne	1:26.32
2002	Mamounia	3	Michael Hills	Barry Hills	1:24.52
2003	Tantina	3	Michael Hills	Barry Hills	1:27.15
2004	Attune	3	Kevin Darley	Brian Meehan	1:22.26
2005	Favourable Terms	5	Kieren Fallon	Sir Michael Stoute	1:24.51
2006 (Note: The 2006 running took place at York)	Silver Touch	3	Ryan Moore	Mick Channon	1:24.09
2007	Medley	3	Ryan Moore	Richard Hannon Sr.	1:24.82
2008	Royal Confidence	3	Michael Hills	Barry Hills	1:28.66
2009	Fantasia	3	Kieren Fallon	Luca Cumani	1:22.69
2010	Dever Dream	3	Eddie Ahern	William Haggas	1:24.07
2011	Alanza	3	Johnny Murtagh	John Oxx	1:25.53
2012	Sunday Times	3	Jamie Spencer	Peter Chapple-Hyam	1:25.37
2013	Nargys	3	Andrea Atzeni	Luca Cumani	1:26.30
2014	Kiyoshi	3	Jamie Spencer	Charles Hills	1:22.74
2015	Realtra	3	Jack Mitchell	Roger Varian	1:22.86
2016	Spangled	4	Andrea Atzeni	Roger Varian	1:25.81
2017	Music Box	3	Ryan Moore	Aidan O'Brien	1:24.72
2018	Dancing Star	5	Oisin Murphy	Andrew Balding	1:25.26
2019	Breathtaking Look	4	Jim Crowley	Stuart Williams	1:23.40
2020	Foxtrot Lady	5	Frankie Dettori	Andrew Balding	1:24.47
2021	Just Beautiful	3	Silvestre De Sousa	Ivan Furtado	1:22.75
2022	Bounce The Blues	5	William Buick	Andrew Balding	1:24.57
2023	Matilda Picotte	3	Oisin Murphy	Kieran Cotter	1:23.48
2024	Great Generation	3	Marco Ghiani	Marco Botti	1:25.22
2025	Fair Angellica	4	Finley Marsh	Richard Hughes	1:24.63

== See also ==
- Horse racing in Great Britain
- List of British flat horse races
