= Gallinule Stakes =

Flat horse race in Ireland

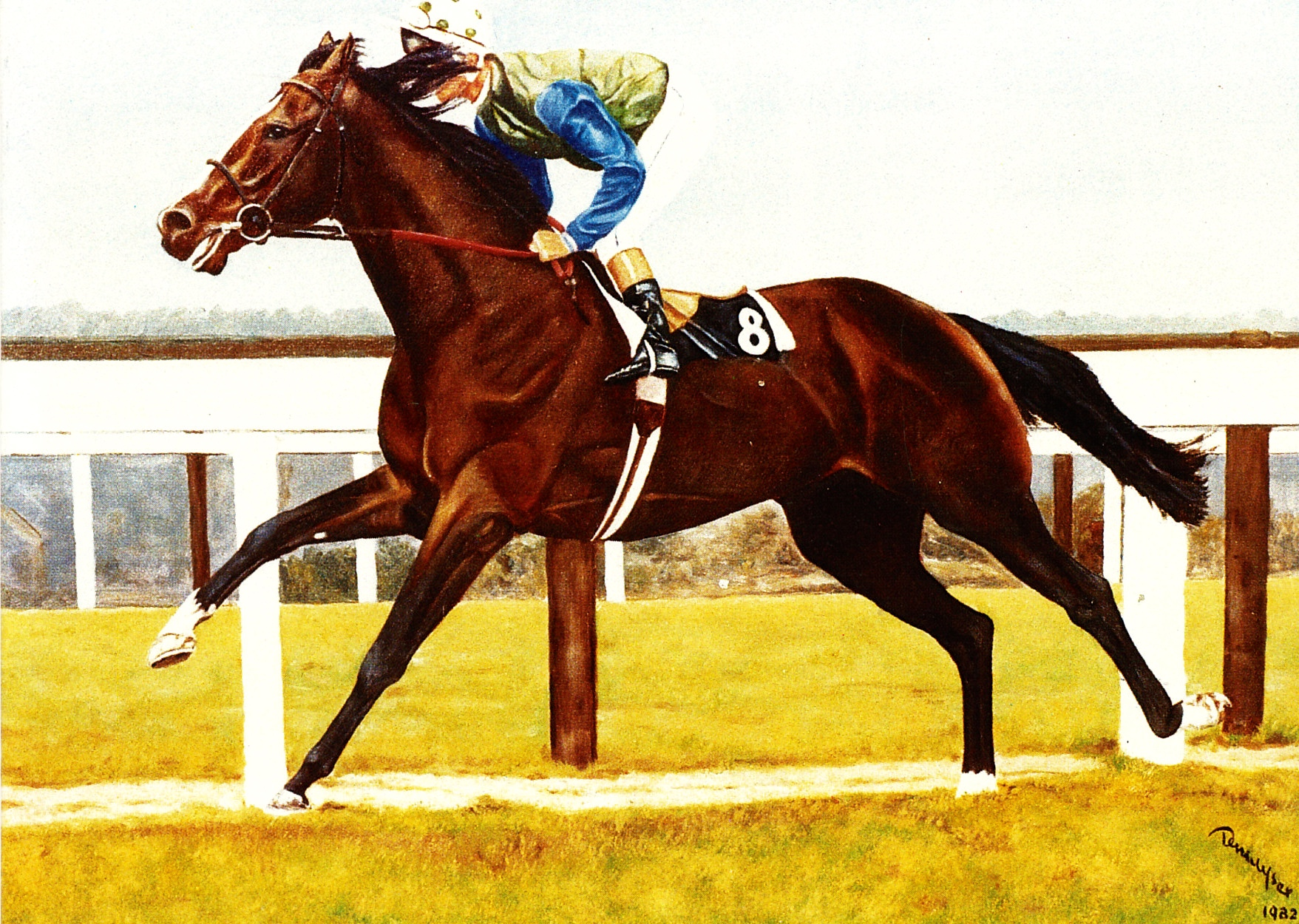
- Assert, oil on canvas Painting by Bob Demuyser (1920-2003)
- Class: Group 3
- Location: Curragh Racecourse; County Kildare, Ireland
- Race type: Flat / Thoroughbred
- Sponsor: Heider family
- Website: Curragh

Race information
- Distance: 1m 2f (2,012 metres)
- Surface: Turf
- Track: Right-handed
- Qualification: Three-year-olds
- Weight: 9 st 5 lb Allowances; 3 lb for fillies Penalties; 7 lb for Group 1 winners* 5 lb for Group 2 winners* 5 lb if two Group 3 wins* 3 lb if one Group 3 win* *after 1 June 2020
- Purse: €50,000 (2021); 1st: €29,500

Gallinule Stakes
2026
Causeway	Zia Zabel	Shaihaan

Previous years
2025
Thrice	Emit	Reyenzi
2024
Chief Little Rock	Stromberg	Ecureuil Secret
2023
Drumroll	Teutates	Kingswood
2022
Hannibal Barca	Lyrical Poetry	Boundless Ocean
2021
Earlswood	Arturo Toscanini	Snapraeterea

2020-2011
2020
Crossfirehurricane	Gold Maze	Sherpa
2019
Constantinople	Buckhurst	U S S Michigan
2018
Platinum Warrior	Latrobe	Harvestfortheworld
2017
Homesman	Born To Play	Finn McCool
2016
Beacon Rock	Santa Monica	Foxtrot Charlie
2015
Curvy	Giovanni Canaletto	Prince Gagarin
2014
Adelaide	Mekong River	Boqa
2013
Leading Light	Little White Cloud	Count Of Limonade
2012
Speaking Of Which	Soon	Athens
2011
Alexander Pope	Moriarty	Smartcity

2010-2001
2010
Jan Vermeer	Bobbyscot	Shintoh
2009
Grand Ducal	Alaivan	The Bull Hayes
2008
Hebridean	Lisvale	Central Station
2007
Alexander Of Hales	Spanish Harlem	Eyshal
2006
Puerto Rico	Mon Michel	King In Waiting
2005
Im Spartacus	Scorpion	Mister Genepi
2004
Meath	Cairdeas	Barati
2003
Nysaean	Handel	Tipperary All Star
2002
Della Francesca	Jammaal	Sadlers Wings
2001
Exaltation	Jammaal	Pebble Island

2000-1991
2000
Glyndebourne	Right Wing	Media Puzzle
1999
Urban Ocean	Sunshine Street	Dazzling Park
1998
Quws	Takarian	Risk Material
1997
Johan Cruyff	Olympic Majesty	Mingling Glances
1996
Needle Gun	Prince Of Andros	Al Mohaajir
1995
Shemaran	Prince Of Andros	Akhiyar
1994
Right Win	George Augustus	Artema
1993
Massyar	Hushang	Sinissipi
1992
Brief Truce	Firing Line	Nordic Brief
1991
Sportsworld	Runyon	Blue Daisy

1990-1988
1990
Missionary Ridge	Lotus Pool	Anvari
1989
Porter Rhodes	Phantom Breeze	Petite Ile
1988
Project Manager	Baltic Fox	Kris Kringle

The Gallinule Stakes is a Group 3 flat horse race in Ireland open to three-year-old thoroughbreds. It is run at the Curragh over a distance of 1 mile and 2 furlongs (2,012 metres), and it is scheduled to take place each year in May.

== History ==
The event is named after Gallinule, the Irish-based sire of Pretty Polly. It was originally restricted to three-year-olds, and for a period it held Group 2 status. It was extended to 1 mile and 4 furlongs in 1976, and reverted to its previous length in 1983.

The race was opened to older horses in 1994. It was downgraded to Group 3 level in 1998. It was staged at Leopardstown in 2001 and 2002, and its former age restriction was restored in 2004.

== Records ==
Leading jockey since 1950 (8 wins):

- Lester Piggott – Hail the Pirates (1973), Meneval (1976), Alleged (1977), Inkerman (1978), Gonzales (1980), Lord Duke (1985), Sportsworld (1991), Right Win (1994)

Leading trainer since 1950 (20 wins):

- Aidan O'Brien - Johan Cruyff (1997), Urban Ocean (1999), Glyndebourne (2000), Della Francesca (2002), Meath (2004), Puerto Rico (2006), Alexander of Hales (2007), Hebridean (2008), Grand Ducal (2009), Jan Vermeer (2010), Alexander Pope (2011), Leading Light (2013), Adelaide (2014), Beacon Rock (2016), Homesman (2017), Constantinople (2019), Drumroll (2023), Chief Little Rock (2024), Thrice (2025), Causeway (2026)

== Winners since 1977 ==
Year	Winner	Age	Jockey	Trainer	Time
1977	Alleged	3	Lester Piggott	Vincent O'Brien	2:30.90
1978	Inkerman	3	Lester Piggott	Vincent O'Brien	2:32.20
1979	Ardross	3	Stan Moore	Paddy Prendergast	2:52.60
1980	Gonzales	3	Lester Piggott	Vincent O'Brien	2:33.10
1981	Erins Isle	3	Declan Gillespie	Jim Bolger	2:51.20
1982	Assert	3	Christy Roche	David O'Brien	2:34.70
1983	Carlingford Castle	3	Michael Kinane	Liam Browne	2:57.50
1984	Montelimar	3	Pat Eddery	Vincent O'Brien	2:09.20
1985	Lord Duke	3	Lester Piggott	Frank Dunne
1986	Welsh Fantasy	3	Pat Shanahan	Con Collins	2:16.20
1987	Seattle Dancer	3	Cash Asmussen	Vincent O'Brien	2:09.20
1988	Project Manager	3	Kevin Manning	Jim Bolger	2:07.10
1989	Porter Rhodes	3	Paul Eddery	Henry Cecil	2:07.50
1990	Missionary Ridge	3	Michael Hills	Barry Hills	2:04.20
1991	Sportsworld	3	Lester Piggott	Vincent O'Brien	2:06.60
1992	Brief Truce	3	Michael Kinane	Dermot Weld	2:09.00
1993	Massyar	3	Michael Kinane	John Oxx	2:11.10
1994	Right Win	4	Lester Piggott	Richard Hannon Sr.	2:19.90
1995	Shemaran	3	Johnny Murtagh	John Oxx	2:12.80
1996	Needle Gun	6	Michael Roberts	Clive Brittain	2:06.00
1997	Johan Cruyff	3	Kevin Manning	Aidan O'Brien	2:11.90
1998	Quws	4	Stephen Craine	Kevin Prendergast	2:07.70
1999	Urban Ocean	3	Seamie Heffernan	Aidan O'Brien	2:14.40
2000	Glyndebourne	3	Seamie Heffernan	Aidan O'Brien	2:12.20
2001	Exaltation	3	Johnny Murtagh	John Oxx	2:11.00
2002	Della Francesca	3	Michael Kinane	Aidan O'Brien	2:12.50
2003	Nysaean	4	Jimmy Fortune	Richard Hannon Sr.	2:10.30
2004	Meath	3	Jamie Spencer	Aidan O'Brien	2:10.90
2005	Im Spartacus	3	Jamie Spencer	David Flood	2:12.70
2006	Puerto Rico	3	Kieren Fallon	Aidan O'Brien	2:20.20
2007	Alexander of Hales	3	Seamie Heffernan	Aidan O'Brien	2:09.60
2008	Hebridean	3	Johnny Murtagh	Aidan O'Brien	2:12.05
2009	Grand Ducal	3	Johnny Murtagh	Aidan O'Brien	2:19.71
2010	Jan Vermeer	3	Johnny Murtagh	Aidan O'Brien	2:11.38
2011	Alexander Pope (Note: The 2011 winner Alexander Pope was later exported to Hong Kong and renamed Packing Tycoon)	3	Colm O'Donoghue	Aidan O'Brien	2:08.46
2012	Speaking of Which	3	Pat Smullen	Dermot Weld	2:09.80
2013	Leading Light	3	Joseph O'Brien	Aidan O'Brien	2:07.83
2014	Adelaide	3	Joseph O'Brien	Aidan O'Brien	2:16.79
2015	Curvy	3	Wayne Lordan	David Wachman	2:08.93
2016	Beacon Rock	3	Ryan Moore	Aidan O'Brien	2:17.12
2017	Homesman	3	Ryan Moore	Aidan O'Brien	2:12.63
2018	Platinum Warrior	3	Shane Foley	Michael Halford	2:09.84
2019	Constantinople	3	Ryan Moore	Aidan O'Brien	2:10.23
2020	Crossfirehurricane (Note: The 2020 race was run in June due to the COVID-19 pandemic in the Republic of Ireland)	3	Shane Crosse	Joseph O'Brien	2:08.41
2021	Earlswood	3	Ben Coen	Johnny Murtagh	2:16.38
2022	Hannibal Barca	3	Shane Crosse	Joseph O'Brien	2:09.94
2023	Drumroll	3	Ryan Moore	Aidan O'Brien	2:09.07
2024	Chief Little Rock	3	Wayne Lordan	Aidan O'Brien	2:08.23
2025	Thrice (Note: The winner was originally place second behind Reyenzi, however following a stewards enquiry was promoted to first)	3	Wayne Lordan	Aidan O'Brien	2:04.46
2026	Causeway	3	Ryan Moore	Aidan O'Brien	2:02.22

== Earlier winners ==
- 1950: Dark Warrior
- 1951: Chadwick Manor
- 1952: Windy Torrent
- 1953: Chamier
- 1954: Hidalgo
- 1955: Arctic Time
- 1956: No Comment
- 1957: After the Show
- 1958: Tharp
- 1959: Anthony
- 1960: Chamour
- 1961: Royal Avenue
- 1962: Saint Denys
- 1963: Vic Mo Chroi
- 1964: Master Buck
- 1965: Baljour
- 1966: Busted
- 1967: Atherstone Wood
- 1968: Giolla Mear
- 1969: Onondaga
- 1970: Saracen Sword
- 1971: Grenfall
- 1972: Bog Road
- 1973: Hail the Pirates
- 1974: Sir Penfro
- 1975: King Pellinore
- 1976: Meneval

== See also ==
- Horse racing in Ireland
- List of Irish flat horse races
