= Adelaide (horse) =

Irish-bred Thoroughbred racehorse

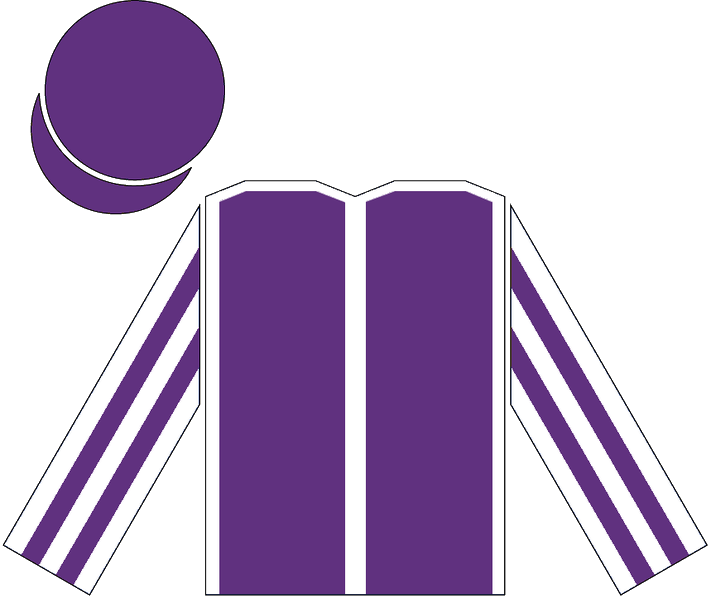
- Racing silks of Derrick Smith
- Sire: Galileo
- Grandsire: Sadler's Wells
- Dam: Elletelle
- Damsire: Elnadim
- Sex: Colt
- Foaled: 19 February 2011
- Country: Ireland
- Colour: Bay
- Breeder: Elletelle Syndicate
- Owner: Derrick Smith, Mrs John Magnier, Michael Tabor B & M Webb, J & C Murray, J, F Ingham, T & S Magnier
- Trainer: Aidan O'Brien
- Record: 8: 4-3-1
- Earnings: £1,432,325

Major wins
- Gallinule Stakes (2014); Secretariat Stakes (2014); W S Cox Plate (2014)

Adelaide foaled 19 February 2011 is an Irish thoroughbred racehorse. A winner of both races (including the Gallinule Stakes) in his native country he is better known for his performances in international competition. In 2014 he raced in the United Kingdom, France, the United States and Australia, recording major wins in the Secretariat Stakes and the Cox Plate.

== Background ==
Adelaide is a bay horse with a white star and three white socks bred in Ireland by the Elletelle Syndicate. He was sired by champion sire Galileo out of the mare Elletelle winner of the 2007 Queen Mary Stakes. He is owned by a partnership of Derrick Smith, Susan Magnier and Michael Tabor. He is trained by Aidan O'Brien.

== Racing career ==
=== 2013: two-year-old season ===
Adelaide's only start as a two-year-old was in a maiden race over one mile at Leopardstown Racecourse on 26 October in which he started the 9/2 second favourite behind his stable companion Gypsy King. Ridden by Michael Hussey, he took the lead inside the final furlong and won by two and a half lengths from the Jim Bolger-trained Fiscal Focus, with Gypsy King in third.

=== 2014: three-year-old season ===
On his three-year-old debut Adelaide travelled to France for the Prix Hocquart at Longchamp. He finished half a length behind Free Port Lux but beat eventual Grand Prix de Paris winner Gallante into third place. He returned to Ireland to win the Group 3 Gallinule Stakes being ridden by regular Ballydole Jockey Joseph O'Brien for the first time. A month later Adelaide started the favourite for the King Edward VII Stakes at Royal Ascot but finished second place behind Eagle Top.

In July he travelled to Belmont Park to contest the first running of the Belmont Derby along with UAE Derby winner Toast of New York. Ridden by Colm O'Donoghue, he took the lead in the straight but was overtaken inside the final furlong and was beaten a neck by the 23.5/1 outsider Mr Speaker. Following this performance he was entered into the Grade I Secretariat Stakes and returned to the United States to contest the race at Arlington Racetrack on 16 August. He started favourite and after sitting behind the front runner Tourist jockey Ryan Moore picked him up in the closing stages and he went on to win by one and a half lengths from Tourist.

On his return to Europe, Adelaide started 5/1 fourth favourite for the Prix Niel (a trial race for the Prix de l'Arc de Triomphe) over 2400 metres at Longchamp. Ridden by Moore he struggled to obtain a clear run in the straight before finishing strongly and appeared unlucky in finishing only third behind Ectot and Teletext. The colt bypassed the Arc and was sent to Melbourne to contest Australia's premier weight-for-age race, the Cox Plate over 2040 metres at Moonee Valley Racecourse on 25 October. Ridden again by Moore, he started 7/1 third favourite, having been drawn on the outside of the field. Moore dropped the horse to last place in the early stages before making steady progress and moving up on the outside to dispute the lead on the final turn. He gained the advantage inside the final furlong and won by a short neck from the favourite Fawkner with the New Zealand mare Silent Achiever a short head away in third. He became the first horse trained outside Australia and New Zealand to win the Plate. After the race Moore said "We had several plans and we didn't really do any of them. He jumped slowly and I went back to any plan I could think of. They went so fast to the bend the first time I could not get where I wanted to be. When they started to slow going down the hill, I had to get closer. I was going around them and I was able to make my ground smoothly and keep a fairly constant speed".

== Stud Record ==
Adelaide stands as a sire at Coolmore Stud in Australia.

=== Notable progeny ===
c = colt, f = filly, g = gelding

Foaled	Name	Sex	Major wins
2016	Funstar	f	Flight Stakes

== Pedigree ==
Pedigree of Adelaide (IRE), bay colt, 2011
Sire Galileo (IRE) 1998	Sadler's Wells (USA); 1981	Northern Dancer	Nearctic
Sire Galileo (IRE) 1998	Sadler's Wells (USA); 1981	Northern Dancer	Natalma
Sire Galileo (IRE) 1998	Sadler's Wells (USA); 1981	Fairy Bridge	Bold Reason
Sire Galileo (IRE) 1998	Sadler's Wells (USA); 1981	Fairy Bridge	Special
Sire Galileo (IRE) 1998	Urban Sea (USA) ch. 1989	Miswaki	Mr. Prospector
Sire Galileo (IRE) 1998	Urban Sea (USA) ch. 1989	Miswaki	Hopespringseternal
Sire Galileo (IRE) 1998	Urban Sea (USA) ch. 1989	Allegretta	Lombard
Sire Galileo (IRE) 1998	Urban Sea (USA) ch. 1989	Allegretta	Anatevka
Dam Elletelle (IRE) 2005	Elnadim (USA); 1994	Danzig	Northern Dancer
Dam Elletelle (IRE) 2005	Elnadim (USA); 1994	Danzig	Pas de Nom
Dam Elletelle (IRE) 2005	Elnadim (USA); 1994	Elle Seule	Exclusive Native
Dam Elletelle (IRE) 2005	Elnadim (USA); 1994	Elle Seule	Fall Aspen
Dam Elletelle (IRE) 2005	Flamanda (GB); 1993	Niniski	Nijinsky
Dam Elletelle (IRE) 2005	Flamanda (GB); 1993	Niniski	Virginia Hills
Dam Elletelle (IRE) 2005	Flamanda (GB); 1993	Nemesia	Mill Reef
Dam Elletelle (IRE) 2005	Flamanda (GB); 1993	Nemesia	Elegant Tern (Family 4-r)

- Adelaide is inbred 3 x 4 to Northern Dancer, meaning that this stallion appears in both the third and fourth generations of his pedigree.
