= Dahlia Stakes =

Flat horse race in Britain

- Class: Group 2
- Location: Rowley Mile; Newmarket, England
- Inaugurated: 1997
- Race type: Flat / Thoroughbred
- Sponsor: Betfred
- Website: Newmarket

Race information
- Distance: 1m 1f (1,811 metres)
- Surface: Turf
- Track: Straight
- Qualification: Four-years-old and up fillies and mares
- Weight: 9 st 2 lb Penalties; 5 lb for Group 1 winners * 3 lb for Group 2 winners * * since 31 August last year
- Purse: £125,000 (2025); 1st: £70,888

Dahlia Stakes
2026
Jancis	Cathedral	Survie

Previous years
2025
Cinderella's Dream	Elmalka	Beautiful Love
2024
Stay Alert	Running Lion	Caernarfon
2023
Via Sistina	Al Husn	Astral Beau
2022
Dreamloper	Ville De Grace	Ebaiyra
2021
Lady Bowthorpe	Queen Power	Lavender's Blue

2020-2011
2020
Terebellum	Queen Power	Magic Lily
2019
Worth Waiting	Nyaleti	Billesdon Brook
2018
Wuheida	Wilamina	Indian Blessing
2017
Somehow	Elbereth	Aim To Please
2016
Usherette	Arabian Queen	Amazing Maria
2015
Bragging	Kleo	Belle D'or
2014
Esoterique	Integral	Gifted Girl
2013
Dank	Chigun	Thistle Bird
2012
Izzi Top	Captivator	Primevere
2011
I'm A Dreamer	Sea of Heartbreak	Chachamaidee

2010-2001
2010
Strawberrydaiquiri	Honimiere	Spacious
2009
Heaven Sent	Casilda	Barshiba
2008
Heaven Sent	Harvest Queen	Barshiba
2007
Echelon	Topatoo	Dont Dili Dali
2006
Violet Park	Royal Alchemist	Mango Mischief
2005
Tarfah	Summitville	La Persiana
2004
Beneventa	Silence Is Golden	Special Delivery
2003
Aldora	Lady Bear	Golden Silca
2002
Tarfshi	Spring Oak	Premier Prize
2001
Cayman Sunset	Katy Nowaitee	Flossy

2000-1997
2000
Cape Grace	Annapurna	Diamond White
1999
Putuna	Maria Isabella	Keld
1998
Yabint El Sultan	Supercal	Star Precision
1997
Balalaika	Tsarnista	Medieval Lady

The Dahlia Stakes is a Group 2 flat horse race in Great Britain open to fillies and mares aged four years or older. It is run over a distance of 1 mile and 1 furlong (1,811 metres) on the Rowley Mile at Newmarket in late April or early May.

== History ==
The event is named after Dahlia, a successful filly in the 1970s. It was established in 1997, and initially held Listed status. It was promoted to Group 3 level in 2004 and upgraded to Group 2 level in 2015.

The Dahlia Stakes is currently staged on the third day of the three-day Guineas Festival meeting. It is run on the same day as the 1000 Guineas.

== Records ==
Most successful horse (2 wins):

- Heaven Sent – 2008, 2009

Leading jockey (6 wins):

- Ryan Moore – Heaven Sent (2008, 2009), Strawberrydaiquiri (2010), Dank (2013), Bragging (2015), Somehow (2017)

Leading trainer (6 wins):

- Sir Michael Stoute – Echelon (2007), Heaven Sent (2008, 2009), Strawberrydaiquiri (2010), Dank (2013), Bragging (2015)

Leading owner (4 wins):

- Godolphin - Usherette (2016), Wuheida (2018), Terebellum (2020), Cinderella's Dream (2025)

== Winners ==
Year	Winner	Age	Jockey	Trainer	Owner	Time
1997	Balalaika	4	Frankie Dettori	Luca Cumani	Helena Springfield Ltd	1:51.81
1998	Yabint El Sultan	4	Ray Cochrane	Bryan McMahon	G S D Imports Ltd	1:56.46
1999 (Note: The 1999 edition was run on Newmarket's July Course over 1 mile and 110 yards)	Putuna	4	Kieren Fallon	Ian Balding	Robert Hitchins	1:46.10
2000	Cape Grace	4	Dane O'Neill	Richard Hannon Sr.	George W. Strawbridge Jr.	1:53.29
2001	Cayman Sunset	4	Jimmy Fortune	Ed Dunlop	M P Burke	1:53.28
2002	Tarfshi	4	Philip Robinson	Michael Jarvis	Ahmed Al Maktoum	1:51.49
2003	Aldora	4	Martin Dwyer	Mick Ryan	Aldora Partnership	1:53.81
2004	Beneventa	4	Seb Sanders	John Dunlop	R N Khan	1:50.65
2005	Tarfah	4	Seb Sanders	Gerard Butler	Abdulla Al Khalifa	1:48.78
2006	Violet Park	5	Richard Hughes	Brian Meehan	Mrs J Cash	1:54.24
2007	Echelon	5	Kerrin McEvoy	Sir Michael Stoute	Cheveley Park Stud	1:49.98
2008	Heaven Sent	5	Ryan Moore	Sir Michael Stoute	Cheveley Park Stud	1:55.00
2009	Heaven Sent	6	Ryan Moore	Sir Michael Stoute	Cheveley Park Stud	1:47.98
2010	Strawberrydaiquiri	4	Ryan Moore	Sir Michael Stoute	Renata Jacobs	1:54.03
2011	I'm a Dreamer	4	William Buick	David Simcock	St Albans Bloodstock	1:52.78
2012	Izzi Top	4	William Buick	John Gosden	Helena Springfield Ltd	1:56.38
2013	Dank	4	Ryan Moore	Sir Michael Stoute	James Wigan	1:49.69
2014	Esoterique	4	Maxime Guyon	André Fabre	Édouard de Rothschild	1:50.41
2015	Bragging	4	Ryan Moore	Sir Michael Stoute	Khalid Abdullah	1:48.33
2016	Usherette	4	Mickael Barzalona	André Fabre	Godolphin	1:51.06
2017	Somehow	4	Ryan Moore	Aidan O'Brien	Tabor / Smith / Magnier	1:49.19
2018	Wuheida	4	William Buick	Charlie Appleby	Godolphin	1:50.43
2019	Worth Waiting	4	James Doyle	David Lanigan	Saif Ali	1:51.27
2020 (Note: The 2020 race was run over ten furlongs in June, due to the COVID-19 pandemic in the United Kingdom)	Terebellum	4	Frankie Dettori	John Gosden	Godolphin	2:03.28
2021	Lady Bowthorpe	5	Kieran Shoemark	William Jarvis	Emma Banks	1:51.98
2022	Dreamloper	5	Kieran Shoemark	Ed Walker	J Fill	1:49.74
2023	Via Sistina	5	Jamie Spencer	George Boughey	Mrs R G Hillen	1:51.49
2024	Stay Alert	5	David Egan	Hughie Morrison	Ben & Sir Martyn Arbib	1:50.23
2025	Cinderella's Dream	4	William Buick	Charlie Appleby	Godolphin	1:50.29
2026	Jancis	5	Sean Levey	Willie McCreery	Arturo Cousino	1:47.41

== See also ==
- Horse racing in Great Britain
- List of British flat horse races
