= Blandford Stakes =

Horse race in Ireland

- Class: Group 2
- Location: Curragh Racecourse; County Kildare, Ireland
- Race type: Flat / Thoroughbred
- Sponsor: Moyglare Stud
- Website: Curragh

Race information
- Distance: 1m 2f (2,012 metres)
- Surface: Turf
- Track: Right-handed
- Qualification: Three-years-old and up fillies and mares
- Weight: 9 st 0 lb (3yo); 9 st 5 lb (4yo+); Penalties; 3 lb for Group 1 winners * * since 1 January
- Purse: €188,000 (2022); 1st: €118,000

Blandford Stakes
2026
Thundering On	Lilt	Red Letter

Previous years
2025
Barnavara	One Look	Red Letter
2024
Hanalia	Wingspan	Purple Lily
2023
Lumiere Rock	Jackie Oh	Trevaunance
2022
Above The Curve	Insinuendo	Galleria Borghese
2021
La Petite Coco	Love	Thundering Nights

2020-2011
2020
Cayenne Pepper	Amma Grace	Thundering Nights
2019
Tarnawa	Goddess	Credenza
2018
Eziyra	Who's Steph	I'm So Fancy
2017
Shamreen	Beautiful Morning	Rain Goddess
2016
Shamreen	Best In The World	Santa Monica
2015
Ribbons	Tapestry	Bocca Baciata
2014
Tarfasha	Chicquita	Roheryn
2013
Belle de Crecy	Hot Snap	Magical Dream
2012
Up	Caponata	Nahrain
2011
Manieree	Sapphire	Look At Me

2010-2001
2010
Eleanora Duse	She's Our Mark	Choose Me
2009
Chinese White	Roman Empress	She's Our Mark
2008
Katiyra	Beach Bunny	Love To Dance
2007
Four Sins	Queen's Best	Dalvina
2006
Red Bloom	Sina Cova	Paris Winds
2005
Red Bloom	Pictavia	Kinnaird
2004
Monturani	Kinnaird	All Too Beautiful
2003
Chorist	Place Rouge	Dossier
2002
Irresistible Jewel	Chorist	Miss Honorine
2001
Dearly	Affianced	Tarfshi

2000-1991
2000
Chiang Mai	Chimes At Midnight	Happy Change
1999
Insatiable	Theatreworld	Lisieux Rose
1998
Lisieux Rose	Golden Rule	Largesse
1997
Quws	Spirit Of Tara	Vivo
1996
Predappio	Sanoosea	Mohaajir
1995
Humbel	Ballykett Nancy	Idris
1994
Royal Ballerina	Alriffa	Karikata
1993
Foresee	Portrait Gallery	Balawhar
1992
Andros Bay	Arrikala	Ebaziya
1991
Topanoora	Zafadola	Favoured Nations

1990-1988
1990
Sesame	Topanoora	Mr Pintips
1989
Indian Queen	Tursanah	Tyrone Bridge
1988
Kris Kringle	Almaarad	Eurobird

The Blandford Stakes is a Group 2 flat horse race in Ireland open to thoroughbred fillies and mares aged three years or older. It is run at the Curragh over a distance of 1 mile and 2 furlongs (2,012 metres), and it is scheduled to take place each year in September.

== History ==
The event is named after Blandford, a successful sire in the 1930s. It was formerly open to horses of either gender, and used to be contested over 1 mile and 4 furlongs.

The race was held in mid-October during the late 1980s and early 1990s. Its distance was shortened by a furlong in 1994. It was relegated from Group 2 to Group 3 level in 1999, and from this point it took place in mid-September.

The Blandford Stakes was cut to its present length and restricted to fillies and mares in 2001. It regained Group 2 status in 2004. It is currently part of the Irish Champions Weekend meeting.

== Records ==
Most successful horse since 1947 (2 wins):

- Nemain – 1985, 1986
- Red Bloom – 2005, 2006
- Shamreen - 2016, 2017

Leading jockey since 1950 (5 wins):

- Liam Ward – Beau Sire (1950), Do Well (1951), Jongleur (1956), Wenona (1968), Riboprince (1970)
- Michael Kinane – Humbel (1995), Insatiable (1999), Chiang Mai (2000), Four Sins (2007), Katiyra (2008)
- Pat Smullen - Irrestible Jewel (2002), Chinese White (2009), Tarfasha (2014), Shamreen (2016, 2017)

Leading trainer since 1950 (15 wins):

- Vincent O'Brien – Little Mo (1959), Silver Moon (1961), Donato (1965), Wenona (1968), Riboprince (1970), Wenceslas (1971), Manitoulin (1972), Richard Grenville (1974), King Pellinore (1975), Gonzales (1980), Magesterial (1981), Lords (1982), South Atlantic (1983), Kris Kringle (1988), Andros Bay (1992)

== Winners since 1980 ==
Year	Winner	Age	Jockey	Trainer	Time
1980	Gonzales	3	Tommy Murphy	Vincent O'Brien	2:40.30
1981	Magesterial	4	Pat Eddery	Vincent O'Brien	2:34.50
1982	Lords	3	Pat Eddery	Vincent O'Brien	2:32.00
1983	South Atlantic	3	Pat Eddery	Vincent O'Brien	2:31.30
1984	Arctic Lord	4	Christy Roche	David O'Brien	2:38.40
1985	Nemain	3	Christy Roche	David O'Brien	2:42.80
1986	Nemain	4	Christy Roche	David O'Brien	2:41.30
1987	Eurobird	3	Cash Asmussen	John Oxx	2:46.90
1988	Kris Kringle	3	John Reid	Vincent O'Brien	2:45.60
1989	Indian Queen	4	Declan Gillespie	William Hastings-Bass	2:40.70
1990	Sesame	5	Gary Hind	David Morley	2:37.30
1991	Topanoora	4	Christy Roche	Jim Bolger	2:41.40
1992	Andros Bay	3	Lester Piggott	Vincent O'Brien	2:37.50
1993	Foresee	3	Johnny Murtagh	John Oxx	2:45.70
1994	Royal Ballerina	4	Warren O'Connor	Michael Kauntze	2:25.50
1995	Humbel	3	Michael Kinane	Dermot Weld	2:25.60
1996	Predappio	3	Pat Shanahan	John Oxx	2:30.30
1997	Quws	3	Stephen Craine	Kevin Prendergast	2:32.90
1998	Lisieux Rose	3	Pat Shanahan	Dermot Weld	2:31.90
1999	Insatiable	6	Michael Kinane	Sir Michael Stoute	2:31.50
2000	Chiang Mai	3	Michael Kinane	Aidan O'Brien	2:27.20
2001	Dearly	3	Fran Berry	John Oxx	2:11.20
2002	Irresistible Jewel	3	Pat Smullen	Dermot Weld	2:08.70
2003	Chorist	4	Darryll Holland	William Haggas	2:02.60
2004	Monturani	5	Ted Durcan	Geoff Wragg	2:05.40
2005	Red Bloom	4	Kieren Fallon	Sir Michael Stoute	2:05.10
2006	Red Bloom	5	Jamie Spencer	Sir Michael Stoute	2:05.70
2007	Four Sins	3	Michael Kinane	John Oxx	2:09.34
2008	Katiyra	3	Michael Kinane	John Oxx	2:14.30
2009	Chinese White	4	Pat Smullen	Dermot Weld	2:17.35
2010	Eleanora Duse	3	Ryan Moore	Sir Michael Stoute	2:10.69
2011	Manieree	3	Niall McCullagh	John Oxx	2:12.00
2012	Up	3	Joseph O'Brien	Aidan O'Brien	2:03.00
2013	Belle de Crecy	4	Johnny Murtagh	Johnny Murtagh	2:04.75
2014	Tarfasha	3	Pat Smullen	Dermot Weld	2:04.67
2015	Ribbons	5	Tom Queally	James Fanshawe	2:10.14
2016	Shamreen	3	Pat Smullen	Dermot Weld	2:12.52
2017	Shamreen	4	Pat Smullen	Dermot Weld	2:12.84
2018	Eziyra	4	Declan McDonogh	Dermot Weld	2:07.50
2019	Tarnawa	3	Chris Hayes	Dermot Weld	2:09.41
2020	Cayenne Pepper	3	Shane Foley	Jessica Harrington	2:09.18
2021	La Petite Coco	3	Billy Lee	Paddy Twomey	2:08.39
2022	Above The Curve	3	Ryan Moore	Joseph O'Brien	2:12.29
2023	Lumiere Rock	3	Dylan Browne McMonagle	Joseph O'Brien	2:07.89
2024	Hanalia	3	Shane Foley	Johnny Murtagh	2:05.38
2025	Barnavara	3	Shane Foley	Mrs John Harrington	2:05.08
2026	Thundering On	3	Ryan Moore	Joseph O'Brien	2:04.29

== Earlier winners ==
- 1947: Esprit de France
- 1948: Wild Johnnie
- 1949: Pink Larkspur
- 1950: Beau Sire
- 1951: Do Well
- 1952: Thirteen of Diamonds
- 1953: Ardent Lover
- 1954: Northern Gleam
- 1955: Nile Bird
- 1956: Jongleur
- 1957: Roistar
- 1958: Royal Highway
- 1959: Little Mo
- 1960: Hunch
- 1961: Silver Moon *
- 1962: Sicilian Prince
- 1963: Feemoss
- 1964: Biscayne
- 1965: Donato
- 1966: Royal Display
- 1967: Dominion Day
- 1968: Wenona
- 1969: Barrons Court
- 1970: Riboprince
- 1971: Wenceslas
- 1972: Manitoulin
- 1973: Miss Therese
- 1974: Richard Grenville
- 1975: King Pellinore
- 1976: Northern Treasure
- 1977: Panamint
- 1978: Valley Forge
- 1979: Bohemian Grove

* The 1961 winner Silver Moon was later renamed Silver Dollar.

== See also ==
- Horse racing in Ireland
- List of Irish flat horse races
