= Pipalong Stakes =

Flat horse race in Britain

Pipalong Stakes
2026
Radiant Beauty	Crystal Flyer	Arisaig

Previous years
2025
Royal Dress	Cheshire Dancer	Imperial Quarter
2024
Caernarfon	Doha	Elim
2023
Dha Leath	Espressoo	Purplepay
2022
Thunder Beauty	Let's	Dubai Love
2021
Lights On	Agincourt	Waliyak

2020-2011
2020
Romola	Iconic Choice	Salayel
2019
Exhort	Billesdon Brook	Agincourt
2018
Clon Coulis	Promising Run	Pattie
2017
Lincoln Rocks	Dawn Of Hope	Pirouette
2016
Spirit Raiser	Black Cherry	Lil Sophella
2015
Nakuti	Merry Me	Pelerin
2014
Audacia	Dutch Rose	Vanity Rules
2013
Gifted Girl	Ladys First	Ultrasonic
2012 - waterlogged
2011
Law Of The Range	Fontley	Off Chance

2010-2003
2010
Off Chance	Please Sing	Tropical Paradise
2009
Rosaleen	Just Lille	Lady Rangali
2008
Kasumi	Flying Clarets	Steam Cuisine
2007
Expensive	Mont Etoile	Passion Fruit
2006
Bahia Breeze	Mamela	Imperialistic
2005
Red Bloom	Summitville	Golden Island
2004
Chorist	Ice Palace	Quiet Storm
2003
Macadamia	Monturani	Ryme Intrinseca

The Pipalong Stakes is a Listed flat horse race in Great Britain open to mares and fillies aged four years or older. It is run at Pontefract over a distance of 1 mile and 6 yards (1,615 metres), and it is scheduled to take place each year in July.

The race was first run in 2003.

== Records ==
Leading jockey (2 wins):

- Ben Curtis – Nakuti (2015), Clon Coulis (2018)
- Robert Winston – Red Bloom (2005), Bahia Breeze (2006)
- Ryan Moore - Romola (2020), Lights On (2021)
- Daniel Tudhope - Lincoln Rocks (2017), Thunder Beauty (2022)

Leading trainer (3 wins):

- Sir Michael Stoute – Red Bloom (2005), Romola (2020), Lights On (2021)

== Winners ==
Year	Winner	Age	Jockey	Trainer	Time
2003	Macadamia	4	Jamie Spencer	James Fanshawe	1:42.81
2004	Chorist	5	Kieren Fallon	William Haggas	1:43.30
2005	Red Bloom	4	Robert Winston	Sir Michael Stoute	1:42.60
2006	Bahia Breeze	4	Robert Winston	Rae Guest	1:47.21
2007	Expensive	4	Eddie Ahern	Chris Wall	1:44.81
2008	Kasumi	5	Travis Block	Hughie Morrison	1:43.16
2009	Rosaleen	4	Martin Dwyer	Brian Meehan	1:44.31
2010	Off Chance	4	Duran Fentiman	Tim Easterby	1:43.94
2011	Law Of The Range	4	Silvestre de Sousa	Marco Botti	1:44.68
2012	Abandoned due to waterlogging
2013	Gifted Girl	4	Tom Queally	Paul Cole	1:44.05
2014	Audacia	4	Graham Lee	Hugo Palmer	1:52.09
2015	Nakuti	4	Ben Curtis	Sylvester Kirk	1:45.93
2016	Spirit Raiser	5	Frederik Tylicki	James Fanshawe	1:45.93
2017	Lincoln Rocks	4	Danny Tudhope	David O'Meara	1:46.75
2018	Clon Coulis	4	Ben Curtis	David Barron	1:45.89
2019	Exhort	4	Paul Hanagan	Richard Fahey	1:45.39
2020	Romola	4	Ryan Moore	Sir Michael Stoute	1:43.73
2021	Lights On	4	Ryan Moore	Sir Michael Stoute	1:46.22
2022	Thunder Beauty	4	Daniel Tudhope	David O'Meara	1:43.67
2023	Dha Leath	5	P. J. McDonald	Gavin Cromwell	1:43.96
2024	Caernarfon	4	Tom Marquand	Jack Channon	1:46.20
2025	Royal Dress	5	Clifford Lee	James Tate	1:41.87
2026	Radiant Beauty	5	James Doyle	James Owen	1:41.14

== See also ==
- Horse racing in Great Britain
- List of British flat horse races
