= Kieran Shoemark =

English flat racing jockey

Personal information
- Born: January 1996 (age 30) Stow-on-the-Wold, Gloucestershire
- Occupation: Jockey

Horse racing career
- Sport: Horse racing

Kieran Shoemark (born January 1996) is an English jockey who competes in flat racing and has won a number of Group 1 races.

== Early life ==
Shoemark was born in Stow-on-the-Wold in Gloucestershire and grew up in a family steeped in racing. His older brother Conor, his father, grandfather and great-uncles all rode in National Hunt racing. He attended The Cotswold School, where he was more interested in sport than academic studies. Aged sixteen, when working at the Kingsclere yard of trainer Andrew Balding, he did a four-week foundation course at the British Racing School in Newmarket.

== Career as a jockey ==
Shoemark stayed at Balding's yard for three years, spending two winters riding in Australia. He then moved on to the yard of Roger Charlton in Wiltshire. In 2017, while still an apprentice jockey, Shoemark secured his first Royal Ascot victory when Atty Persse won the King George V Stakes. That season he narrowly missed out on the British flat racing Champion Apprentice title, riding 52 winners to David Egan's 53. At the end of June 2018, he was injured in a fall at Lingfield, suffering six broken ribs, a punctured lung and concussion. During his two-month recovery, he turned to alcohol and cocaine. In November 2018, he tested positive for cocaine at Kempton Park and received a six-month ban. Having addressed his drug and alcohol problems, Shoemark got his career back on track and secured his first Group 1 victory when Lady Bowthorpe won the Nassau Stakes at Goodwood in July 2021. It was trainer William Jarvis's first Group 1 win for 27 years.

In 2024, Shoemark was appointed stable jockey for trainers John & Thady Gosden, although his rides were restricted as some of the yard's owners had their own retained jockeys. He rode his first Group 1 winner for the Gosdens when Friendly Soul won the Prix de l'Opéra at Longchamp in October 2024. Earlier in the year he had ridden a number of winners for them in Listed and Group 2 and 3 races. Following the narrow defeat of favourite Field of Gold in the 2025 2000 Guineas, the Gosdens announced that Shoemark would no longer be their number one jockey. Other trainers showed their support for Shoemark. His first winner after being demoted was Up The Pace, a 33/1 outsider in a handicap at Ascot for trainer Edward Smyth-Osborne, who said after the race: "Kieran's a top jockey for a reason. He's very, very good..." Trainer Charlie Fellowes booked Shoemark to ride Luther and Shes Perfect in the French classics, the Poule d'Essai des Poulains and Poule d'Essai des Pouliches, at Longchamp on 11 May 2025. Luther out-ran his odds of 46/1 and an unlucky draw to finish fourth in the Poule d'Essai des Poulains (the French equivalent of the 2000 Guineas). Shes Perfect, a filly bought by a syndicate for €50,000, started at 18/1 in the Poule d'Essai des Pouliches (the French equivalent of the 1000 Guineas) and finished first past the post, a nose in front of odds-on favourite Zarigana, only for the result to be overturned after a stewards' enquiry.

Shoemark rode two winners at Royal Ascot in June 2025, both for trainer Ed Walker. Never Let Go won the Sandringham Handicap at odds of 22/1 and then Noble Champion won the Group 3 Jersey Stakes at odds of 25/1. After winning the Sandringham Handicap, Shoemark said: "I needed a winner here this week. It's been a tough six weeks or so". He said he was overwhelmed by the messages of support he had received. The following month, he achieved a Group 2 success in France when Qilin Queen, trained by Walker, beat odds-on favourite Sunly, who was ridden by Colin Keane in the colours of Juddmonte.

== Major wins ==
(United Kingdom) Great Britain

- Nassau Stakes - (1) Lady Bowthorpe (2021)
- Queen Anne Stakes - (1) Ten Bob Tony (2026)

(Republic of Ireland) Ireland

- Tattersalls Gold Cup - (1) Almaqam (2026)

France

- Prix d'Ispahan - (1) Dreamloper (2022)
- Prix du Moulin de Longchamp - (1) Dreamloper (2022)
- Prix de l'Opéra - (1) Friendly Soul (2024)
