= Danny Tudhope =

Scottish jockey (b.1985)

Daniel Tudhope
Personal information
- Born: 1 December 1985 (age 40)
- Occupation: Jockey
- Height: 5 ft 7 in (170 cm)
- Weight: 8 st (112 lb; 51 kg) 11in

Horse racing career
- Sport: Horse racing

Major racing wins
- Major races Haydock Sprint Cup (2014); Prix de l'Abbaye (2014); Arlington Million (2016); Shadwell Turf Mile Stakes (2017); Sun Chariot Stakes (2018); Queen Anne Stakes (2019)

Significant horses
- Custom Cut, G Force, Laurens, Lord Glitters, Mondialiste, Move In Time, Penitent, Suedois

Daniel Tudhope (born 1 December 1985) is a Scottish horse racing jockey.

== Background ==
Tudhope grew up in Irvine, Ayrshire, Scotland. He had no family connection with racing, and only considered a career as a jockey when it was suggested to him by a careers advisor. He graduated from the Northern Racing College and was apprentice to Declan Carroll in Yorkshire.

== Career ==
He had his first professional rides in 2003, and won his first race at San Rossore, Pisa, Italy in October of that year as part of an initiative for young riders to compete across Europe. It wasn't until 2004 that he registered his first domestic victory at Southwell. His first black type victory was not until several years after that, when he won the 2008 Listed Land o' Burns Fillies Stakes at Ayr on an outside ride for Alan Berry. His filly, Look Busy, got up late to win by a short head from Princess Ellis.

With O'Meara, Tudhope's career took off. In 2011, he won his first group race, the Group 2 Henry II Stakes on Blue Bajan, a horse he also finished second on in the Yorkshire Cup and third in the Goodwood Cup. He also began a very profitable partnership with miler Penitent, on which he won the 2012 Bet365 Mile at Sandown, the 2012 Joel Stakes at Newmarket and the 2014 John of Gaunt Stakes at Haydock, as well as several Listed races. Another miler, Custom Cut, proved equally successful, also winning the Bet365 Mile and Joel Stakes, as well as the Strensall Stakes and Leopardstown's Desmond Stakes and Boomerang Stakes. Over the course of a month in 2014, he won his first and second victories at Group 1 level, the 2014 Haydock Sprint Cup on G Force and the Prix de l'Abbaye on Move In Time. Both were trained by O'Meara.

This period of success meant that in 2013, he first topped 100 winners in a year and in 2014, he first won more than £1 million in prize money.

Throughout 2016 and 2017, he won several notable British handicaps - the Old Newton Cup on Tawdeea, the Lincoln on Bravery, and the Wokingham at Royal Ascot on Out Do. His biggest wins have come in America, however. On Mondialiste, he won the 2016 Arlington Million and in 2017, he won the Shadwell Turf Mile Stakes on Suedois, his biggest prize to date of nearly £500,000. In 2017, he also won over £1.5 million in UK prize money.

In 2019, he won four races at Royal Ascot and was an early contender for Champion Jockey, although he would ultimately lose out in the championship to Oisin Murphy. He also passed the 1,000 winner mark in June.

He is currently retained jockey for businessman Steve Parkin and has to lose 3lbs every morning to meet his riding weight of 8st 11lb.

== Personal life ==
He is married to Kate, who runs a nursery school in Thirsk.

== Statistics ==
Flat wins in Great Britain by year

Year	Wins	Runs	Strike rate	Total earnings
2003	0	14	0	£864
2004	28	219	13	£136,848
2005	33	355	9	£233,007
2006	53	470	11	£290,199
2007	46	367	13	£237,700
2008	22	261	8	£242,827
2009	23	301	8	£281,168
2010	6	124	5	£66,386
2011	43	385	11	£471,222
2012	76	488	16	£700,842
2013	100	575	17	£841,234
2014	110	666	17	£1,428,400
2015	84	485	17	£933,926
2016	90	595	15	£1,089,471
2017	122	735	17	£1,612,101
2018	116	696	17	£2,042,707

== Major wins ==
(United Kingdom) Great Britain

- Haydock Sprint Cup - (1) - G Force (2014)
- Queen Anne Stakes - (1) - Lord Glitters (2019)
- Sun Chariot Stakes - (1) - Laurens (2018)

France

- Prix de l'Abbaye - (1) - Move In Time (2014)
- Prix Rothschild - (1) - Fallen Angel (2025)

(Republic of Ireland) Ireland

- Irish 1,000 Guineas - (1) - Fallen Angel (2024)
- Matron Stakes - (1) - Laurens (2018)
- Moyglare Stud Stakes - (1) - Fallen Angel (2023)
- Pretty Polly Stakes - (2) Urban Fox (2018), Estrange (2026)

United Arab Emirates

- Jebel Hatta - (1) - Lord Glitters (2021)

United States

- Arlington Million - (1) - Mondialiste (2016)
- Shadwell Turf Mile Stakes - (1) -Suedois (2017)
