= Veracious (horse) =

British Thoroughbred racehorse

- Sire: Frankel
- Grandsire: Galileo
- Dam: Infallible
- Damsire: Pivotal
- Sex: Mare
- Foaled: 17 February 2015
- Country: United Kingdom
- Colour: Bay
- Breeder: Cheveley Park Stud
- Owner: Cheveley Park Stud
- Trainer: Michael Stoute
- Record: 15: 4-1-4
- Earnings: £465,635

Major wins
- Atalanta Stakes (2018); Falmouth Stakes (2019); Dick Hern Fillies' Stakes (2020)

Veracious (foaled 17 February 2015) is a British Thoroughbred racehorse. She showed promise as a juvenile in 2017 when she won the second of her two starts and went on to demonstrate high class form in the following year, winning the Atalanta Stakes and running third in both the Coronation Stakes and the Nassau Stakes. As a four-year-old in 2019 she recorded her biggest success when she took the Falmouth Stakes.

== Background ==
Veracious is a bay mare with a small white star bred and owned by the Cheveley Park Stud. She was sent into training with Michael Stoute at Freemason Lodge Stables in Newmarket, Suffolk.

She was from the second crop of foals sired by Frankel, an undefeated racehorse whose other progeny have included Cracksman, Logician, Anapurna, Soul Stirring and Without Parole. Veracious's dam Infallible showed top-class form, winning the Nell Gwyn Stakes and finishing second in both the Coronation Stakes and the Falmouth Stakes and went on to be a successful broodmare who produced several other winners including Mutakayyef (Summer Mile Stakes). She was descended from the Kentucky-bred mare Some Romance, who won the Frizette Stakes and the Matron Stakes in 1989.

== Racing career ==
=== 2017: two-year-old season ===
Veracious made her racecourse debut on 22 September in a minor event over seven furlongs at Newbury Racecourse in which she started the 3/1 favourite and finished third behind Magnolia Springs and Melodies. On 13 October the filly contested a maiden race over the same distance at Newmarket Racecourse and was made the 3/1 second choice in a twelve-runner field. Ridden as in her first outing by Ryan Moore she took the lead approaching the final furlong and drew away to win "easily" by four lengths.

=== 2018: three-year-old season ===
After an absence of more than eight months, Veracious made a belated three-year-old debut in the Group 1 Coronation Stakes at Royal Ascot on 22 June in which she was ridden by Frankie Dettori. Starting a 14/1 outsider she took the lead at half way and although she was overtaken by Alpha Centauri approaching the final furlong she kept on well to finish third of the twelve runners with Billesdon Brook, Clemmie and Teppal running behind. On 2 August the filly was moved up in distance for the ten-furlong Nassau Stakes at Goodwood Racecourse. With Dettori again in the saddle she ran third behind Wild Illusion and Urban Fox with Billesdon Brook in fourth and Rhododendron coming home last of the six runners.

Veracious was partnered by Moore on 1 September when she was dropped back in class for the Group 3 Atalanta Stakes at Sandown Park and started the 10/11 favourite against five opponents. After racing in second place behind Awesometank she went to the front two furlongs out and won "readily" by a length and a quarter. After the race Moore said "She's a really nice filly, she's run well in two Group Ones and a stronger pace would have suited her better. I was in front earlier than I would have wanted, but she can only win and there was a bit left in the tank at the end. She's a very honest filly, she just doesn't do a whole lot when she gets to the front".

On her final appearance of the year, Veracious contested the Sun Chariot Stakes at Newmarket on 6 October. She was in contention for most of the way before fading in the closing stages and coming home sixth of the nine runners behind Laurens.

=== 2019: four-year-old season ===
On 5 May Veracious made her first appearance as a four-year-old in the Group 2 Dahlia Stakes at Newmarket in which she started the 5/4 favourite but finished fourth to Worth Waiting after looking to be outpaced in the final stages of the nine furlong contest. She was the beaten favourite again in the Princess Elizabeth Stakes at Epsom Racecourse on 1 June when she came home third behind Anna Nerium and Awesometank. Having been ridden by Moore on her first starts of the year she was partnered by Oisin Murphy when she finished fourth behind Move Swiftly in the Duke of Cambridge Stakes at Royal Ascot.

Murphy was again in the saddle when Veracious contested the Group 1 Falmouth Stakes over one mile at Newmarket on 12 July and started the 6/1 fifth choice in a six-runner field. The Irish filly I Can Fly (runner-up in the Queen Elizabeth II Stakes) started favourite with the other contenders being One Master, Qabala (Nell Gwyn Stakes), Beshaayir (Lanwades Stud Stakes) and Mot Juste (Oh So Sharp Stakes). In a change of tactics Veracious was sent into the lead from the start and was never headed, staying on well under pressure in the closing stages to win by a neck from One Master with I Can Fly almost three lengths back in third. Michael Stoute, who was winning the race for the sixth time, said "It was a very brave performance, and [Oisin Murphy] rode her beautifully. She ran very well at Ascot but was always doing a little too much, and we didn't want that again today. He let her flow, and she was game. She's taken a long time to really ripen, and, actually, Ryan Moore rode her a couple of weeks ago and said, 'She's there now.'"

At Newmarket on 5 October Veracious made her second attempt to win the Sun Chariot Stakes. She recovered from a slow start to take the lead approaching the final furlong but was overtaken in the closing stages by Billesdon Brook and beaten one and a half lengths into second place. Two weeks later on her final run of the year the filly was matched against male opposition in the Queen Elizabeth II Stakes on heavy ground at Ascot. Ridden by Jason Watson, she led from the start and opened up a clear lead on her rivals before tiring in the last quarter mile and finishing fourth behind King of Change.

=== 2020: five-year-old season ===
After undergoing wind surgery, Veracious resumed her racing career after a 293-day break in the Dick Hern Fillies' Stakes at Haydock Park on 8 August. Starting the 11/10 favourite, Veracious always travelled strongly under jockey Ryan Moore. She picked up well to grab the lead and had enough in reserve to win by three-quarters of a length. Moore said after the race "I was happy with her. It was her first run for a while and she should come on for it. She did what she had to today."

Veracious returned after another break on 3 October to contest her third Sun Chariot Stakes and finished ninth behind Nazeef, tiring badly in the final furlong after running well for most of the way. Two weeks later the mare started a 50/1 outsider for the Queen Elizabeth II Stakes in which she was ridden by Tom Marquand and stayed on steadily without ever looking likely to win and came home fifth of the fourteen runners behind The Revenant.

== Pedigree ==
Pedigree of Veracious (GB), bay mare, 2015
Sire Frankel (GB) 2008	Galileo (IRE); 1998	Sadler's Wells (USA)	Northern Dancer (CAN)
Sire Frankel (GB) 2008	Galileo (IRE); 1998	Sadler's Wells (USA)	Fairy Bridge
Sire Frankel (GB) 2008	Galileo (IRE); 1998	Urban Sea (USA)	Miswaki
Sire Frankel (GB) 2008	Galileo (IRE); 1998	Urban Sea (USA)	Allegretta (GB)
Sire Frankel (GB) 2008	Kind (IRE); 2001	Danehill (USA)	Danzig
Sire Frankel (GB) 2008	Kind (IRE); 2001	Danehill (USA)	Razyana
Sire Frankel (GB) 2008	Kind (IRE); 2001	Rainbow Lake (GB)	Rainbow Quest (USA)
Sire Frankel (GB) 2008	Kind (IRE); 2001	Rainbow Lake (GB)	Rockfest (USA)
Dam Infallible (GB) 2005	Pivotal (GB); 1993	Polar Falcon (USA)	Nureyev
Dam Infallible (GB) 2005	Pivotal (GB); 1993	Polar Falcon (USA)	Marie d'Argonne (FR)
Dam Infallible (GB) 2005	Pivotal (GB); 1993	Fearless Revival	Cozzene (USA)
Dam Infallible (GB) 2005	Pivotal (GB); 1993	Fearless Revival	Stufida
Dam Infallible (GB) 2005	Irresistible (GB); 2000	Cadeaux Genereux	Young Generation (IRE)
Dam Infallible (GB) 2005	Irresistible (GB); 2000	Cadeaux Genereux	Smarten Up
Dam Infallible (GB) 2005	Irresistible (GB); 2000	Polish Romance (USA)	Danzig
Dam Infallible (GB) 2005	Irresistible (GB); 2000	Polish Romance (USA)	Some Romance (Family: 2-s)

- Veracious was inbred 4 × 4 to Danzig, meaning that this stallion appears twice in the fourth generation of her pedigree.
