= Billesdon Brook =

British-bred Thoroughbred racehorse

- Racing silks of Pall Mall Partners & Mrs R J McCreery
- Sire: Champs Elysees
- Grandsire: Danehill
- Dam: Coplow
- Damsire: Manduro
- Sex: Filly
- Foaled: 24 February 2015
- Died: 10 May 2022 (aged 7)
- Country: Great Britain
- Colour: Chestnut
- Breeder: Stowell Hill Partners
- Owner: Pall Mall Partners; Mrs R. J. McCreery
- Trainer: Richard Hannon Jr.
- Record: 26: 7-7-3
- Earnings: £755,633

Major wins
- Prestige Stakes (2017); 1000 Guineas (2018); Queen Charlotte Fillies' Stakes (2019); Oak Tree Stakes (2019); Sun Chariot Stakes (2019)

Billesdon Brook (24 February 2015 – 10 May 2022) was a British Thoroughbred racehorse. She was a useful and consistent juvenile in 2017, winning three races including the Prestige Stakes and being placed on four of her other five starts. In the following spring she ran fourth on her seasonal debut and then recorded a 66/1 upset win in the 1000 Guineas. She failed to win again that year but returned to form in 2019 to win the Queen Charlotte Fillies' Stakes, Oak Tree Stakes and Sun Chariot Stakes. As a five-year-old she was unable to win in six attempts but finished second in four races including the Falmouth Stakes.

== Background ==
Billesdon Brook was a chestnut filly with a white blaze bred in England by Stowell Hill Partners. During her racing career she carried the red and green colours of the Pall Mall Partners and was trained by Richard Hannon Jr. at Everleigh in Wiltshire.

She was from the fourth crop of foals sired by Champs Elysees whose wins included the Hollywood Turf Cup Stakes, Northern Dancer Turf Stakes and Canadian International Stakes. Before Billesdon Brook, the best-known of his progeny was the Ascot Gold Cup winner Trip To Paris. She was the second foal of Coplow, a mare who failed to win in eight races but made a promising start to her broodmare career by producing the Upavon Fillies' Stakes winner Billesdon Bess. She is a granddaughter of the Preis der Diana winner Anna Paola whose other descendants have included Annie Power, Helmet, National Defense (Prix Jean-Luc Lagardère), Annus Mirabilis (Mainichi Okan), Middle Club (Prix d'Aumale) and Piping Rock (Horris Hill Stakes).

Geographically, Billesdon Brook is a stream in the Leicestershire village of Billesdon: Coplow Lane is 300 metres to the north.

== Racing career ==
=== 2017: two-year-old season ===
Billesdon Brook began her racing career by finishing third in a maiden race over five furlongs at Salisbury Racecourse on 30 April. She finished second when favourite for her next two races, a novice stakes (for horses with no more than two wins) at Goodwood Racecourse in May and a similar event at Salisbury in June. On 5 July the filly started the 8/15 favourite for a novice stakes over seven furlongs on the Polytrack synthetic surface at Kempton Park. Ridden by Ryan Moore, she took the lead a furlong out and drew away to win by six lengths from Last Enchantment.

The filly was moved up in class for the Listed Star Stakes at Sandown Park later that month and was partnered by Sean Levey, who had ridden her in her first two races. She took the lead two furlongs out but despite staying on well she was caught in the final strides and beaten a nose and a neck by Tajaanus and Capomento. A week later she was matched against male opposition and was assigned top weight of 129 pounds in a nursery (a handicap race for juveniles) at Goodwood. In a very rough race she was denied a clear run until the final furlong but then produced a strong finishing burst to win by a head from her stablemate Cheeky Rascal.

The Prestige Stakes at Goodwood on 26 August saw Billesdon Brook stepped up to Group 3 class and start the 4/1 second favourite behind the John Gosden-trained Verandah. After being restrained by Levey in the early stages she began to make rapid progress in the last quarter mile, caught Whitefountainfairy 100 yards out and won by three-quarters of a length. After the race Richard Hannon said "I was very impressed. The fact she quickened past horses that were already quickening at the time was impressive. Ryan Moore said he thought when she gets to the front she does just enough and I think she did that there. Sean gave her a lovely ride and kept filling her up." On her final appearance of the year she finished fifth in the Group 2 May Hill Stakes at Doncaster Racecourse but was only three and a half lengths behind the winner Laurens (later to take the Fillies' Mile).

=== 2018: three-year-old season ===
On 18 April Billesdon Brook began her second season in the Nell Gwyn Stakes (a major trial race for the 1000 Guineas) over seven furlongs at Newmarket Racecourse. She appeared to recover from a poor start but never looked likely to win and finished fourth behind the Godolphin filly Soliloquy. On 6 May Billesdon Brook started the 66/1 outsider in a fifteen-runner field for the 205th running of the 1000 Guineas over the Rowley Mile. Happily started favourite while the other fancied runners included Soliloquy, Laurens, Wild Illusion (Prix Marcel Boussac) and I Can Fly. Billesdon Brook raced towards the rear of the field before making a forward move approaching the last quarter mile. She passed at least ten horses in a matter of strides to take the lead a furlong out and won by one and three quarter lengths from Laurens with Happily taking third ahead of Wild Illusion. Her winning odds made her the longest-priced winner in the race's history, eclipsing Ferry's 50/1 success in 1918. Richard Hannon admitted that the filly was not the best fancied of his three runners in the race but insisted that there was "no fluke" about her victory while Levey said "She ran "gassy" in the Nell Gwyn. I thought she'd improve and that if everything fell into place for her she would be in the first four. But I was so happy at halfway and was counting down the horses I had left to pass at the two-furlong marker. I just hoped she would keep running, but she sailed all the way to the line". Levey, who is of Irish and Swazi parentage, was described as the first black jockey to win a British Classic Race.

At Royal Ascot in June Billesdon Brook started 9/2 second favourite for the Group 1 Coronation Stakes. After being restrained towards the rear of the field she stayed on steadily in the straight but never looked likely to win and came home fourth of the twelve runners behind Alpha Centauri. The filly was then stepped up in distance for the ten-furlong Nassau Stakes at Goodwood and finished fourth again, beaten three and a half lengths by the winner Wild Illusion. On her only other appearance that year, Billesdon Brook finished fifth to Laurens in the Sun Chariot Stakes at Newmarket in October.

=== 2019: four-year-old season ===
On her first appearance as a four-year-old Billesdon Brook contested the Group 2 Dahlia Stakes over nine furlongs at Newmarket on 5 May and finished a well-beaten third behind Worth Waiting and Nyaleti in a five-runner field. Thirteen days later at Newbury Racecourse she was matched against male opposition in the Group 1 Lockinge Stakes and came home ninth behind the six-year-old gelding Mustashry at odds of 33/1. In June the filly was dropped in class and distance for the Listed Queen Charlotte Fillies' Stakes over seven furlongs on Polytrack at Chelmsford City Racecourse and started the 5/1 third choice in the betting behind Victory Wave and Solar Gold. After racing in mid-division she made progress in the last quarter mile, took the lead 100 yards from the finish and won by a length from Crossing The Line to record her first success for over a year.

Three weeks after her win at Chelmsford Billesdon Brook attempted to follow up in the Pipalong Stakes over one mile at Pontefract Racecourse but after taking the lead 50 yards from the finish she was caught in the final strides by the 25/1 outsider Exhort and beaten three quarters of a length into second place. At Goodwood on 2 August the filly, with Levey in the saddle as usual, went off at odds of 12/1 for the Group 3 Oak Tree Stakes over seven furlongs. The three-year-old Jubiloso (third in the Coronation Stakes) started favourite in a seventeen-runner field which also included Angel's Hideaway (Princess Margaret Stakes), Royal Intervention (Summer Stakes) and Pretty Baby (winner of the race in 2018). Billesdon Brook was restrained towards the rear before producing a sustained run in the last quarter mile and gained the advantage in the closing stages and won by a neck and three quarters of a length from Perfection and Jubiloso. After the race Hannon said "she always turns up and runs her race every time... She has been a star for us. People slightly forgot her after she won the Guineas, but there was no fluke about that. She looked like a monster when she won her nursery here. She is just a really sweet filly."

On 5 October at Newmarket Billesdon Brook started a 16/1 outsider as she made her second attempt to win the Sun Chariot Stakes. Laurens and Hermosa started joint-favourites while the other fancied runners were Iridessa, Lavender's Blue (Atalanta Stakes), Veracious and I Can Fly. Billesdon Brook broke well but was hampered soon after the start and dropped back in the field as Laurens went to the front and set the pace. Levey had some trouble finding a clear run for Billesdon Brook in the last quarter mile but when the filly obtained room to race she produced a strong late run, overtook the leader Veracious well inside the final furlong and won by one and a half lengths. Hannon commented "Form may be temporary but class is permanent and you don't win a Guineas and be average. We've moved her from Herridge Stables to Everleigh and the change of scene has done her good. As well as that, her work rider Luke Catton has done a good job with settling her down. That was a good performance as there were plenty fancied in it, and Sean gave her a lovely waiting ride. I would like her to stay in training for the next 20 years."

For her final run of the season the filly was sent to California to contest the Breeders' Cup Filly & Mare Turf over ten furlongs at Santa Anita Park on 2 November. She was made the 10/1 fourth choice in the betting but never looked likely to win and finished eighth behind Iridessa.

=== 2020: five-year-old season ===
Billesdon Brook began her five-year-old season in the Listed Snowdrop Fillies' Stakes over one mile on the Polytrack surface at Kempton Park on 3 June, and led until the final furlong before finishing second by three quarters of a length to Nazeef. Thirteen days later she started a 22/1 outsider for the Queen Anne Stakes at Royal Ascot and came home ninth of the fifteen runners. On 4 July she went off favourite for the Queen Charlotte Fillies' Stakes at Chelmsford but was beaten into second place by the front-running four-year-old Miss Celestial. Six days later she returned to Group 1 class for the Falmouth Stakes at Newmarket and started a 14/1 outsider in a six-runner field. She produced her best effort of the year as she stayed on strongly in the closing stages to take second place behind Nazeef, beaten a neck by the winner. In August she ran second to Maamora in the Atalanta Stakes over one mile at Sandown. In October Billesdon Brook ran for the third time in the Sun Chariot Stakes but failed to reproduce her 2019 form as she came home eighth of the twelve runners behind Nazeef, beaten five and three quarter lengths by the winner.

== Breeding record ==
At the end of her racing career, Billesdon Brook returned to her birthplace to become a broodmare at the Stowell Hill Stud in Somerset. She gave birth to a foal by Dubawi in 2022, later named King's Norton, but was euthanized in May 2022 after suffering an intestinal blockage. King's Norton made his debut in December 2024, running unplaced in a novice stakes at Kempton Park.

== Pedigree ==
Pedigree of Billesdon Brook (GB), chestnut filly, 2015
Sire Champs Elysees (GB) 2003	Danehill (USA); 1986	Danzig	Northern Dancer
Sire Champs Elysees (GB) 2003	Danehill (USA); 1986	Danzig	Pas de Nom
Sire Champs Elysees (GB) 2003	Danehill (USA); 1986	Razyana	His Majesty
Sire Champs Elysees (GB) 2003	Danehill (USA); 1986	Razyana	Spring Adieu
Sire Champs Elysees (GB) 2003	Hasili (IRE); 1991	Kahyasi	Ile de Bourbon
Sire Champs Elysees (GB) 2003	Hasili (IRE); 1991	Kahyasi	Kadissya
Sire Champs Elysees (GB) 2003	Hasili (IRE); 1991	Kerali (GB)	High Line
Sire Champs Elysees (GB) 2003	Hasili (IRE); 1991	Kerali (GB)	Sookera
Dam Coplow (GB) 2009	Manduro (GER); 2002	Monsun	Konigsstuhl
Dam Coplow (GB) 2009	Manduro (GER); 2002	Monsun	Mosella
Dam Coplow (GB) 2009	Manduro (GER); 2002	Mandellicht (IRE)	Be My Guest (USA)
Dam Coplow (GB) 2009	Manduro (GER); 2002	Mandellicht (IRE)	Mandelauge (GER)
Dam Coplow (GB) 2009	Anna Oleanda (IRE); 1998	Old Vic (GB)	Sadler's Wells
Dam Coplow (GB) 2009	Anna Oleanda (IRE); 1998	Old Vic (GB)	Cockade
Dam Coplow (GB) 2009	Anna Oleanda (IRE); 1998	Anna Paola (GER)	Prince Ippi
Dam Coplow (GB) 2009	Anna Oleanda (IRE); 1998	Anna Paola (GER)	Antwerpen (Family: 7-f)
