= Atalanta Stakes =

Flat horse race in Britain

- Class: Group 3
- Location: Sandown Park; Esher, England
- Race type: Flat / Thoroughbred
- Sponsor: BetMGM
- Website: Sandown Park

Race information
- Distance: 1m (1,609 metres)
- Surface: Turf
- Track: Right-handed
- Qualification: Three-years-old and up fillies and mares no G2 / G1 win since last Sept. 1
- Weight: 9 st 0 lb (3yo); 9 st 6 lb (4yo+); Penalties; 7 lb for Group 1 winners * 5 lb for Group 2 winners * 3 lb for Group 3 winners * * after 2024
- Purse: £85,000 (2025); 1st: £48,204

Atalanta Stakes
2026
| Love Dynasty | Noche Clasica | Moon Target |

Previous years
2025
Lady Of Spain | Blue Bolt | Skellet
2024
Tamfana | Doha | Imperial Quarter
2023
Heredia | Queen For You | Potapova
2022
Potapova | Grande Dame | Mrs Fitzherbert
2021
Saffron Beach | Waliyak | Ville De Grace

2020-2011
2020
Maamora | Billesdon Brook | Lavender's Blue
2019
Lavender's Blue | Duneflower | Look Around
2018
Veracious | Awesometank | Winter Lightning
2017
Aljazzi | Nathra | Tisbutadream
2016
Persuasive | Blond Me | Lucy The Painter
2015
Nakuti | Blond Me | Black Cherry
2014
Fintry | Odeliz | Water Hole
2013
Integral | Ladys First | Shuruq
2012
Dank | Ladys First | Gathering
2011
Theyskens' Theory | Modeyra | Brevity

2010-2001
2010
Seta | Long Lashes | Flora Trevelyan
2009
Strawberrydaiquiri | Ada River | Nashmiah
2008
Shabiba | Ada River | Ghaidaa
2007
Sweet Lilly | Heaven Sent | Basaata
2006
Wasseema | Bahia Breeze | La Mottie
2005
Musicanna | Golden Island | Teeba
2004
Zietory | Bayberry | Three Secrets
2003
Lady Bear | Zyzania | Play That Tune
2002
Miss Pinkerton | Mythic | Mamounia
2001
Intrepidous | Sayedah | Peaceful Paradise

2000-1991
2000
Out Of Reach | Moselle | Rosse
1999
Etizaaz | Selfish | Out Line
1998
Kissogram | Akarita | Supercal
1997
One So Wonderful | Dragonada | Apache Star
1996
Wandering Star | Miss Universal | Yamuna
1995
Private Line | Louis' Queen | A La Carte
1994
Ingozi | Andromaque | Devotee
1993
Lap Of Luxury | Reine De Neige | Queen's View
1992
Amwag | Melpomene | Petal Girl
1991
Hyabella | Shaima | Vallauris

1990-1988
1990
Arpero | Alwathba | Power Take Off
1989
Dimmer | Hooray Lady | Green's Seascape
1988
Dabaweyaa | New Trends | Suntrap

The Atalanta Stakes is a Group 3 flat horse race in Great Britain open to fillies and mares aged three years or older. It is run at Sandown Park over a distance of 1 mile (1,609 metres), and it is scheduled to take place each year in late August or early September.

The race was formerly classed at Listed level. It was promoted to Group 3 status in 2012.

The Atalanta Stakes was formerly part of the venue's Variety Club Day, an annual fundraising event for the Variety Club.

== Records ==
Most successful horse:

- no horse has won this race more than once.

Leading jockey (7 wins):

- Pat Eddery – Tsaritsa (1975), Triagonal (1984), Soprano (1985), Tahilla (1987), Hyabella (1991), Private Line (1995), One So Wonderful (1997)

Leading trainer (7 wins):

- Sir Michael Stoute – Tsaritsa (1975), Dabaweyaa (1988), Hyabella (1991), Wasseema (2006), Strawberrydaiquiri (2009), Dank (2012), Veracious (2018)

== Winners ==
| Year | Winner | Age | Jockey | Trainer | Time |
|---|---|---|---|---|---|
| 1924 | Jura | 3 | Frank Bullock | Alec Taylor Jr. | 2:33.60 |
| 1925 | Saucy Sue | 3 | Frank Bullock | Alec Taylor Jr. | 2:31.40 |
| 1926 | Foliation | 3 | Bobby Jones | Alec Taylor Jr. | 2:21.40 |
| 1927 | Cinq A Sept | 3 | Joe Childs | Cecil Boyd-Rochfort | 2:28.60 |
| 1928 | Lady Starlight | 3 | Freddie Fox | Richard Gooch | 2:17.40 |
| 1929 | Drift | 3 | Tommy Weston | Frank Butters | 2:13.00 |
| 1930 | Brantwood | 3 | Bobby Jones | Joseph Lawson | 2:15.60 |
| 1931 | Salome | 3 | Harry Wragg | Colledge Leader | 2:15.80 |
| 1932 | Speckle | 3 | Gordon Richards | Martin Hartigan | 2:18.60 |
| 1933 | Eclair | 3 | Joe Childs | Cecil Boyd-Rochfort | 2:11.40 |
| 1934 | Nisona | 3 | Jack Sirett | Walter Nightingall | 2:11.60 |
| 1935 | Cora Deans | 3 | Steve Donoghue | Basil Jarvis | 2:16.80 |
| 1936 | Felsetta | 3 | Tommy Weston | Joseph Lawson | 2:10.20 |
| 1937 | Spray | 3 | Doug Smith | Cecil Boyd-Rochfort | 2:11.00 |
| 1938 | Sybil | 3 | Jack Sirett | Jack Jarvis | 2:16.00 |
| | no race 1939-46 |
| 1947 | La Fleuriste | 3 | Charlie Elliott | Herbert Blagrave | 2:15.60 |
| 1948 | Young Entry | 3 | Michael Beary | Cecil Boyd-Rochfort | 2:10.60 |
| | no race 1949 |
| 1950 | Leading Question | 3 | Gordon Richards | C T J Houghton | 1:43.40 |
| 1951 | Sweet William | 4 | Charlie Smirke | Stanley Wootton | 1:48.80 |
| 1952 | Kriss Kringle | 3 | Gordon Richards | Charles Pratt | 1:52.80 |
| 1953 | Home Rule | 3 | Jack Sirett | George Colling | 2:25.40 |
| 1954 | Astraeus | 3 | Eph Smith | Cecil Boyd-Rochfort | 2:24.00 |
| 1955 | High Bhan | 3 | Tommy Burns Sr. | Paddy Prendergast | 2:13.40 |
| 1956 | Kandy Sauce | 3 | Lester Piggott | Noel Murless | 2:21.60 |
| 1957 | Rose Argent | 3 | Jack Purtell | Noel Cannon | 2:15.00 |
| 1958 | Wonder Belle | 3 | Scobie Breasley | Staff Ingham | 2:15.80 |
| 1959 | Sallymount | 3 | George Moore | Alec Head | 2:10.60 |
| 1960 | Green Gables | 3 | Eddie Cracknell | Harold Wallington | 2:13.60 |
| 1961 | Cipriani | 3 | Ron Hutchinson | Paddy Prendergast | 2:11.20 |
| 1962 | Aurelius | 4 | Lester Piggott | Noel Murless | 2:07.20 |
| 1963 | Negroni | 3 | Ron Hutchinson | Dick Thrale | 2:14.20 |
| 1964 | Lavenette | 3 | Taffy Thomas | Geoffrey Barling | 2:13.60 |
| 1965 | Credence | 3 | Geoff Lewis | Ian Balding | 2:27.80 |
| 1966 | Corbalton | 3 | Greville Starkey | Peter Nelson | 2:16.00 |
| 1967 | Negotiator | 3 | Bill Williamson | Walter Wharton | 1:43.40 |
| 1968 | Red Sunset | 3 | Scobie Breasley | Peter Nelson | 1:47.00 |
| 1969 | Quickmatch | 3 | Geoff Lewis | Ian Balding | 1:45.40 |
| 1970 | Strong Light | 3 | Joe Mercer | Derrick Candy | 1:45.00 |
| 1971 | Hitesca | 3 | Greville Starkey | John Winter | 1:49.50 |
| 1972 (Note: The 1972 running took place at Kempton Park) | Buss | 3 | Geoff Lewis | Arthur Budgett | 1:41.86 |
| | no race 1973 |
| | no race 1974 |
| 1975 | Tsaritsa | 3 | Pat Eddery | Michael Stoute | 1:42.31 |
| 1976 | Gale Bridge | 3 | Brian Taylor | Ryan Price | 1:43.12 |
| 1977 | Fawn | 3 | Joe Mercer | Henry Cecil | 1:50.99 |
| 1978 | Martingale | 3 | Joe Mercer | Henry Cecil | 1:44.44 |
| 1979 | Bonnie Isle | 3 | Lester Piggott | John Dunlop | 1:39.90 |
| 1980 | Rosia Bay | 3 | Willie Carson | William Hastings-Bass | 1:47.39 |
| 1981 (Note: The 1981 running took place at Kempton Park) | Vocalist | 3 | Lester Piggott | Frankie Durr | 1:44.57 |
| 1982 | Main Sail | 3 | Willie Carson | Dick Hern | 1:41.84 |
| 1983 | Linda's Fantasy | 3 | Willie Carson | Robert Armstrong | 1:39.08 |
| 1984 | Triagonal | 3 | Pat Eddery | Peter Walwyn | 1:42.53 |
| 1985 | Soprano | 3 | Pat Eddery | Ian Balding | 1:39.91 |
| 1986 | Purchasepaperchase | 4 | Willie Carson | Robert Armstrong | 1:42.16 |
| 1987 | Tahilla | 3 | Pat Eddery | Jeremy Tree | 1:39.54 |
| 1988 | Dabaweyaa | 3 | Walter Swinburn | Michael Stoute | 1:42.63 |
| 1989 | Dimmer | 3 | Michael Roberts | Robert Armstrong | 1:41.65 |
| 1990 | Arpero | 3 | George Duffield | Sir Mark Prescott | 1:42.18 |
| 1991 | Hyabella | 3 | Pat Eddery | Michael Stoute | 1:43.10 |
| 1992 | Amwag | 3 | Michael Roberts | Alec Stewart | 1:43.62 |
| 1993 | Lap of Luxury | 4 | Michael Tebbutt | William Jarvis | 1:41.02 |
| 1994 | Ingozi | 3 | Darryll Holland | Geoff Wragg | 1:42.23 |
| 1995 | Private Line | 3 | Pat Eddery | Henry Cecil | 1:43.81 |
| 1996 | Wandering Star | 3 | Nigel Day | James Fanshawe | 1:41.25 |
| 1997 | One So Wonderful | 3 | Pat Eddery | Luca Cumani | 1:46.80 |
| 1998 | Kissogram | 3 | John Reid | Luca Cumani | 1:42.87 |
| 1999 | Etizaaz | 3 | Frankie Dettori | Saeed bin Suroor | 1:42.19 |
| 2000 | Out of Reach | 3 | Richard Quinn | Barry Hills | 1:42.60 |
| 2001 | Intrepidous | 3 | Brett Doyle | Brian Meehan | 1:43.56 |
| 2002 | Miss Pinkerton | 3 | Darryll Holland | Geoff Wragg | 1:43.22 |
| 2003 | Lady Bear | 5 | Paul Hanagan | Richard Fahey | 1:44.33 |
| 2004 | Zietory | 4 | Frankie Dettori | Paul Cole | 1:47.57 |
| 2005 | Musicanna | 4 | Johnny Murtagh | James Fanshawe | 1:45.93 |
| 2006 | Wasseema | 3 | Richard Hills | Sir Michael Stoute | 1:41.08 |
| 2007 | Sweet Lilly | 3 | Tadhg O'Shea | Mick Channon | 1:41.03 |
| 2008 | Shabiba | 3 | Richard Hills | Marcus Tregoning | 1:41.32 |
| 2009 | Strawberrydaiquiri | 3 | Ryan Moore | Sir Michael Stoute | 1:41.46 |
| 2010 | Seta | 3 | Jean-Pierre Guillambert | Luca Cumani | 1:41.95 |
| 2011 | Theyskens' Theory | 3 | Davy Bonilla | Brian Meehan | 1:45.67 |
| 2012 | Dank | 3 | Richard Hughes | Sir Michael Stoute | 1:41.08 |
| 2013 (dh) | Integral; Ladys First | 3; 4 | Ryan Moore; Tony Hamilton | Sir Michael Stoute; Richard Fahey | 1:39.20 |
| 2014 | Fintry | 3 | Maxime Guyon | André Fabre | 1:43.01 |
| 2015 | Nakuti | 4 | Ben Curtis | Sylvester Kirk | 1:40.62 |
| 2016 | Persuasive | 3 | Robert Havlin | John Gosden | 1:42.74 |
| 2017 | Aljazzi | 4 | Andrea Atzeni | Marco Botti | 1:40.64 |
| 2018 | Veracious | 3 | Ryan Moore | Sir Michael Stoute | 1:43.12 |
| 2019 | Lavender's Blue | 3 | Jim Crowley | Amanda Perrett | 1:42.16 |
| 2020 | Maamora | 4 | William Buick | Simon & Ed Crisford | 1:42.08 |
| 2021 | Saffron Beach | 3 | Hollie Doyle | Jane Chapple-Hyam | 1:42.73 |
| 2022 | Potapova | 4 | Richard Kingscote | Sir Michael Stoute | 1:42.24 |
| 2023 | Heredia | 4 | Sean Levey | Richard Hannon Jr. | 1:44.38 |
| 2024 | Tamfana | 3 | Oisin Murphy | David Menuisier | 1:41.49 |
| 2025 | Lady Of Spain | 4 | Ray Dawson | Roger Varian | 1:44.08 |
| 2026 | Love Dynasty | 5 | Neil Callan | Kevin Ryan | 1:44.50 |

== See also ==
- Horse racing in Great Britain
- List of British flat horse races
