= October Stakes =

Flat horse race in Britain

October Stakes
2026
So Regal	American Gal	Secret History

Previous years
2025
Cajole	Dash Of Azure	Bright Thunder
2024
Sunfall	Queen Of Mougins	Elim
2023
Cell Sa Beela	Breege	Farhh To Shy
2022
Soft Whisper	Queen Aminatu	Romantic Rival
2021
With Thanks	Bounce The Blues	Highfield Princess

2020-2011
2020
Onassis	With Thanks	Helvezia
2019
Di Fede	Miss Celestial	Muchly
2018
Di Fede	Red Starlight	Solar Gold
2017
One Master	Bletchley	Eternally
2016
Eternally	Robanne	Battlement
2015
Pelerin	Pack Together	Alfajer
2014
Al Thakhira	Meeting Waters	Interception
2013
Tantshi	Ghanaian	Maid A Million
2012
Intense Pink	Switcher	Sentaril
2011
Crying Lightening	Elshabakiya	Marvada

2010-2001
2010
Rainfall	Blue Angel	Electric Feel
2009
Golden Stream	Red Dune	Greenisland
2008
Meydan Princess	Medicea Sidera	Francesca D'gorgio
2007
Miss Lucifer	Diamond Diva	Steam Cuisine
2006
Makderah	Highway To Glory	Gloved Hand
2005
Echelon	Attune	Clinet
2004
Badminton	Pearl Grey	Tahirah
2003
Chic	Starbeck	Duty Paid
2002
Secret Garden	Desert Alchemy	Feathers Flying
2001
Toffee Nosed	Indaba	A Touch of Frost

2000-1991
1999
Penang Pearl	Ras Shaikh	Mayaro Bay
1998
Lilli Claire	Equity Princess	Dazilyn Lady
1997
Jafn	Dancing Drop	Blessed Spirit
1996
Fatefully	Scarlet Plume	Parrot Jungle
1995
A La Carte	Autumn Affair	Donna Viola
1994
Sovinista	Mareha	Lap of Luxury
1992
Well Beyond	Jdaayel	Culture Vulture
1991
Chipaya	Umniyatee	Melpomene

1990-1988
1990
Fire The Groom	Samsova	Palace Street
1989
Princess Accord	Elegant Rainbow	Vitality
1988
Jamarj	New Trends	Aim For The Top

The October Stakes is a Listed flat horse race in Great Britain open to mares and fillies aged three years or older. It is run at Ascot over a distance of 7 furlongs (1,408 metres), and it is scheduled to take place each year in October.

Prior to 1994 the race was for three-year-olds only.

== Winners ==
Year	Winner	Age	Jockey	Trainer	Time
1948	Maryland	3	Gordon Richards	Jack Colling	1:46.40
1949	Cassiope	3	Doug Smith	Harvey Leader	1:44.20
1950	Star Twilight	3	Frank Barlow	J C Waugh	1:49.80
1951	Code Militaire	3	Gordon Richards	Norman Bertie	1:53.60
1952	Adjournment	3	Charlie Elliott	Harvey Leader	1:48.40
1953	Periculum	3	Harry Carr	Cecil Boyd-Rochfort	1:51.60
1954	Caol Ila	3	Scobie Breasley	Noel Cannon	1:48.20
1955	Anne Of Orange	3	Doug Smith	Geoffrey Brooke	1:48.12
1956	Traitress	3	Rae Johnstone	Snowy Parker	1:49.83
1957	Martial Air	3	Tommy Gosling	Jeremy Tree	1:48.55
1958	Throne	3	Jack Purtell	Noel Cannon	1:51.30
1959	Whipsnade	3	Lester Piggott	Noel Murless	1:46.08
1960	No Race
1961	Golden Sands	3	Harry Carr	Charlie Elliott	1:44.78
1962	Heiress	3	Jimmy Lindley	Jeremy Tree	1:50.60
1963	No Race
1964	Change Of Heart	3	Stan Clayton	Cecil Boyd-Rochfort	1:45.06
1965	Pugnacity	3	Joe Mercer	Walter Wharton	1:51.01
1966	Petite Marmite	3	Lester Piggott	Ted Lambton	1:47.52
1967	Whirled	3	Lester Piggott	Freddie Maxwell	1:51.01
1968	Abandoned due to waterlogging
1969	Vital Match	3	Jimmy Lindley	Herbert Blagrave	1:44.92
1970	Strong Light	3	Joe Mercer	Derrick Candy	1:49.43
1971	Magic Flute	3	Geoff Lewis	Noel Murless	1:47.43
1972	Relkalim	3	Brian Taylor	Harry Wragg	1:50.17
1973	Katie Cecil	3	Greville Starkey	Henry Cecil	1:49.76
1974	Pass A Glance	3	Joe Mercer	Henry Cecil	1:53.98
1975	Sauceboat	3	Sandy Barclay	Noel Murless	1:43.54
1976	Abandoned due to waterlogging
1977	Noirima	3	Geoff Lewis	Bruce Hobbs	1:46.23
1978	Spring In Deepsea	3	Greville Starkey	Luca Cumani	1:42.60
1979	Eldoret	3	Willie Carson	John Dunlop	1:45.48
1980	Our Home	3	Lester Piggott	Michael Stoute	1:46.00
1981	Slaney Maid	3	Stephen Craine	Liam Browne	1:50.94
1982	Vadrouille	3	Lester Piggott	Henry Cecil	1:49.10
1983	Onaizah	3	Paul Cook	Harry Thomson Jones	1:43.66
1984	Capricorn Belle	3	Lester Piggott	Luca Cumani	1:46.85
1985	English Spring	3	Pat Eddery	Ian Balding	1:41.86
1986	Daring Doone	3	Michael Roberts	Alec Stewart	1:45.90
1987	Nuryana	3	Steve Cauthen	Geoff Wragg	1:50.47
1988	Jamarj	3	Mark Birch	Peter Easterby	1:47.73
1989	Princess Accord	3	Frankie Dettori	Luca Cumani	1:42.80
1990	Fire The Groom	3	Frankie Dettori	Luca Cumani	1:42.11
1991	Chipaya	3	George Duffield	James Fanshawe	1:44.38
1992	Well Beyond	3	Pat Eddery	Barry Hills	1:46.99
1993	Abandoned due to waterlogging
1994	Sovinista	3	Michael Roberts	John Dunlop	1:42.75
1995	A La Carte	3	Richard Quinn	John Dunlop	1:45.45
1996	Fatefully	3	Frankie Dettori	Saeed bin Suroor	1:43.76
1997	Jafn	3	Richard Hills	Ben Hanbury	1:48.10
1998	Lilli Claire	5	Tim Sprake	David Elsworth	1:47.55
1999	Penang Pearl	3	Frankie Dettori	Gerard Butler	1:45.97
2000	Abandoned due to a security alert
2001	Toffee Nosed	3	Darryll Holland	Barry Hills	1:31.10
2002	Secret Garden	3	Jimmy Fortune	John Gosden	1:29.29
2003	Chic	3	Kieren Fallon	Sir Michael Stoute	1:28.91
2004	Badminton	3	Frankie Dettori	Saeed bin Suroor	1:27.96
2005	Echelon	3	Frankie Dettori	Sir Michael Stoute	1:24.39
2006	Makderah	3	Richard Hills	Marcus Tregoning	1:27.42
2007	Miss Lucifer	3	Michael Hills	Barry Hills	1:29.44
2008	Meydan Princess	3	Shane Kelly	Jeremy Noseda	1:27.69
2009	Golden Stream	3	Ryan Moore	Sir Michael Stoute	1:26.36
2010	Rainfall	3	Frankie Dettori	Mark Johnston	1:29.21
2011	Crying Lightening	3	Martin Dwyer	Peter Chapple-Hyam	1:27.61
2012	Intense Pink	3	Seb Sanders	Chris Wall	1:29.51
2013	Tantshi	3	Jamie Spencer	Roger Varian	1:28.94
2014	Al Thakhira	3	Martin Harley	Marco Botti	1:30.41
2015	Pelerin	4	Martin Harley	Marco Botti	1:26.66
2016	Eternally	3	Frankie Dettori	John Gosden	1:28.43
2017	One Master	3	Martin Harley	William Haggas	1:30.77
2018	Di Fede	3	Harry Bentley	Ralph Beckett	1:28.99
2019	Di Fede	4	Silvestre de Sousa	Ralph Beckett	1:29.53
2020 (Note: The 2020 race was run at Goodwood after the original Ascot fixture was abandoned due to waterlogging)	Onassis	3	Hayley Turner	Charlie Fellows	1:32.37
2021	With Thanks	4	Tom Marquand	William Haggas	1:29.15
2022	Soft Whisper	4	David Probert	Saeed bin Suroor	1:30.16
2023	Cell Sa Beela	3	Jim Crowley	Roger Varian	1:28.26
2024	Sunfall	3	Cieren Fallon	William Haggas	1:28.19
2025	Cajole	3	Tyler Heard	John & Thady Gosden	1:32.21
2026	So Regal	3	Billy Loughnane	John & Thady Gosden	1:25.99

== See also ==
- Horse racing in Great Britain
- List of British flat horse races
