= One Master =

British Thoroughbred racehorse

- Sire: Fastnet Rock
- Grandsire: Danehill
- Dam: Enticing
- Damsire: Pivotal
- Sex: Mare
- Foaled: 2014
- Country: United Kingdom
- Color: Bay
- Breeder: Lael Stable
- Owner: Lael Stable
- Trainer: William Haggas
- Record: 23: 7-4-4
- Earnings: £939,644

Major wins
- October Stakes (2017); Fairy Bridge Stakes (2018); Prix de la Forêt (2018, 2019, 2020); Oak Tree Stakes (2020)

One Master (foaled 1 April 2014) is a British Thoroughbred racehorse and broodmare. She did not race until she was a three-year-old when she won two of her three races including the Listed October Stakes. In the following year she was beaten in her first three starts before taking the Group 3 Fairy Bridge Stakes in Ireland and the Group 1 Prix de la Forêt in France. As a five-year-old in 2019 she repeated her victory in the Prix de la Forêt as well as being placed in the Queen Anne Stakes, Falmouth Stakes and British Champions Sprint Stakes. In 2020 she won the Oak Tree Stakes and took the Prix de la Forêt for a record third time.

== Background ==
One Master is a bay mare with no white markings bred in England by Roy and Gretchen Jackson's Pennsylvania-based Lael Stables. During her racing career she carried the green, blue and white colours of Lael Stable and was trained by William Haggas at Newmarket, Suffolk.

Her sire, the Australian stallion Fastnet Rock, was a sprinter whose victories included the Lightning Stakes and the Oakleigh Plate. He sired many leading horses including Shoals and Atlantic Jewel in the Southern hemisphere before moving to the Coolmore Stud in Ireland. His European progeny have included Fascinating Rock and Qualify. One Master's dam Enticing was a top class sprinting mare who won the King George Stakes as a four-year-old in 2008, and was a daughter of the 2000 Cartier Champion Two-year-old Filly Superstar Leo. Superstar Leo was in turn a granddaughter of Dancing Rocks, whose other descendants have included Power and Footstepsinthesand.

== Racing career ==
=== 2017: three-year-old season ===
One Master did not race as a two-year-old, making her racecourse debut on 19 August 2017 when she finished third in a maiden race over six furlongs at Doncaster Racecourse, beaten one and a half lengths by the winner Equitation. In September she was ridden by Ryan Moore when she started the 4/11 favourite for a similar event at Yarmouth Racecourse and recorded her first success as she took the lead a furlong from the finish and pulled away from her seven opponents to win by two and three quarter lengths. Martin Harley took the ride when the filly was stepped up to Listed class for the seven-furlong October Stakes at Ascot Racecourse on 7 October and started a 20/1 outsider in a thirteen-runner field. After being restrained at the rear of the field One Master began to make progress in the last quarter mile, overtook the front-running favourite Eternally a furlong out, and kept on well to win by one and a quarter lengths from Bletchley.

=== 2018: four-year-old season ===
On her first start of 2018 One Master finished fourth after starting favourite for the Group 3 Chartwell Fillies' Stakes over seven furlongs at Lingfield Park on 12 May. In the following month she was sent to Ireland for the Ballyogan Stakes at the Curragh but was again the beaten favourite, taking third place behind Actress and Gorane. On 3 August at Goodwood Racecourse she was beaten again as she finished fourth behind the three-year-old Pretty Baby in the Oak Tree Stakes. At the end of the month the filly returned to Ireland for the Fairy Bridge Stakes over seven and a half furlongs at Tipperary Racecourse and started the 9/2 second favourite behind the Aidan O'Brien-trained I Can Fly. Ridden by Colm O'Donoghue she recorded her first win of the year as she produced a strong late run to take the lead in the closing stages and won by half a length from Dan's Dream. After the race O'Donoghue said "I spoke to James Doyle and Ryan Moore and they were very complimentary of the filly. They said to ride her cold as she’d finish off the race good and ground and trip wasn’t a problem. She hit the line strong".

On 7 October One Master was ridden by Pierre-Charles Boudot when she started a 33/1 outsider for the Group 1 Prix de la Forêt over 1400 metres at Longchamp Racecourse. The Prix Maurice de Gheest winner Polydream started favourite, while the other thirteen runners included Teppal, Gustav Klimt (Superlative Stakes), Sir Dancealot (Lennox Stakes), Inns of Court (Prix du Gros Chêne) and James Garfield (Mill Reef Stakes). After being restrained towards the rear of the field, One Master produced a sustained run on the outside in the last 400 metres and caught the leader Inns of Court on the line to win by a short head, with Dutch Connection a head away in third. After the race William Haggas said "Pierre-Charles had to get her settled, which he did beautifully, and she picked up well. She's a lovely filly that wants soft ground... She's tough... Her owners have been fantastic... They send me everything they breed, and I'm absolutely thrilled. I trained this filly's mother and grandmother".

One Master had two more races in 2018. In November she was sent to the United States to contest the Breeders' Cup Mile at Churchill Downs and finished fifth to Expert Eye, a length behind the winner after staying on well in the closing stages. In December she ended her campaign in the Hong Kong Mile at Sha Tin Racecourse, coming home eighth of the fourteen runners behind Beauty Generation.

=== 2019: five-year-old season ===
One Master began her 2019 campaign by running fourth behind Beshaayir in the Lanwades Stud Stakes at the Curragh on 25 May. Starting a 20/1 outsider for the Queen Anne Stakes at Royal Ascot in June she took the lead a furlong out but was overtaken in the closing stages and came home third behind Lord Glitters and Beat The Bank. In the Falmouth Stakes at Newmarket Racecourse on 12 July she produced a sustained run from the rear of the field but failed by a neck to overhaul the Michael Stoute-trained four-year-old Veracious. She was dropped back in distance for the Prix Maurice de Gheest over 1300 metres at Deauville Racecourse in August and came home fifth behind the three-year-old Advertise.

On 6 October One Master attempted to repeat her 2018 victory in the Prix de la Forêt and started the 3.4/1 second choice in the betting behind the five-year-old City Light, the winner of the Prix de Saint-Georges and the Prix du Pin. The other contenders included Sir Dancealot, Glorious Journey (Hungerford Stakes), Safe Journey (John of Gaunt Stakes), Waldpfad (Hackwood Stakes) and Hey Gaman (Prix du Palais-Royal). Ridden by Boudot, she settled towards the rear of the twelve runner field before edging left to the outside to make her challenge in the straight. She gained the advantage entering the last 200 metres and held off the sustained challenge of City Light to win by half a length with the pair finishing three and a half lengths clear of Speak In Colours in third place. Haggas commented "She's been a fantastic filly who runs well every time. She's lightly raced because there are very few races she can run in. She may stay in training. The owners keep telling me they're too old to breed horses so would like the fun... She has a particular trip. This is the only Group 1 over seven furlongs, and she's managed to win it twice. She needs softer ground, so she will go to Ascot for the British Champions Sprint Stakes in two weeks' time, and that will be it for the season".

As Haggas predicted, One Master ended her season in the British Champions Sprint Stakes on 19 October and started the 4/1 joint-favourite alongside Advertise. She produced a sustained late run after being denied a clear run approaching the final furlong but failed by a length to overhaul the 33/1 outsider Donjuan Triumphant.

=== 2020: six-year-old season ===
The 2020 flat racing season in Britain was disrupted by the COVID-19 pandemic and One Master did not return to the track until 20 June when she contested the Diamond Jubilee Stakes, run behind closed doors at Royal Ascot, and finished sixth, beaten three and a half lengths by the winner Hello Youmzain. Three weeks later she ran for the second time in the Falmouth Stakes and finished a close fourth behind Nazeef, Billesdon Brook and Terrebellum, running on strongly after being denied a clear run a furlong from the finish. On 31 July at Goodwood, One Master was dropped back to Group 3 class for the Oak Tree Stakes on good to firm ground and started the 6/4 favourite, with the best of her eleven opponents appearing to be Althiqa (Prix Amandine) and Breathtaking Look (Sceptre Stakes). Ridden for the first time by Tom Marquand, she had considerable trouble in running before squeezing through on the inside, catching the Irish three-year-old Valeria Messalina on the line and winning by a short head. Haggas said "I told Tom to stay on the inside and not worry about it and if he got out fantastic and if he didn't at least she wouldn't have a hard race. Thankfully, she managed to get out in the nick of time. I won't run her on fast ground again - she doesn't deserve that. She's been with us a long time and has basically kept her form because we've looked after her."

At York Racecourse in August One Master started 13/8 favourite for the Group 2 City of York Stakes but was beaten into second place by the seven-year-old gelding Safe Voyage. In the Park Stakes at Doncaster Racecourse in September the mare finished second again, beaten a short-head by Wichita, a three-year-old colt from the Aidan O'Brien stable who had finished second in the 2000 Guineas. On 4 October, with Boudot in the saddle, One Master attempted to become the first horse to win the Prix de la Foret for a third time and started the 2.9/1 second favourite behind Earthlight. The other seven runners were Safe Voyage, Tropbeau (Prix du Calvados), Spinning Memories (Prix du Palais-Royal), Rubaiyat (Gran Criterium), Pretreville (Prix Bertrand du Breuil), Irska (Prix de Lieurey) and Toro Strike. Racing on her favoured heavy ground, One Master settled in mid-division before making a forward move in the straight. She overhauled the leader Earthlight inside the last 100 metres and won by a neck, with the fast-finishing Safe Voyage a short-head away in third place. After the race Haggas commented "We're really proud of her. She's a fantastic filly and she seems to come good over this track and trip. She's particularly good on soft ground and was given another brilliant ride by Pierre-Charles. She wants to win... if you look after them when they're young, they'll look after you when they're older." Boudot said "I love her. When I asked her, she was very strong in the last furlong".

On 17 October One Master made her second attempt to win the British Champions Sprint Stakes on 17 October and finished a close third behind Glen Shiel and Brando after staying on strongly in the closing stages. She was then sent to the United States to contest the Breeders' Cup Mile but was withdrawn from the race after being found to have "raised muscle enzymes".

On 18 November it was announced that One Master had been retired from racing. Haggas commented "One Master has been an absolute star for us. She was kept in training specifically to win the Foret for a third time and it came off, which seldom happens."

== Breeding record ==
After her retirement from racing One Master became a broodmare at the New England Stud in Newmarket. She was scheduled to be covered by Dubawi in 2021.

== Pedigree ==
Pedigree of One Master (GB), bay mare, 2014
Sire Fastnet Rock (AUS) 2001	Danehill (USA); 1986	Danzig	Northern Dancer (CAN)
Sire Fastnet Rock (AUS) 2001	Danehill (USA); 1986	Danzig	Pas de Nom
Sire Fastnet Rock (AUS) 2001	Danehill (USA); 1986	Razyana	His Majesty
Sire Fastnet Rock (AUS) 2001	Danehill (USA); 1986	Razyana	Spring Adieu (CAN)
Sire Fastnet Rock (AUS) 2001	Piccadilly Circus (AUS); 1995	Royal Academy (USA)	Nijinsky (CAN)
Sire Fastnet Rock (AUS) 2001	Piccadilly Circus (AUS); 1995	Royal Academy (USA)	Crimson Saint
Sire Fastnet Rock (AUS) 2001	Piccadilly Circus (AUS); 1995	Gatana	Marauding (NZ)
Sire Fastnet Rock (AUS) 2001	Piccadilly Circus (AUS); 1995	Gatana	Twigalae
Dam Enticing (IRE) 2004	Pivotal (GB); 1984	Polar Falcon (USA)	Nureyev
Dam Enticing (IRE) 2004	Pivotal (GB); 1984	Polar Falcon (USA)	Marie d'Argonne (FR)
Dam Enticing (IRE) 2004	Pivotal (GB); 1984	Fearless Revival	Cozzene (USA)
Dam Enticing (IRE) 2004	Pivotal (GB); 1984	Fearless Revival	Stufida
Dam Enticing (IRE) 2004	Superstar Leo (IRE); 1998	College Chapel (GB)	Sharpo
Dam Enticing (IRE) 2004	Superstar Leo (IRE); 1998	College Chapel (GB)	Scarcely Blessed (IRE)
Dam Enticing (IRE) 2004	Superstar Leo (IRE); 1998	Council Rock (GB)	General Assembly (USA)
Dam Enticing (IRE) 2004	Superstar Leo (IRE); 1998	Council Rock (GB)	Dancing Rocks (Family: 1-e)
