= Dick Hern Fillies' Stakes =

Flat horse race in Britain

- Class: Listed
- Location: Haydock Park; Haydock, England
- Race type: Flat / Thoroughbred
- Sponsor: Irish Stallion Farms
- Website: Haydock Park

Race information
- Distance: 1m 37y (1,643m)
- Surface: Turf
- Track: Left-handed
- Qualification: Three-years-old and up fillies & mares exc. G1 or G2 winners after 2024
- Weight: 8 st 11 lb (3yo); 9 st 4 lb (4yo+); Penalties; 5 lb for Group 3 winners * 3 lb for Listed winners * * after 2024
- Purse: £65,000 (2025); 1st: £36,862

Dick Hern Fillies' Stakes
2026
Calendar Girl	Pacific Mission	Fallen Angel

Previous years
2025
Suite Francaise	Never Let Go	Shuwari
2024
Choisya	Indelible	Naomi Lapaglia
2023
Heredia	Purplepay	Orchid Bloom
2022
Rising Star	Random Harvest	Crenelle
2021
Waliyak	Passionova	Illykato

2020-2011
2020
Veracious	Posted	Farzeen
2019
Miss O Connor	Red Starlight	Feliciana De Vega
2018
Unforgetable Filly	New Day Dawn	Queen of Time
2017
Sea Of Grace	Lincoln Rocks	Dancing Breeze
2016
Aljazzi	Mix And Mingle	Pirouette
2015
Realtra	Wiener Valkyrie	Crowley's Law
2014
Token Of Love	Lady Lara	Manderley
2013
Amazonas	Reyaadah	Ultrasonic
2012
Ladys First	Dank	Moone's My Name
2011
Crystal Gal	Off Chance	Heavenly Dawn

2010-2001
2010
Sajjhaa	Kinky Afro	Forest Crown
2009
Annabelle's Charm	Please Sing	Golden Stream
2008
Lady Deauville	Eva's Request	Perfect Star
2007
Pintle	Sesmen	Wagtail
2006
Three Wrens	Sweet Treat	Sabah
2005
Summitville	Discuss	Clinet
2004
Brindisi	Moon Dazzle	Zietory
2003
Londonnetdotcom	Sheppard's Watch	Tadris
2002
Alasha	Mamounia	Ryme Intrinseca
2001
Duck Row	Blue Mountain	Welsh Wind

2000-1999
2000
Full Flow	Brilliant Red	Pulau Tioman
1999
Bathwick	Sir Effendi	Green Card

The Dick Hern Fillies' Stakes is a Listed flat horse race in Great Britain open to fillies and mares aged three years or older. It is run at Haydock Park over a distance of 1 mile and 37 yards (1,643 metres), and it is scheduled to take place each year in August.

The race is named after Dick Hern (1921–2002), an English racehorse trainer. The race was first run in 1999 and was awarded Listed status in 2002. Prior to 2011 it was run at Bath Racecourse.

== Records ==
Most successful horse:

- no horse has won this race more than once

Leading jockey (3 wins):

- Jamie Spencer – Full Flow (2000), Alasha (2002), Annabelle's Charm (2009)
- Andrea Atzeni Aljazzi (2016), Sea Of Grace (2017), Rising Star (2022)

Leading trainer (3 wins):

- William Haggas – Token Of Love (2014), Sea Of Grace (2017), Miss O Connor (2019)

== Winners ==
Year	Winner	Age	Jockey	Trainer	Time
1999	Bathwick	3	J Stack	Bryan Smart	1:38.70
2000	Full Flow	3	Jamie Spencer	Barry Hills	1:39.20
2001	Duck Row	6	Simon Whitworth	James Toller	1:39.80
2002	Alasha	3	Jamie Spencer	Michael Stoute	1:37.40
2003	Londonnetdotcom	3	Steve Drowne	Mick Channon	1:38.44
2004	Brindisi	3	Michael Hills	Barry Hills	1:39.33
2005	Summitville	5	Jimmy Fortune	John Given	1:37.98
2006	Three Wrens	4	Nicky Mackay	Declan Daly	1:39.81
2007	Pintle	7	Kerrin McEvoy	John Spearing	1:42.96
2008	Lady Deauville	3	Franny Norton	Paul Blockley	1:43.16
2009	Annabelle's Charm	4	Jamie Spencer	Luca Cumani	1:39.60
2010	Sajjhaa	3	Philip Robinson	Michael Jarvis	1:38.75
2011	Crystal Gal	4	Dane O'Neill	Lucy Wadham	1:43.66
2012	Ladys First	3	Barry McHugh	Richard Fahey	1:41.94
2013	Amazonas	3	Pat Smullen	Ed Dunlop	1:44.09
2014	Token of Love	3	Joe Fanning	William Haggas	1:41.36
2015	Realtra	3	Jack Mitchell	Roger Varian	1:41.23
2016	Aljazzi	3	Andrea Atzeni	Marco Botti	1:40.12
2017	Sea Of Grace	3	Andrea Atzeni	William Haggas	1:45.72
2018	Unforgetable Filly	4	Ben Curtis	Hugo Palmer	1:38.61
2019	Miss O Connor	4	Oisin Murphy	William Haggas	1:46.36
2020	Veracious	5	Ryan Moore	Sir Michael Stoute	1:39.40
2021	Waliyak	4	Jack Mitchell	Roger Varian	1:47.35
2022	Rising Star	4	Andrea Atzeni	Marco Botti	1:46.07
2023	Heredia	4	Sean Levey	Richard Hannon Jr.	1:42.78
2024	Choisya	4	Harry Davies	Simon & Ed Crisford	1:39.35
2025	Suite Francaise	3	Joe Fanning	Charlie Johnston	1:42.12
2026	Calendar Girl	3	Callum Rodriguez	Owen Burrows	1:37.52

== See also ==
- Horse racing in Great Britain
- List of British flat horse races
