= Oak Tree Stakes =

Flat horse race in Britain

- Class: Group 3
- Location: Goodwood Racecourse; W. Sussex, England
- Inaugurated: 1980
- Race type: Flat / Thoroughbred
- Website: Goodwood

Race information
- Distance: 7f (1,408 metres)
- Surface: Turf
- Track: Right-handed
- Qualification: Three-years-old and up fillies & mares
- Weight: 8 st 13 lb (3yo); 9 st 6 lb (4yo+); Penalties; 7 lb for Group 1 winners * 5 lb for Group 2 winners * 3 lb for Group 3 winners * * after 2024
- Purse: £100,000 (2025); 1st: £56,710

Oak Tree Stakes
2026
Flora Of Bermuda	Sayidah Dariyan	Radiant Beauty

Previous years
2025
Tabiti	Saqqara Sands	Bright Thunder
2024
Raqiya	Jabaara	Ziggy's Dream
2023
Magical Sunset	Breege	Dream Of Love
2022
Oscula	Internationalangel	Samahram
2021
Last Empire	Onassis	Highfield Princess

2020-2011
2020
One Master	Valeria Messalina	Althiqa
2019
Billesdon Brook	Perfection	Jubiloso
2018
Pretty Baby	Dancing Star	Indian Blessing
2017
Al Jazi	Eternally	Tomyris
2016
Al Jazi	Mise En Rose	Namhroodah
2015
Amy Eria	Osaila	Montalcino
2014
J Wonder	Muteela	Indignant
2013
Annecdote	Winning Express	Instance
2012
Regal Realm	Sunday Nectar	Appealing
2011
Chachamaidee	Dever Dream	Law Of The Range

2010-2001
2010
Tropical Paradise	Golden Stream	Pyrrha
2009
Summer Fete	Select	Please Sing
2008
Visit	Cheyenne Star	Shabiba
2007
Wake Up Maggie	Costume	Redstone Dancer
2006
Red Evie	Makderah	Cantabria
2005
Majestic Desert	Quickfire	Lucky Spin
2004
Phantom Wind	Nyramba	Chic
2003
Tantina	Gonfilia	Tora Bora
2002
Desert Alchemy	Roundtree	Mauri Moon
2001
Mauri Moon	Sheppard's Watch	Independence

2000-1991
2000
Danceabout	Claranet	Last Resort
1999
Selfish	Wannabe Grand	Fragrant Oasis
1998
Beraysim	Ashraakat	Igreja
1997
Dazzle	Unconditional Love	Miss Riviera
1996
Thrilling Day	Forest Cat	Tamnia
1995
Brief Glimpse	Cheyenne Spirit	Epagris
1994
Blue Siren	Elrafa Ah	Monaassabaat
1993
Moon Over Miami	Arjuzah	Abbey's Gal
1992
Storm Dove	Susurration	Mrs Fisher
1991
Himiko	Satin Flower	Only Yours

1990-1988
1990
Alidiva	Filia Ardross	Sally Rous
1989
Kerita	Triode	Sure Gold
1988
Ohsomellow	Thaidah	Aim For The Top

The Oak Tree Stakes is a Group 3 flat horse race in Great Britain open to fillies and mares aged three years or older. It is run at Goodwood over a distance of seven furlongs (1,408 metres), and it is scheduled to take place each year in late July or early August.

== History ==
The event was established in 1980, and it was initially called the New Stand Stakes. The inaugural running was the first race at that year's Glorious Goodwood meeting, and it commemorated the opening of a new grandstand at the venue by Queen Elizabeth II.

The race was titled the Royal Wedding Day Stakes in 1981, as it took place on the same day as the wedding of Prince Charles and Diana.

The present registered title, which acknowledges the link between Goodwood and the Oak Tree Racing Association of California, was introduced in 1982. An event called the Goodwood Stakes was staged during the Oak Tree meeting at Santa Anita Park in October but was renamed the Awesome Again Stakes in 2012. The Goodwood race was sponsored by L'Omarins from 2014 to 2018 and named the L'Ormarins Queen's Plate to link the race with the South African race of that name.

For a period the Oak Tree Stakes was classed at Listed level. It was promoted to Group 3 status in 2004.

The race is currently held on the second day of the five-day Glorious Goodwood meeting.

== Records ==
Most successful horse (2 wins):

- Al Jazi - 2016, 2017

Leading jockey (4 wins):

- Steve Cauthen – Fenny Rough (1983), Ever Genial (1985), Gayane (1987), Alidiva (1990)

Leading trainer (6 wins):

- Sir Henry Cecil – Chalon (1982), Ever Genial (1985), Gayane (1987), Alidiva (1990), Selfish (1999), Chachamaidee (2011)

== Winners ==
Year	Winner	Age	Jockey	Trainer	Time
1980	Trevita	3	Paul Cook	Harry Thomson Jones	1:28.07
1981	Star Pastures	3	Brian Taylor	Jeremy Hindley	1:28.79
1982	Chalon	3	Lester Piggott	Henry Cecil	1:28.24
1983	Fenny Rough	3	Steve Cauthen	Barry Hills	1:27.99
1984	Brocade	3	Greville Starkey	Guy Harwood	1:27.90
1985	Ever Genial	3	Steve Cauthen	Henry Cecil	1:30.71
1986	Royal Loft	3	Ray Cochrane	William Jarvis	1:28.51
1987	Gayane	3	Steve Cauthen	Henry Cecil	1:26.77
1988	Ohsomellow	3	Ray Cochrane	Luca Cumani	1:30.35
1989	Kerita	3	Pat Eddery	Fulke Johnson Houghton	1:27.90
1990	Alidiva	3	Steve Cauthen	Henry Cecil	1:25.60
1991	Himiko	3	Michael Hills	Barry Hills	1:27.51
1992	Storm Dove	3	Paul Eddery	Roger Charlton	1:25.67
1993	Moon Over Miami	3	John Reid	Charlie James	1:30.24
1994	Blue Siren	3	Michael Hills	Ian Balding	1:26.45
1995	Brief Glimpse	3	Michael Hills	David Chappell	1:23.88
1996	Thrilling Day	3	David Harrison	Neil Graham	1:26.07
1997	Dazzle	3	John Reid	Michael Stoute	1:27.63
1998	Beraysim	3	Frankie Dettori	Michael Jarvis	1:27.46
1999	Selfish	5	Kieren Fallon	Henry Cecil	1:24.41
2000	Danceabout	3	Kevin Darley	Geoff Wragg	1:27.62
2001	Mauri Moon	3	Darryll Holland	Geoff Wragg	1:26.13
2002	Desert Alchemy	3	Seb Sanders	Amanda Perrett	1:25.25
2003	Tantina	3	Richard Hughes	Barry Hills	1:26.82
2004	Phantom Wind	3	Steve Drowne	John Gosden	1:26.10
2005	Majestic Desert	4	Ted Durcan	Mick Channon	1:27.25
2006	Red Evie	3	Frankie Dettori	Michael Bell	1:24.94
2007	Wake Up Maggie	4	George Baker	Chris Wall	1:25.48
2008	Visit	4	Ryan Moore	Sir Michael Stoute	1:26.02
2009	Summer Fete	3	Richard Mullen	Bryan Smart	1:26.08
2010	Tropical Paradise	4	Ian Mongan	Peter Winkworth	1:25.60
2011	Chachamaidee	4	Tom Queally	Sir Henry Cecil	1:25.10
2012	Regal Realm	3	Ryan Moore	Jeremy Noseda	1:26.50
2013	Annecdote	3	Richard Kingscote	Jonathan Portman	1:25.33
2014	J Wonder	3	Jimmy Fortune	Brian Meehan	1:25.09
2015	Amy Eria	4	Grégory Benoist	François Rohaut	1:24.38
2016	Al Jazi	3	Grégory Benoist	François Rohaut	1:24.92
2017	Al Jazi	4	Frankie Dettori	François Rohaut	1:29.29
2018	Pretty Baby	3	Dane O'Neill	William Haggas	1:25.42
2019	Billesdon Brook	4	Sean Levey	Richard Hannon Jr.	1:23.75
2020	One Master	6	Tom Marquand	William Haggas	1:25.80
2021	Last Empire	5	Daniel Tudhope	Kevin Ryan	1:30.77
2022	Oscula	3	William Buick	George Boughey	1:25.64
2023	Magical Sunset	3	Kevin Stott	Richard Hannon Jr.	1:33.18
2024	Raqiya	3	Jim Crowley	Owen Burrows	1:24.81
2025 (dh)	Saqqara Sands; Tabiti	3; 3	Rossa Ryan; Ryan Moore	Ralph Beckett; Ralph Beckett	1:25.02
2026	Flora Of Bermuda	5	James Doyle	Andrew Balding	1:25.59

== See also ==
- Horse racing in Great Britain
- List of British flat horse races
