= Queen Charlotte Fillies' Stakes =

Flat horse race in Britain

- Class: Listed
- Location: Chelmsford City Racecourse; Great Leighs, England
- Race type: Flat / Thoroughbred
- Sponsor: Louis Roederer
- Website: Chelmsford City

Race information
- Distance: 7f (1,408 metres)
- Surface: Polytrack
- Track: Left-handed
- Qualification: Four-years-old and up fillies and mares
- Weight: 9 st 0 lb Penalties; 7 lb for Group 1 /2 winners* 5 lb for Group 3 winners * 3 lb for Listed winners * * since 31 August 2021
- Purse: £100,000 (2024); 1st: £44,560

Queen Charlotte Fillies' Stakes
2025
| Cloud Cover | Fair Point | Stop The Cavalry |

Previous years
2024
Vetiver | Cloud Cover | Zenga
2023
White Moonlight | Queen Aminatu | Hodd's Girl
2022
Soft Whisper | Bounce The Blues | Improvised
2021
Highfield Princess | Double Or Bubble | Shimmering Dawn

2020-2018
2020
Miss Celestial | Billesdon Brook | Farzeen
2019
Billesdon Brook | Crossing The Line | Solar Gold
2018
Carolinae | Belle Boyd | Marie Of Lyon

The Queen Charlotte Fillies' Stakes is a Listed flat horse race in Great Britain open to fillies and mares aged four years or older. It is run over a distance of 7 furlongs (1,408 metres) at Chelmsford City in June.

The race was created as a new Listed race in 2018 and is the highest-graded race belonging to Chelmsford City. The title commemorates the Queen Charlotte Stakes, a historic race that took place at Chelmsford Racecourse during the 18th and 19th centuries. The new race required royal approval for the title, which carries the name of Queen Charlotte, the consort of George III.

== Winners ==
| Year | Winner | Age | Jockey | Trainer | Time |
|---|---|---|---|---|---|
| 2018 | Carolinae | 6 | Stephen Donohoe | Charlie Fellowes | 1:23.63 |
| 2019 | Billesdon Brook | 4 | Sean Levey | Richard Hannon Jr. | 1:23.81 |
| 2020 (Note: The 2020 race was run in July due to the COVID-19 pandemic in the United Kingdom) | Miss Celestial | 4 | Luke Morris | Mark Prescott | 1:22.56 |
| 2021 | Highfield Princess | 4 | Jason Hart | John Quinn | 1:22.69 |
| 2022 | Soft Whisper | 4 | Marco Ghiani | Saeed bin Suroor | 1:24.51 |
| 2023 | White Moonlight | 6 | Kieran Shoemark | Saeed bin Suroor | 1:23.45 |
| 2024 | Vetiver | 4 | David Probert | Andrew Balding | 1:22.95 |
| 2025 | Cloud Cover | 5 | Clifford Lee | James Tate | 1:23.50 |
| 2026 (Note: The 2026 race was run at Chester) | Bellarchi | 5 | Joanna Mason | Grant Tuer | 1:24.39 |

== See also ==
- Horse racing in Great Britain
- List of British flat horse races
