= The Revenant (horse) =

British-bred Thoroughbred racehorse

- Sire: Dubawi
- Grandsire: Dubai Millennium
- Dam: Hazel Lavery
- Damsire: Excellent Art
- Sex: Gelding
- Foaled: 20 April 2015
- Country: United Kingdom
- Colour: Chestnut
- Breeder: Al Asayl Bloodstock
- Owner: Al Asayl France
- Trainer: Hugo Palmer; Francis-Henri Graffard
- Record: 19: 12-3-2
- Earnings: £1,092,418

Major wins
- Prix Altipan (2019); Prix Edmond Blanc (2019, 2022); Badener Meile (2019); Prix Daniel Wildenstein (2019, 2020); Queen Elizabeth II Stakes (2020)

The Revenant (foaled 20 April 2015) is a British-bred, French-trained Thoroughbred racehorse who specialises in races over 1600 metres or one mile and excels on soft or heavy ground. He was initially trained in England before moving to France in 2018 where he won three of his four races. In the following year he was gelded and improved significantly, winning the Prix Altipan, Prix Edmond Blanc, Badener Meile and Prix Daniel Wildenstein. In 2020 he repeated his victory in the Prix Daniel Wildenstein before recording his biggest win in the Queen Elizabeth II Stakes.

== Background ==
The Revenant is a chestnut horse with no white markings bred in England by his owner Sheikha Alyazia bint Sultan Al Nahyan's Al Asayl Bloodstock. He was initially sent into training with Hugo Palmer at Newmarket, Suffolk.

He was from the ninth crop of foals sired by Dubawi, whose wins included the Irish 2,000 Guineas and the Prix Jacques Le Marois. At stud, Dubawi has been a highly successful breeding stallion, siring major winners such as Ghaiyyath, Monterosso, Al Kazeem, Makfi, Old Persian, Lucky Nine and Night of Thunder. The Revenant's dam Hazel Lavery was a high-class staying racemare who won three of her nine races including the Group 3 St Simon Stakes in 2012. She was a great-great-granddaughter of the British broodmare Dawn Echo, a half-sister to Boldboy and a more distant female-line descendant of Singapore's Sister, a full-sister to the St Leger winner Singapore.

== Racing career ==
=== 2017 and 2018: early career ===
The Revenant began his racing career in a novice race (for two-year-old horses for no more than two previous wins) over one mile at Haydock Park on 7 September in which he started at odds of 11/2 and recovered from a poor start to win by three quarters of a length from Global Conqueror and nine others. On 1 October at Epsom Downs Racecourse he started favourite for a minor event over eight and a half furlongs and finished third behind Dee Ex Bee and Move Over.

In 2018 The Revenant was transferred to the French stable of Francis-Henri Graffard at Chantilly. On 23 September he made his French debut in a minor race over 1700 metres at La Roche Posay Racecourse, Vienne, and won by three lengths. In this race he wore a hood for the first time and was equipped with headgear in most of his subsequent races. He then finished second to Aviateur over 1600 metres at Compiègne on 15 October before winning over the same distance at Marseille two weeks later. He was ridden in both races by Pierre-Charles Boudot who became his regular jockey and who was again in the saddle when The Reveneant ended his season with a victory in the Prix Gay Mecene on very soft ground at Saint-Cloud Racecourse in November.

=== 2019: four-year-old season ===
Before the start of the 2019 season The Revenant was gelded, making him ineligible to compete in France's two biggest mile races, the Prix Jacques Le Marois and the Prix du Moulin. He began his campaign with a step up in class for the Listed Prix Altipan over 1600 metres on heavy ground at Saint-Cloud on 10 March when he started the 2.4/1 favourite and won by two and a half lengths from the five-year-old mare Qualisaga after taking the lead 200 metres from the finish. Twenty days later, over the same course and distance, he was moved up to Group 3 level for the Prix Edmond Blanc and started the 3/1 third favourite behind Graphite (winner of the Prix Quincey) and Olmedo (Poule d'Essai des Poulains). Ridden by Olivier Peslier he raced towards the rear before finishing strongly to take the lead in the final strides and won by a head from Graphite and Lunch Lady.

In May The Revenant was sent to Germany to contest the Group 2 Badener Meile at Baden-Baden in which he was ridden by Ronan Thomas and went off the 2.2/1 second choice in the betting behind the Irish challenger Imaging (Gladness Stakes). After being restrained towards the back of the nine-runner field he produced a strong late run, overhauled the favourite in the last 100 metres and won by half a length.

After a break of over four months The Revenant returned on 5 October for the Group 2 Prix Daniel Wildenstein over 1600 metres on very soft ground at Longchamp Racecourse and went off the 3.2/1 fourth choice behind Olmedo, Impulsif (Prix Messidor) and Shaman (Prix La Force) in a five-runner field. He tracked the leaders before going to the front approaching the last 200 meters and drew away to win "readily" by four and a half lengths. Ten days later The Revenant made his first appearance in his native England for more than three years when he contested the Group 1 Queen Elizabeth Stakes at Ascot Racecourse and finished second of the sixteen runners, one and a quarter lengths behind the winner King of Change, after being denied a clear run inside the final furlong.

In the 2019 World's Best Racehorse Rankings The Revenant was rated on 119, making him the 57th-best racehorse in the world.

=== 2020: five-year-old season ===
The 2020 flat racing season in Europe was disrupted by the COVID-19 pandemic: most of the major spring races were either cancelled or rescheduled and subsequent events were held behind closed doors. The Revenant was reserved for an autumn campaign and did not make his seasonal debut until 3 October when he attempted to repeat his 2019 success in the Prix Daniel Wildenstein and started the 0.7/1 favourite against six opponents. He was restrained towards the rear of the field by Boudot before gaining the advantage 200 metres out and winning by one and three quarter lengths from the three-year-old Ziegfeld.

As in the previous year, The Revenant attempted to follow up his success at Longchamp in the Queen Elizabeth II Stakes on 17 October. He started the 5/1 second favourite behind Palace Pier in a fourteen-runner field which also included Circus Maximus, Nazeef, Lord Glitters, Veracious, Century Dream (Celebration Mile) and Molatham (Jersey Stakes). He was in contention from the start, moved up to challenge for the lead in the last quarter mile and got the better of a sustained struggle with the front-running outsider Roseman to win by a head. After the race Graffard said "it was a magnificent performance, the horse was brilliant... This has been the plan ever since he was second last year, and everything was geared around coming back. I had him ready to run in the spring, but when lockdown came I decided to send him out to grass and he had a good spell", while Boudot commented "Today I was very confident with his trainer, and the horse did it well on the track. He loved the ground and the trip has been perfect... and when I asked him, he gave me a nice and long turn of foot. He has been courageous in the last furlong."

In the 2020 World's Best Racehorse Rankings, The Revenant was rated on 119, making him the equal 57th best racehorse in the world.

== Pedigree ==
Pedigree of The Revenant (GB), chestnut gelding, 2015
Sire Dubawi (IRE) 2002	Dubai Millennium (GB); 1996	Seeking The Gold (USA)	Mr. Prospector
Sire Dubawi (IRE) 2002	Dubai Millennium (GB); 1996	Seeking The Gold (USA)	Con Game
Sire Dubawi (IRE) 2002	Dubai Millennium (GB); 1996	Colorado Dancer (IRE)	Shareef Dancer (USA)
Sire Dubawi (IRE) 2002	Dubai Millennium (GB); 1996	Colorado Dancer (IRE)	Fall Aspen (USA)
Sire Dubawi (IRE) 2002	Zomaradah (GB); 1995	Deploy	Shirley Heights
Sire Dubawi (IRE) 2002	Zomaradah (GB); 1995	Deploy	Slightly Dangerous (USA)
Sire Dubawi (IRE) 2002	Zomaradah (GB); 1995	Jawaher (IRE)	Dancing Brave (USA)
Sire Dubawi (IRE) 2002	Zomaradah (GB); 1995	Jawaher (IRE)	High Tern
Dam Hazel Lavery (IRE) 2009	Excellent Art (GB); 2004	Pivotal	Polar Falcon (USA)
Dam Hazel Lavery (IRE) 2009	Excellent Art (GB); 2004	Pivotal	Fearless Revival
Dam Hazel Lavery (IRE) 2009	Excellent Art (GB); 2004	Obsessive (USA)	Seeking The Gold
Dam Hazel Lavery (IRE) 2009	Excellent Art (GB); 2004	Obsessive (USA)	Secret Obsession
Dam Hazel Lavery (IRE) 2009	Reprise (GB); 2000	Darshaan	Shirley Heights
Dam Hazel Lavery (IRE) 2009	Reprise (GB); 2000	Darshaan	Delsy (FR)
Dam Hazel Lavery (IRE) 2009	Reprise (GB); 2000	Rapid Repeat (IRE)	Exactly Sharp (USA)
Dam Hazel Lavery (IRE) 2009	Reprise (GB); 2000	Rapid Repeat (IRE)	Silver Echo (Family: 8-c)

- The Revenant is inbred 3 × 4 to Seeking The Gold, meaning that this stallion appears in both the third and fourth generations of his pedigree. He is also inbred 4 × 4 to Shirley Heights.
