= Prix Edmond Blanc =

Flat horse race in France

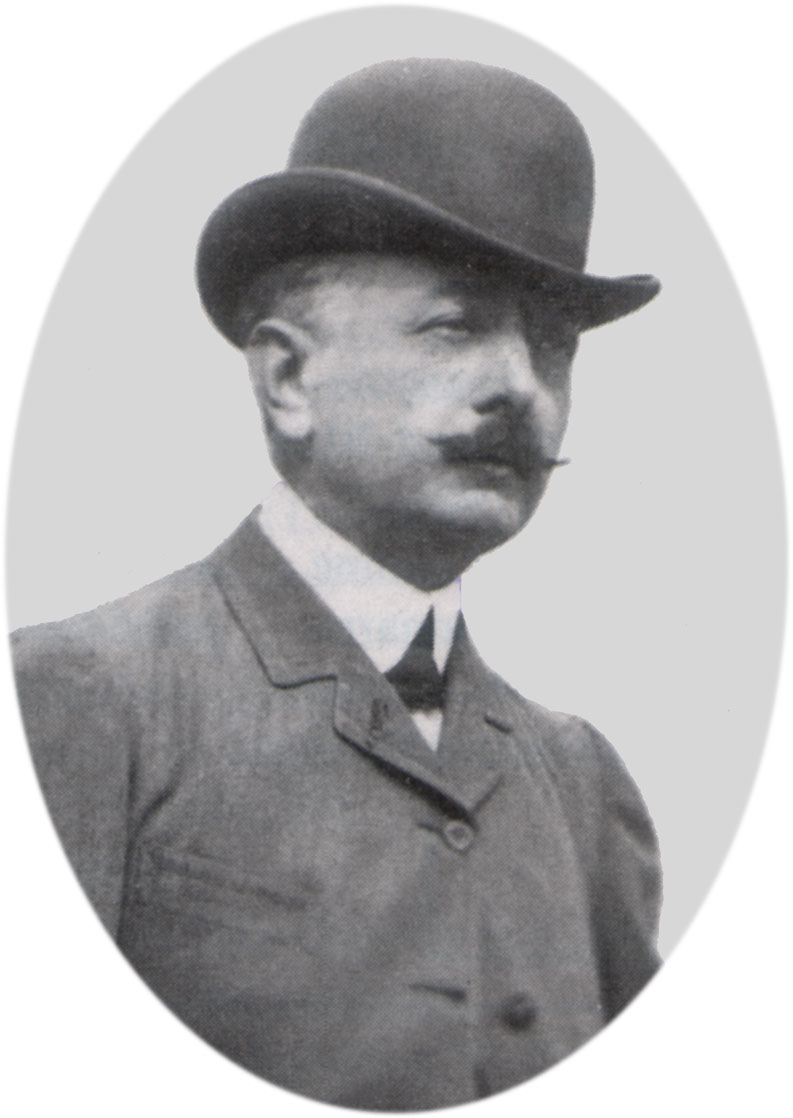
- Edmond Blanc 1856–1920
- Class: Group 3
- Location: Saint-Cloud Racecourse; Saint-Cloud, France
- Inaugurated: 1921
- Race type: Flat / Thoroughbred
- Website: france-galop.com

Race information
- Distance: 1,600 metres (1 mile)
- Surface: Turf
- Track: Left-handed
- Qualification: Four-years-old and up
- Weight: 57 kg Allowances; 1½ kg for fillies and mares Penalties; 3 kg for Group 1 winners * 2 kg for Group 2 winners * 1 kg for Group 3 winners * * since 1 August last year
- Purse: €80,000 (2021); 1st: €40,000

Prix Edmond Blanc
2024
Tribalist	Marhaba Ya Sanafi	Topgear

Previous years
2023
Tribalist	The Revenant	Facteur Cheval
2022
The Revenant	Duhail	Pao Alto
2021
Wally	Duhail	The Revenant

2020-2011
2019
The Revenant	Graphite	Lunch Lady
2018
Stormy Antarctic	Nice To See You	Jimmy Two Times
2017
Jimmy Two Times	Dicton	Attendu
2016
Maimara	Stillman	Diego Valor
2015
Kalsa	Menardais	Diego Valor
2014
Sommerabend	Kokaltash	Silas Marner
2013
Silas Marner	Menardais	Amaron
2012
Moonwalk In Paris	Evaporation	No Risk At All
2011
Skins Game	Rostrum	Silverside

2010-2001
2010
Gris De Gris	Skins Game	Liang Kay
2009
Gris De Gris	Alnadana	Racinger
2008
Konig Turf	Gris De Gris	Spirito Del Vento
2007
Racinger	Turtle Bowl	Passager
2006
Svedov	Art Master	Helios Quercus
2005
Valentino	Special Kaldoun	Tiganello
2004
My Risk	Art Moderne	Sarre
2003
Salselon	Almond Mousse	Massigann
2002
Bedawin	Okawango	Cornelius
2001
Golani	Island Sands	Dionello

2000-1990
2000
Dansili	Iridanos	Bartex
1999
Gold Away	Sand Falcon	Loudeac
1998
Marathon	Keos	Kaldou Star
1997
Simon Du Desert	Precious Ring	Trojan Sea
1996
Wavy Run	Nec Plus Ultra	Alamtara
1995
Kaldounevees	Agathe	Les Boyer
1994
Flag Down	Kitwood	Jackdidi
1993
Take Risks	Shanghai	Kitwood
1992
Exit To Nowhere	Zanadiyka	Goofalik
1991
Polar Falcon	Boxing Day	Eightsome
1990
Val Des Bois	Mister Sicy	Ocean Falls

The Prix Edmond Blanc is a Group 3 flat horse race in France open to thoroughbreds aged four years or older. It is run over a distance of 1,600 metres (about 1 mile) at Saint-Cloud in late March or early April.

== History ==
The event is named after Edmond Blanc (1856–1920), a leading racehorse owner who founded Saint-Cloud Racecourse. It was established in 1921, and was originally open to horses aged three or older. It was initially contested over 1,500 metres.

The first winner of the race was owned by Edmond Blanc's widow. Her horse carried the racing colours inherited from her husband, orange jersey and blue cap.

The Prix Edmond Blanc was abandoned throughout World War II, with no running from 1940 to 1945. It was extended to 1,600 metres in 1954.

The race was closed to three-year-olds in 1962. It was cancelled due to bad weather in 1963, 1970 and 1971.

== Records ==
Most successful horse (2 wins):

- Dictateur VIII – 1929, 1931
- Manitou III – 1949, 1950
- Franc Luron – 1959, 1960
- Gris de Gris – 2009, 2010
- The Revenant - 2019, 2022
- Tribalist - 2023, 2024

Leading jockey (6 wins):

- Christophe Soumillon – Bedawin (2002), My Risk (2004), Skins Game (2011), Moonwalk in Paris (2012), Stormy Antarctic (2018), The Revenant (2022)

Leading trainer (7 wins):

- André Fabre – Crystal Glitters (1984), French Stress (1989), Dansili (2000), Jimmy Two Times (2017), Tribalist (2023, 2024), Alcantor (2025)

Leading owner (4 wins):

- Marcel Boussac – Zariba (1923), Goyescas (1933), Negundo (1935), Goya II (1939)
- Jean Stern – Sanguinetto (1937), Salieri (1938), Franc Luron (1959, 1960)

== Winners since 1981 ==
Year	Winner	Age	Jockey	Trainer	Owner	Time
1981	In Fijar	4	Alfred Gibert	Mitri Saliba	Mahmoud Fustok	1:56.10
1982	The Wonder	4	Freddy Head	Jacques de Chevigny	Marquesa de Moratalla
1983	Kebir	4	Greville Starkey	Patrick Biancone	Pierre Goral	1:51.20
1984	Crystal Glitters	4	Alfred Gibert	André Fabre	Mahmoud Fustok	1:50.40
1985	Nikos	4	Alain Badel	J. C. Cunnington	Countess Batthyany	1:55.20
1986	Ephialtes	4	Alain Junk	Charlie Milbank	Egon Wanke	1:45.80
1987	Highest Honor	4	Eric Saint-Martin	Pascal Bary	Ecurie I. M. Fares	1:53.70
1988	Rose or No	4	Gérard Dubroeucq	Philippe Demercastel	Ecurie Jules Ouaki	1:58.70
1989	French Stress	4	Cash Asmussen	André Fabre	Paul de Moussac	1:49.10
1990	Val des Bois	4	Guy Guignard	Criquette Head	Jacques Wertheimer	1:40.40
1991	Polar Falcon (Note: The 1991 running took place at Évry)	4	Cash Asmussen	John Hammond	David Thompson	1:39.32
1992	Exit to Nowhere	4	Freddy Head	François Boutin	Stavros Niarchos	1:53.20
1993	Take Risks	4	Mathieu Boutin	Jean Lesbordes	David Tsui	1:46.30
1994	Flag Down	4	Gérald Mossé	John Hammond	Cheveley Park Stud	1:50.50
1995	Kaldounevees	4	Cash Asmussen	John Hammond	Ecurie Chalhoub	1:41.80
1996	Wavy Run	5	Olivier Doleuze	Carlos Laffon-Parias	Jose Gonzalez	1:41.50
1997	Simon du Desert	4	Christian Hanotel	Robert Collet	Arne Larsson	1:39.00
1998	Marathon	4	Olivier Doleuze	Criquette Head	Alec Head	1:43.60
1999	Gold Away	4	Olivier Doleuze	Criquette Head	Wertheimer et Frère	1:46.90
2000	Dansili	4	Olivier Peslier	André Fabre	Khalid Abdullah	1:54.00
2001	Golani	4	Davy Bonilla	Élie Lellouche	Claude Cohen	1:54.70
2002	Bedawin	6	Christophe Soumillon	François Doumen	Henri de Pracomtal	1:41.40
2003	Salselon	4	Alessandro Parravani	Mario Ciciarelli	Scuderia Briantea	1:41.80
2004	My Risk	5	Christophe Soumillon	Jean-Marie Béguigné	Roland Monnier	1:43.00
2005	Valentino	6	Ioritz Mendizabal	Alain de Royer-Dupré	Fierro / Forien	1:48.90
2006	Svedov	5	Stéphane Pasquier	Élie Lellouche	Claude Cohen	1:52.00
2007	Racinger	4	Davy Bonilla	Freddy Head	Pierre Goral	1:43.60
2008	König Turf	6	Stéphane Pasquier	Christian Sprengel	Stall Route 66	1:52.20
2009	Gris de Gris	5	Gérald Mossé	Alain de Royer-Dupré	Jean-Claude Seroul	1:43.20
2010	Gris de Gris	6	Christophe Lemaire	Alain de Royer-Dupré	Jean-Claude Seroul	1:50.30
2011	Skins Game	5	Christophe Soumillon	Jean-Claude Rouget	Marquesa de Moratalla	1:48.10
2012	Moonwalk in Paris	4	Christophe Soumillon	Jean-Claude Rouget	Ecurie J. L. Tepper	1:40.60
2013	Silas Marner	6	Jean-Bernard Eyquem	Jean-Claude Rouget	Cuadra Montalban SRL	1:48.30
2014	Sommerabend	7	Gérald Mossé	Mirek Rulec	Stall Am Alten	1:42.51
2015	Kalsa	4	Grégory Benoist	Robert Collet	James Oldham	1:47.14
2016	Maimara	4	Grégory Benoist	Mikel Delzangles	Alain Louis-Dreyfus	1:46.12
2017	Jimmy Two Times	4	Vincent Cheminaud	André Fabre	Haras de Saint Pair	1:37.78
2018	Stormy Antarctic	5	Christophe Soumillon	Ed Walker	P K Siu	1:48.48
2019	The Revenant	4	Olivier Peslier	Francis-Henri Graffard	Al Asayl France	1:41.73
	no race 2020 (Note: The 2020 running was cancelled because of the COVID-19 pandemic in France)
2021	Wally	4	Cristian Demuro	Jean-Claude Rouget	Ecurie Jean-Pierre Barjon	1:40.35
2022	The Revenant	7	Christophe Soumillon	Francis-Henri Graffard	Al Asayl France	1:41.19
2023	Tribalist	4	Mickael Barzalona	André Fabre	Godolphin	1:42.37
2024	Tribalist	5	Mickael Barzalona	André Fabre	Godolphin	1:56.03
2025	Alcantor	4	Alexis Pouchin	André Fabre	Édouard de Rothschild	1:41.57
2026	Dreamliner	4	Theo Bachelot	Stephane Wattel	P H Betts	1:42.64

== Earlier winners ==
- 1921: Le Filon
- 1922: Bahadur
- 1923: Zariba
- 1924: Niceas
- 1925: Premontre
- 1926: Brumaire
- 1927: King Arthur
- 1928: Orosmade
- 1929: Dictateur VIII
- 1930: Mysarch
- 1931: Dictateur VIII
- 1932: Tapinois
- 1933: Goyescas
- 1934: Le Centaure
- 1935: Negundo
- 1936: Monarkie
- 1937: Sanguinetto
- 1938: Salieri
- 1939: Goya II
- 1940–45: no race
- 1946: Sayani
- 1947: Chanteur
- 1948: Menetrier
- 1949: Manitou III
- 1950: Manitou III
- 1951: Buffalo Bill
- 1952: Orneiro
- 1953: Faubourg
- 1954: Fine Top
- 1955:
- 1956: Beau Prince
- 1957: Tenareze
- 1958: Blockhaus
- 1959: Franc Luron
- 1960: Franc Luron
- 1961: Fin Bec
- 1962: Bobar
- 1963: no race
- 1964: Prima Donna
- 1965: Astaria
- 1966: Dschingis Khan
- 1967: A Tempo
- 1968: Martel
- 1969: Semillant
- 1970–71: no race
- 1972: Marinover
- 1973: La Troublerie
- 1974: El Rastro
- 1975: Afayoon
- 1976: Full of Hope
- 1977: Baly Rockette
- 1978: Sanedtki
- 1979: Weth Nan
- 1980: Wolverton

== See also ==
- List of French flat horse races
