= Logician (horse) =

British Thoroughbred racehorse

- pony racing silks of Khalid Abdullah
- Sire: Frankel
- Grandsire: Galileo
- Dam: Scuffle
- Damsire: Daylami
- Sex: Colt
- Foaled: 29 March 2016
- Country: United Kingdom
- Colour: Roan
- Breeder: Juddmonte Farms
- Owner: Khalid Abdullah
- Trainer: John Gosden
- Record: 7: 6-0-0
- Earnings: £529,036

Major wins
- Great Voltigeur Stakes (2019); St Leger Stakes (2019)

Logician (foaled 29 March 2016) is a British Thoroughbred racehorse. He was unraced as a two-year-old in 2018 but in the following year he established himself as a top-class performer as he won all five of his races including the Great Voltigeur Stakes and the St Leger Stakes. He recovered from a life-threatening bout of peritonitis in December 2019 and won one minor race before sustaining his first defeat in the Cumberland Lodge Stakes.

== Background ==
Logician is a grey horse bred in England by his owner Khalid Abullah's Juddmonte Farms. He was sent into training with John Gosden at Newmarket, Suffolk.

He was from the third crop of foals sired by Frankel, an undefeated racehorse whose other progeny have included Cracksman, Anapurna, Soul Stirring and Without Parole.

Logician's dam Scuffle (from whom he inherited his grey colour) showed some racing ability, winning three minor races in 2008 and later ran third in the Snowdrop Fillies' Stakes. As a broodmare she has also produced the La Prevoyante Handicap winner Suffused. She was a half-sister Cityscape and a descendant of the influential American broodmare Best In Show, the ancestor of numerous major winners including El Gran Senor, Try My Best, Xaar, Jazil, Rags to Riches and Redoute's Choice.

== Racing career ==
=== 2019: three-year-old season ===
On 17 May at Newbury Racecourse Logician made his racecourse debut in a ten furlong maiden race for which he started the 3/1 favourite in a nineteen-runner field. Ridden by Kieran O'Neill he recovered from a slow start to take the lead approaching the final furlong before drawing away in the closing stages to win by two lengths from High Commissioner. Robert Havlin took the ride when the colt started 2/9 favourite for a minor race over the same distance at Newmarket Racecourse on 21 June and won by one and three quarter lengths and a short head from Away He Goes and Persuading. Two weeks later Logician was stepped up in distance for a handicap race over one and a half miles at Newbury and was made the 1/5 favourite despite being assigned top weight of 131 pounds. Partnered by the first time by Frankie Dettori he went to the front two furlongs out and won "easily" by four and a half lengths.

At York Racecourse on 21 August Logician was stepped up in class to contest the Group 2 Great Voltigeur Stakes, a race which is considered a major trial race for the St Leger. With Dettori in the saddle he started the 10/11 favourite against four opponents namely Constantinople (Gallinule Stakes), Nayef Road (Gordon Stakes), Norway (third in the Irish Derby) and Jalmoud (third in the Grand Prix de Paris). After racing in third place behind Norway and Jalmoud, Logician took the lead two furlongs out and "kept on strongly" to win by one and three quarter lengths from Constantinople with a gap of seven lengths back to Norway in third. Dettori commented "There was still a bit of greenness but he hit the line well and galloped out strongly. He's not the finished article but with every race he's improving and he's taken another leap forward".

On 14 September at Doncaster Racecourse Logician started the 5/6 favourite for the 243rd running of the St Leger Stakes over 1 mile 6 furlongs. His seven opponents were Sir Dragonet (Chester Vase, beaten favourite in the Epsom Derby), Sir Ron Priestley (March Stakes), Il Paradiso (third in the Lonsdale Cup), Dashing Willoughby (Queen's Vase), Technician, Nayef Road and Western Australia. The favourite started well but was restrained by Dettori and settled towards the rear as Western Australia set the pace. Logician was angled to the right in the straight to race up the stands side and produced a sustained run, taking the lead in the last quarter mile and winning by two and a quarter lengths from Sir Ron Priestley, with Nayef Road a head away in third place.

In the December 2019 Logician underwent successful treatment for peritonitis at the Newmarket Equine Hospital.

=== 2020: four-year-old season ===
After a lengthy period of recuperation Logician eventually returned to the track in September 2020 in a minor race over ten furlongs at Doncaster in which he started at odds of 1/12 and won "easily" by seven lengths from his sole opponent, the five-year-old Mythical Magic. The Group 3 Cumberland Lodge Stakes at Ascot Racecourse was abandoned owing to a waterlogged course but was rescheduled and run at York on 9 October. Ridden by Martin Harley, Logician went off the 1/3 favourite but tired in the closing stages and came home last of the four runners behind the seven-year-old gelding Euchen Glen, beaten almost ten lengths by the winner.

== Pedigree ==
Pedigree of Logician (GB), roan colt, 2016
Sire Frankel (GB) 2008	Galileo (IRE); 1998	Sadler's Wells (USA)	Northern Dancer (CAN)
Sire Frankel (GB) 2008	Galileo (IRE); 1998	Sadler's Wells (USA)	Fairy Bridge
Sire Frankel (GB) 2008	Galileo (IRE); 1998	Urban Sea (USA)	Miswaki
Sire Frankel (GB) 2008	Galileo (IRE); 1998	Urban Sea (USA)	Allegretta (GB)
Sire Frankel (GB) 2008	Kind (IRE); 2001	Danehill (USA)	Danzig
Sire Frankel (GB) 2008	Kind (IRE); 2001	Danehill (USA)	Razyana
Sire Frankel (GB) 2008	Kind (IRE); 2001	Rainbow Lake (GB)	Rainbow Quest (USA)
Sire Frankel (GB) 2008	Kind (IRE); 2001	Rainbow Lake (GB)	Rockfest (USA)
Dam Scuffle (GB) 2005	Daylami (IRE); 1994	Doyoun	Mill Reef (USA)
Dam Scuffle (GB) 2005	Daylami (IRE); 1994	Doyoun	Dumka (FR)
Dam Scuffle (GB) 2005	Daylami (IRE); 1994	Daltawa	Miswaki (USA)
Dam Scuffle (GB) 2005	Daylami (IRE); 1994	Daltawa	Damana (FR)
Dam Scuffle (GB) 2005	Tantina (USA); 2000	Distant View	Mr Prospector
Dam Scuffle (GB) 2005	Tantina (USA); 2000	Distant View	Seven Springs
Dam Scuffle (GB) 2005	Tantina (USA); 2000	Didina (GB)	Nashwan (USA)
Dam Scuffle (GB) 2005	Tantina (USA); 2000	Didina (GB)	Didicoy (USA) (Family: 8-f)

- Logician was inbred 4 × 4 to Miswaki, meaning that this stallions appears twice in the fourth generation of his pedigree.
