= Nazeef =

British Thoroughbred racehorse

- Racing silks of Hamdan Al Maktoum
- Sire: Invincible Spirit
- Grandsire: Green Desert
- Dam: Handassa
- Damsire: Dubawi
- Sex: Filly
- Foaled: 13 April 2016
- Country: United Kingdom
- Colour: Bay
- Breeder: Shadwell Estate
- Owner: Hamdan Al Maktoum
- Trainer: John Gosden
- Record: 11: 7-0-2
- Earnings: £321,260

Major wins
- Snowdrop Fillies' Stakes (2020); Duke of Cambridge Stakes (2020); Falmouth Stakes (2020); Sun Chariot Stakes (2020)

Nazeef (foaled 13 April 2016) is a British Thoroughbred racehorse. Unraced as juvenile she finished third on her racecourse debut in 2019 but then won three minor races before the end of the year. As a four-year-old in 2020 she emerged as a top-class performer, winning the Snowdrop Fillies' Stakes, Duchess of Cambridge Stakes, Falmouth Stakes and Sun Chariot Stakes.

== Background ==
Nazeef is a bay filly with no white markings bred in England by her owner Hamdan Al Maktoum's Shadwell Estate. She was sent into training with John Gosden at the Clarehaven Stable in Newmarket, Suffolk. She has been ridden in most of her races by Jim Crowley.

She was sired by the Haydock Sprint Cup winner Invincible Spirit, who has produced many other major winners including Kingman, Charm Spirit, Mayson, Fleeting Spirit, Moonlight Cloud, Magna Grecia and Lawman. Nazeef's dam Handassa was bought by Shadwell as a yearling for 100,000 guineas and became a successful racemare, winning two races including the Listed Garnet Stakes. Handassa's dam Starstone was a half-sister to the leading sprinters Pastoral Pursuits and Goodricke.

== Racing career ==
=== 2019: three-year-old season ===
Nazeef did not run as a two-year-old and made her racecourse debut in a minor race over seven furlongs at Newmarket Racecourse on 8 June 2019 in which she was ridden by Nicky Mackay and finished third behind Nonchalance and Flarepath, beaten five and a quarter lengths by the winner. Nineteen days later she started 4/6 favourite for a seven-runner maiden race over the same course and distance and recorded her first success as she took the lead approaching the final furlong and won by one and a quarter lengths from the four-year-old gelding Ghalyoon. On 4 September the filly started at odds of 1/4 for a novice race (for horses with no more than two previous wins) over one mile on the synthetic Polytrack surface at Chelmsford City Racecourse and won "very easily" after accelerating away from her three opponents in the final furlong. For her final run of the season, Nazeef was returned to the turf for a handicap race over one mile at Newmarket three weeks later in which she carried top weight of 134 pounds and started 6/4 favourite. Ridden by Dane O'Neill she took the lead inside the last quarter mile and won in "impressive" style by six lengths from Salayel.

=== 2020: four-year-old season ===
For her first run of 2020 Nazeef was stepped up in class to contest the Listed Snowdrop Fillies' Stakes over one mile on Polytrack at Kempton Park Racecourse. Owing to the COVID-19 pandemic the British flat-racing season was restructured leading to the race being run behind closed doors on 3 June (rather than its usual date in April) and being open to three-year-olds. Nazeef started the 4/1 third choice in the betting behind her stablemate Scentasia (winner of the Fleur De Lys Fillies' Stakes and the Gillies Fillies' Stakes) and Billesdon Brook. After being restrained by Crowley for most of the way she made strong progress on the outside in the straight, overtook Billesdon Brook in the closing stages and won "cosily" by three quarters of a length. John Gosden's son Thady said "it was a very pleasing performance... she has strengthened and matured nicely this year. Hopefully she will continue to improve" while Crowley commented "She has done nothing but improve with every run she has had in the last year and she keeps getting better and better".

Thirteen days after her win at Kempton Nazeef was moved up to Group 2 class for the Duke of Cambridge Stakes at Royal Ascot and started the 100/30 third choice behind the joint-favourites Queen Power (Fillies' Trial Stakes) and Jubiloso. The best fancied of the other seven runners was the Godolphin entry Magic Lily who had won the Balanchine and the Cape Verdi in Dubai. Nazeef raced in mid-division before staying on strongly in the last quarter mile and gained the advantage in the final strides to win by a head from the 28/1 outsider Agincourt. John Gosden commented "Nazeef is very genuine and did nothing but improve last year. She deserves a little rest... We won't rush her back but you'd love to see her have a go at a Group 1".

Nazeef contested her first Group 1 race on 10 July when she started at odds of 9/2 for the Falmouth Stakes over one mile at Newmarket. Her stablemate Terebellum (winner of the Prix de la Nonette and Dahlia Stakes and runner-up in the Queen Anne Stakes) started favourite while the other four contenders were Billesdon Brook, One Master, Agincourt and Under The Stars (Eternal Stakes). After racing in second place behind Terbellum, Nazeef stayed on strongly in the final furlong and won in a blanket finish by a neck from Billesdon Brook with Terebellum the same distance away in third, half a length in front of One Master. After the race Crowley said "She's as tough as nails and she's improved with every run. That's six races in a row she's won now - she's climbed her way up the ladder. She's a really gorgeous looking filly as well, with plenty of size and scope about her".

Three weeks after her win at Newmarket, Nazeef went off the 100/30 second favourite for the Group 1 Nassau Stakes over ten furlongs at Goodwood Racecourse. She stayed on well in the closing stages but never looked likely to win and came home third behind the Irish-trained three-year-olds Fancy Blue and One Voice. On 23 August the filly was sent to France for the Prix Jean Romanet over 2000 metres at Deauville Racecourse and started the 0.7/1 favourite but after being in close contention for most of the way she faded badly in the closing stages and finished ninth of the eleven runners behind Audarya. In the Sun Chariot Stakes over one mile on heavy ground at Newmarket on 3 October Nazeef was ridden by Crowley and started the 17/2 third choice in the betting behind Champers Elysees and Peaceful in a twelve-runner field which also included Veracious, Terebellum, Billesdon Brook, Feliciana De Vega (Darley Stakes), Half Light (Hamburger Stutenmeile) and Cloak of Spirits (second in the 1000 Guineas). Nazeef raced up the stands side (the left hand side from the jockeys' perspective) and settled just behind the leaders as Veracious set the pace from Cloak of Spirits. She made steady progress to deprive Cloak of Spirits of the lead a furlong out and kept on well to win by one and a half lengths from Half Light. John Gosden said "You never expect that you're going to go from Chelmsford handicaps to knocking off two group 1 races at Newmarket, do you? But she's a willing filly and she's quite lazy in her work and looks after herself. She's not one who looks to overdo it, and I think that's a big factor in her progression. She's a grand filly, very brave... It's been a fantastic year for her".

On her final run of the season Nazeef started at odds of 10/1 the Queen Elizabeth II Stakes on heavy ground at Ascot on 17 October. She tracked the leaders before tiring in the last quarter mile and coming home eighth of the fourteen runners behind The Revenant.

== Pedigree ==
Pedigree of Nazeef (GB), bay filly, 2016
Sire Invincible Spirit (IRE) 1997	Green Desert (USA); 1983	Danzig	Northern Dancer (CAN)
Sire Invincible Spirit (IRE) 1997	Green Desert (USA); 1983	Danzig	Pas de Nom
Sire Invincible Spirit (IRE) 1997	Green Desert (USA); 1983	Foreign Courier	Sir Ivor
Sire Invincible Spirit (IRE) 1997	Green Desert (USA); 1983	Foreign Courier	Courtly Dee
Sire Invincible Spirit (IRE) 1997	Rafha (GB); 1987	Kris	Sharpen Up
Sire Invincible Spirit (IRE) 1997	Rafha (GB); 1987	Kris	Doubly Sure
Sire Invincible Spirit (IRE) 1997	Rafha (GB); 1987	Eljazzi (IRE)	Artaius (USA)
Sire Invincible Spirit (IRE) 1997	Rafha (GB); 1987	Eljazzi (IRE)	Border Bounty (GB)
Dam Handassa (GB) 2008	Dubawi (IRE); 2002	Dubai Millennium (GB)	Seeking The Gold (USA)
Dam Handassa (GB) 2008	Dubawi (IRE); 2002	Dubai Millennium (GB)	Colorado Dancer (IRE)
Dam Handassa (GB) 2008	Dubawi (IRE); 2002	Zomaradah (GB)	Deploy
Dam Handassa (GB) 2008	Dubawi (IRE); 2002	Zomaradah (GB)	Jawaher (IRE)
Dam Handassa (GB) 2008	Starstone (GB); 2003	Diktat	Warning
Dam Handassa (GB) 2008	Starstone (GB); 2003	Diktat	Arvola
Dam Handassa (GB) 2008	Starstone (GB); 2003	Star	Most Welcome
Dam Handassa (GB) 2008	Starstone (GB); 2003	Star	Marista (Family: 14-f)
