= Snowdrop Fillies' Stakes =

Flat horse race in Britain

- Class: Conditions
- Location: Kempton Park, Sunbury, England
- Race type: Flat / Thoroughbred
- Sponsor: Unibet
- Website: Kempton Park

Race information
- Distance: 1 mile (1,609 metres)
- Surface: Polytrack
- Track: Right-handed
- Qualification: Four-years-old and up fillies and mares excluding Group winners
- Weight: 9 st 0 lb Penalties; 7 lb for Group 1 or Group 2 winners * 5 lb for Group 3 winners * 3 lb for Listed winners* * since 31 August last year
- Purse: £51,152 (2022); 1st: £29,489

Snowdrop Fillies' Stakes
2026
Pina Sonata	Never Let Go	Cathedral

Previous years
2025
Soprano	Crimson Advocate	Rubies From Burma
2024
Adelaise	Choisya	Rose Prick
2022
Roman Mist	Potapova	My Astra
2021
Lavender's Blue	Fooraat	Amniarix

2020-2011
2020
Nazeef	Billesdon Brook	Shepherd Market
2019
Agrotera	Preening	Rawdaa
2018
Hunaina	Shenanigans	Soul Silver
2017
Aljazzi	Materialistic	Zest
2016
Kyllachy Queen	Volunteer Point	Light And Shade
2015
Lady Dutch	Solar Magic	Victoria Regina
2014
Ribbons	Magic of Reality	Broadway Duchess
2013
Lily's Angel	Stirring Ballad	Love Your Looks
2012
Captivator	Law Of The Range	Sooraah
2011
Agony And Ecstasy	Night Lily	Maid In Heaven

2010-2004
2010
Shamwari Lodge	Mosqueras Romance	Chantilly Tiffany
2009
Born Tobouggie	Perfect Star	Scuffle
2008
Heaven Sent	Chantilly Tiffany	Nans Joy
2007
Expensive	Dont Dili Dali	Rakata
2006
Royal Alchemist	Violet Park	Nice Tune
2005
Tarfah	Dumnoni	Weecandoo
2004
Beneventa	Soviet Song	Monturani

The Snowdrop Fillies' Stakes is a Listed flat horse race in Great Britain open to fillies and mares aged four years or older. It is run over a distance of 1 mile (1,609 metres) at Kempton Park in March or April.

The race was first run in 2004.

== Winners ==
Year	Winner	Age	Jockey	Trainer	Time
2004	Beneventa	4	Seb Sanders	John Dunlop	1:43.11
2005	Tarfah	4	John Egan	Gerard Butler	1:41.94
2006	Royal Alchemist	4	Martin Dwyer	Mark Usher	1:38.77
2007	Expensive	4	Eddie Ahern	Chris Wall	1:38.03
2008	Heaven Sent	5	Ryan Moore	Sir Michael Stoute	1:39.05
2009	Born Tobouggie	4	Tom Queally	Henry Cecil	1:37.08
2010	Shamwari Lodge	4	Richard Hughes	Richard Hannon Sr.	1:38.07
2011	Agony And Ecstasy	4	Richard Kingscote	Ralph Beckett	1:37.87
2012	Captivator	5	Kieren Fallon	James Fanshawe	1:36.96
2013	Lily's Angel	4	Gary Carroll	Ger Lyons	1:36.18
2014	Ribbons (Note: Zurigha finished first in 2014 but was disqualified for having a banned substance in a dope test sample)	4	Hayley Turner	James Fanshawe	1:38.54
2015	Lady Dutch	4	Martin Harley	Marco Botti	1:38.24
2016	Kyllachy Queen	4	Andrea Atzeni	Marco Botti	1:38.62
2017	Aljazzi	4	Ryan Moore	Marco Botti	1:37.91
2018	Hunaina	4	Alexis Badel	Henri-Francois Devin	1:37.02
2019	Agrotera	4	Gérald Mossé	Ed Walker	1:37.01
2020 (Note: The 2020 race was also open to three-year-olds as part of race conditions changes arising from the COVID-19 pandemic in the United Kingdom)	Nazeef	4	Jim Crowley	John Gosden	1:38.15
2021	Lavender's Blue	5	Robert Havlin	Amanda Perrett	1:38.55
2022	Roman Mist	4	Richard Kingscote	Tom Ward	1:37.46
2023	Laurel	4	Ryan Moore	John & Thady Gosden	1:39.11
2024	Adelaise	5	William Buick	Joseph O'Brien	1:40.10
2025	Soprano	4	William Buick	George Boughey	1:39.16
2026	Pina Sonata	4	Daniel Muscutt	James Fanshawe	1:37.91

== See also ==
- Horse racing in Great Britain
- List of British flat horse races
