= Falmouth Stakes =

Flat horse race in Britain

- Class: Group 1
- Location: July Course; Newmarket, England
- Inaugurated: 1911
- Race type: Flat / Thoroughbred
- Sponsor: Tattersalls
- Website: Newmarket

Race information
- Distance: 1 mile (1,609 metres)
- Surface: Turf
- Track: Straight
- Qualification: Three-years-old and up fillies & mares
- Weight: 9 st 0 lb (3yo); 9 st 9 lb (4yo+)
- Purse: £291,565 (2023); 1st: £165,347

Falmouth Stakes
2026
Blue Bolt	Precise	Balantina

Previous years
2025
Cinderella's Dream	January	Crimson Advocate
2024
Porta Fortuna	Jabaara	A Lilac Rolla
2023
Nashwa	Remarquee	Via Sistina
2022
Prosperous Voyage	Inspiral	Sandrine
2021
Snow Lantern	Mother Earth	Alcohol Free

2020-2011
2020
Nazeef	Billesdon Brook	Terebellum
2019
Veracious	One Master	I Can Fly
2018
Alpha Centauri	Altyn Orda	Clemmie
2017
Roly Poly	Wuheida	Arabian Hope
2016
Alice Springs	Very Special	Always Smile
2015
Amazing Maria	Euro Charline	Avenir Certain
2014
Integral	Rizeena	Peace Burg
2013
Elusive Kate	Sky Lantern	Giofra
2012
Giofra	Elusive Kate	Siyouma
2011
Timepiece	Sahpresa	First City

2010-2001
2010
Music Show	Spacious	Rainfall
2009
Goldikova	Heaven Sent	Spacious
2008
Nahoodh	Infallible	Heaven Sent
2007
Simply Perfect	Irridescence	Arch Swing
2006
Rajeem	Nannina	Musicanna
2005
Soviet Song	Alexander Goldrun	Peeress
2004
Soviet Song	Attraction	Baqah
2003
Macadamia	Waldmark	Walzerkoenigin
2002
Tashawak	Golden Silca	Kootenay
2001
Proudwings	Heavenly Whisper	Lady Lahar

2000-1991
2000
Alshakr	Croeso Cariad	Danceabout
1999
Ronda	Balisada	Cape Verdi
1998
Lovers Knot	Wren	Flawless
1997
Ryafan	Ocean Ridge	Theano
1996
Sensation	Ta Rib	Donna Viola
1995
Caramba	Gay Gallanta	Harayir
1994
Lemon Souffle	Girl From Ipanema	Reason To Dance
1993
Niche	Dancing Bloom	Culture Vulture
1992
Gussy Marlowe	Lovealoch	Wiedniu
1991
Only Yours	Trojan Crown	Satin Flower

1990-1983
1990
Chimes Of Freedom	Arousal	Hasbah
1989
Magic Gleam	Ensconse	Guest Artiste
1988
Inchmurrin	Dabaweyaa	Ohsomellow
1987
Sonic Lady	Shaikiya	White Mischief
1986
Sonic Lady	Dusty Dollar	Argon Laser
1985
Al Bahathri	Ever Genial	Bella Colora
1984
Meis El-Reem	Katies	Mahogany
1983
Royal Heroine	Flamenco	Linda's Fantasy

The Falmouth Stakes is a Group 1 flat horse race in Great Britain open to fillies and mares aged three years or older. It is run on the July Course at Newmarket over a distance of 1 mile (1,609 metres), and it is scheduled to take place each year in July.

== History ==
The event is named in honour of Evelyn Boscawen, 6th Viscount Falmouth, who was a leading racehorse owner and breeder in the 19th century. It was established in 1911, and it was originally restricted to three-year-old fillies.

The present system of race grading was introduced in 1971, and the Falmouth Stakes was initially classed at Group 3 level. It was opened to older fillies and mares in 1974. It became known as the Child Stakes in 1975, when Child's Bank began a period of sponsorship. It was promoted to Group 2 level in 1987, and it reverted to its original name in 1992. It was raised to Group 1 status in 2004.

The Falmouth Stakes is currently held on the second day of Newmarket's three-day July Festival meeting.

== Records ==
Most successful horse (2 wins):

- Sonic Lady – 1986, 1987
- Soviet Song – 2004, 2005

Leading jockey (7 wins):

- Lester Piggott – Sylphide (1957), Green Opal (1960), Chrona (1966), Vital Match (1969), Chalon (1982), Niche (1993), Lemon Souffle (1994)

Leading trainer (6 wins):

- Alec Taylor, Jr. – First Spear (1914), Tomatina (1919), Lady Ava (1920), Blue Lady (1921), Leighon Tor (1922), Maid of Bath (1924)
- Sir Michael Stoute - Royal Heroine (1983), Sonic Lady (1986 & 1987), Lovers Knot (1998), Integral (2014), Veracious (2019)

Leading owner (4 wins):

- Waldorf Astor, 2nd Viscount Astor – First Spear (1914), Point Duty (1929), Pennycross (1932), Wheedler (1946)

== Winners ==
Year	Winner	Age	Jockey	Trainer	Owner	Time
1911	Alice	3	Herbert Jones	Willie Waugh
1912	Saucy Vixen	3	Fred Herbert	Jenkins
1913	Queen's Parade	3	Edwin Piper	Lewis
1914	First Spear	3	James Clark	Alec Taylor Jr.	Lord Astor
1915	Silver Tag	3	Steve Donoghue	Richard Dawson
1916	Eos	3	Frank Bullock	George Lambton
	no race 1917
1918	Herself	3	Freddie Fox	Reg Day
1919	Tomatina	3	Victor Smyth	Alec Taylor Jr.		1:43.00
1920	Lady Ava	3	Joe Childs	Alec Taylor Jr.
1921	Blue Lady	3	Joe Childs	Alec Taylor Jr.		1:44.00
1922	Leighon Tor	3	Steve Donoghue	Alec Taylor Jr.		1:39.80
1923	Shrove	3	Charlie Elliott	Dawson Waugh
1924	Maid Of Bath	3	Joe Childs	Alec Taylor Jr.		1:41.40
1925	Bar Sinister	3	Bobby Jones	Harry Cottrill
1926	Glasheen	3	Joe Childs	Cecil Boyd-Rochfort		1:41.00
1927	Hunt The Slipper	3	Joe Childs	Cecil Boyd-Rochfort	Cecil Boyd-Rochfort	1:44.00
1928	Mara	3	Michael Beary	Richard Dawson		1:37.40
1929	Point Duty	3	Henri Jellis	Joseph Lawson	Lord Astor	1:40.00
1930	Theresina	3	Michael Beary	Richard Dawson		1:42.20
1931	Pisa	3	Tommy Weston	George Lambton		1:41.00
1932	Pennycross	3	Bobby Dick	Joseph Lawson	Lord Astor	1:41.20
1933	Eclair	3	Joe Childs	Cecil Boyd-Rochfort	M Field	1:40.20
1934	Mis Tor	3	Bobby Jones	Joseph Lawson	Mrs W M G Singer	1:40.20
1935	Coppelia	3	Harry Wragg	Fred Templeman	Lord Hirst	1:38.00
1936	Crested Crane	3	Bobby Jones	Jack Jarvis	Sir L Philipps	1:47.20
1937	Tumbrel	3	Gordon Richards	Fred Darling	Lord Lonsdale	1:41.60
1938	La-Li	3	Charlie Smirke	Frank Butters	Aga Khan III	1:40.20
1939	Bountiful	3	Bobby Jones	Joseph Lawson	A R Cox	1:41.80
	no race 1940
1941	Commotion	3	Harry Wragg	Fred Darling	John Arthur Dewar	1:40.60
	no race 1942-44
1945	Sweet Cygnet	3	Charlie Elliott	Fred Rimell	Major H H Leven	1:42.20
1946	Wheedler	3	Clifford Richards	Joseph Lawson	Lord Astor	1:44.40
1947	Mermaid	3	Eph Smith	Jack Jarvis	Lord Rosebery	1:43.80
1948	Goblet	3	Gordon Richards	Noel Murless	Fred Darling	1:42.80
1949	Suntime	3	Edgar Britt	Marcus Marsh	J Musker	1:45.40
1950	Val d'Assa	3	Stan Smith	Atty Persse	Major D McCalmont	1:43.40
1951	Red Shoes	3	Eph Smith	John Watts	H J Joel	1:41.00
1952	Queen Of Light	3	Eph Smith	John Watts	H J Joel	1:39.60
1953	Happy Laughter	3	Bill Rickaby	Jack Jarvis	David Wills	1:41.75
1954	Sundry	3	Doug Smith	George Colling	Lord Derby	1:38.90
1955	Gloria Nicky	3	Scobie Breasley	Norman Bertie	Mrs R Digby	1:41.34
1956	Following Breeze	3	Bill Rickaby	Norman Bertie	Clifford Nicholson	1:48.59
1957	Sylphide	3	Lester Piggott	Noel Murless	T Lilley	1:42.03
1958	Court One	3	Doug Smith	Noel Murless	The Queen	1:45.92
1959	Crystal Palace	3	Eph Smith	Ted Leader	H J Joel	1:42.52
1960	Green Opal	3	Lester Piggott	Noel Murless	Lieutenant-Colonel Giles Loder	1:51.43
1961	Aphrodita	3	Joe Mercer	Harry Wragg	G A Oldham	1:43.74
1962	Tournella	3	Bill Rickaby	Fergie Sutherland	Mrs E N Hall	1:42.75
1963	Crevette	3	Doug Smith	Geoffrey Brooke	Vilma Lady Butt	1:42.10
1964	Alborada	3	Greville Starkey	John Oxley	Lady Halifax	1:43.31
1965	Pugnacity	3	Joe Mercer	Walter Wharton	Major L B Holliday	1:42.04
1966	Chrona	3	Lester Piggott	Fulke Johnson Houghton	H D H Wills	1:40.72
1967	Resilience II	3	Brian Taylor	Harvey Leader	Dr Carlo Vittadini	1:48.45
1968	Ileana	3	Ron Hutchinson	Harry Wragg	G A Oldham	1:43.80
1969	Vital Match	3	Lester Piggott	Herbert Blagrave	Herbert Blagrave	1:44.24
1970	Caprera	3	Ron Hutchinson	Harry Wragg	G A Oldham	1:42.58
1971	Favoletta	3	Brian Taylor	Harry Wragg	Ralph Moller	1:43.44
1972	Waterloo	3	Eddie Hide	Bill Watts	Mrs R Stanley	1:45.19
1973	Jacinth	3	John Gorton	Bruce Hobbs	Lady Butt	1:41.41
1974	Himawari	3	Frank Morby	Fulke Johnson Houghton	Junzo Kashiyama	1:39.09
1975	Sauceboat	3	Geoff Lewis	Noel Murless	Lieutenant-Colonel J Hornung	1:42.72
1976	Duboff	4	Eddie Hide	Barry Hills	Mrs C Radclyffe	1:40.48
1977	River Dane	3	Alfred Gibert	Age Paus	Robert Sangster	1:39.04
1978	Cistus	4	Willie Carson	Dick Hern	Sir Michael Sobell	1:40.28
1979	Rose Above	4	Willie Carson	Michael Cunningham	James O'Reilly	1:38.75
1980	Stumped	3	George Duffield	Bruce Hobbs	Tony Villar	1:41.91
1981	Star Pastures	3	Pat Eddery	Jeremy Hindley	Robert Sangster	1:40.61
1982	Chalon	3	Lester Piggott	Henry Cecil	Michael Riordan	1:39.05
1983	Royal Heroine	3	Walter Swinburn	Michael Stoute	Robert Sangster	1:41.35
1984	Meis El-Reem	3	Steve Cauthen	Olivier Douieb	Bechara Choucair	1:39.57
1985	Al Bahathri	3	Tony Murray	Harry Thomson Jones	Hamdan Al Maktoum	1:36.93
1986	Sonic Lady	3	Walter Swinburn	Michael Stoute	Sheikh Mohammed	1:37.45
1987	Sonic Lady	4	Walter Swinburn	Michael Stoute	Sheikh Mohammed	1:38.09
1988	Inchmurrin	3	Paul Eddery	Geoff Wragg	Sir Philip Oppenheimer	1:42.92
1989	Magic Gleam	3	Pat Eddery	Alex Scott	Maktoum Al Maktoum	1:37.50
1990	Chimes of Freedom	3	Steve Cauthen	Henry Cecil	Stavros Niarchos	1:37.05
1991	Only Yours	3	Michael Roberts	Richard Hannon Sr.	Mrs M. Butcher	1:40.43
1992	Gussy Marlowe	4	Michael Roberts	Clive Brittain	Lucille van Geest	1:40.24
1993	Niche	3	Lester Piggott	Richard Hannon Sr.	7th Earl of Carnarvon	1:37.08
1994	Lemon Souffle	3	Lester Piggott	Richard Hannon Sr.	7th Earl of Carnarvon	1:41.30
1995	Caramba	3	Michael Roberts	Richard Hannon Sr.	7th Earl of Carnarvon	1:40.17
1996	Sensation	3	Michael Kinane	Criquette Head	Sheikh Mohammed	1:37.53
1997	Ryafan	3	Pat Eddery	John Gosden	Khalid Abdullah	1:38.43
1998	Lovers Knot	3	John Reid	Sir Michael Stoute	Cheveley Park Stud	1:35.53
1999	Ronda	3	Dominique Boeuf	Carlos Laffon-Parias	Dario Hinojosa	1:37.49
2000	Alshakr	3	Richard Hills	Ben Hanbury	Hamdan Al Maktoum	1:39.70
2001	Proudwings	5	Yutaka Take	Ralf Suerland	Hyperion Breeding	1:38.73
2002	Tashawak	3	Richard Hills	John Dunlop	Hamdan Al Maktoum	1:38.05
2003	Macadamia	4	Jamie Spencer	James Fanshawe	3rd Baron Vestey	1:38.11
2004	Soviet Song	4	Johnny Murtagh	James Fanshawe	Elite Racing Club	1:36.11
2005	Soviet Song	5	Johnny Murtagh	James Fanshawe	Elite Racing Club	1:38.99
2006	Rajeem	3	Kerrin McEvoy	Clive Brittain	Saeed Manana	1:40.89
2007	Simply Perfect	3	Johnny Murtagh	Jeremy Noseda	Smith / Tabor / Magnier	1:37.14
2008	Nahoodh	3	Frankie Dettori	Mark Johnston	H. bin M. Al Maktoum	1:38.60
2009	Goldikova	4	Olivier Peslier	Freddy Head	Wertheimer et Frère	1:36.21
2010	Music Show	3	Richard Hughes	Mick Channon	Jaber Abdullah	1:36.76
2011	Timepiece	4	Tom Queally	Sir Henry Cecil	Khalid Abdullah	1:41.06
2012	Giofra	4	Christophe Soumillon	Alain de Royer-Dupré	Haras de la Perelle	1:42.14
2013	Elusive Kate	4	William Buick	John Gosden	Teruya Yoshida	1:40.54
2014	Integral	4	Ryan Moore	Sir Michael Stoute	Cheveley Park Stud	1:41.96
2015	Amazing Maria	4	James Doyle	David O'Meara	Sir Robert Ogden	1:42.05
2016	Alice Springs	3	Ryan Moore	Aidan O'Brien	Smith / Tabor / Magnier	1:34.42
2017	Roly Poly	3	Ryan Moore	Aidan O'Brien	Smith / Tabor / Magnier	1:36.01
2018	Alpha Centauri	3	Colm O'Donoghue	Jessica Harrington	Niarchos Family	1:37.45
2019	Veracious	4	Oisin Murphy	Sir Michael Stoute	Cheveley Park Stud	1:35.89
2020	Nazeef	4	Jim Crowley	John Gosden	Hamdan Al Maktoum	1:40.14
2021	Snow Lantern	3	Sean Levey	Richard Hannon Jr.	Rockcliffe Stud	1:35.93
2022	Prosperous Voyage	3	Rob Hornby	Ralph Beckett	Marc Chan & Andrew Rosen	1:36.03
2023	Nashwa	4	Hollie Doyle	John & Thady Gosden	Imad Alsagar	1:39.52
2024	Porta Fortuna	3	Ryan Moore	Donnacha O'Brien	Medallion/S Weston/B Fowler/Reeves T'Bs	1:37.68
2025	Cinderella's Dream	4	William Buick	Charlie Appleby	Godolphin	1:37.89
2026	Blue Bolt	4	Colin Keane	Andrew Balding	Juddmonte	1:37.38

== See also ==
- Horse racing in Great Britain
- List of British flat horse races
