= Teppal =

French-bred Thoroughbred racehorse

- Sire: Camacho
- Grandsire: Danehill
- Dam: Jummana
- Damsire: Cadeaux Genereux
- Sex: Mare
- Foaled: 10 May 2015
- Country: France
- Colour: Bay
- Breeder: Gestut Zur Kuste Ag
- Owner: DMI Simcock; Mohammed Bin Khalifa Al Thani
- Trainer: David Simcock
- Record: 5: 3-0-0
- Earnings: £261,242

Major wins
- Poule d'Essai des Pouliches (2018)

Teppal (foaled 10 May 2015) is a French-bred, British-bred Thoroughbred racehorse. As a two-year-old in 2017 she won two minor races from two starts. On her first appearance of 2018 she recorded her biggest victory when she won the Poule d'Essai des Pouliches. She was unplaced in two subsequent starts that year.

== Background ==
Teppal is a bay filly with a white star and snip bred in France by the German breeding company Gestut Zur Kuste Ag. As a yearling in August 2016 the filly was put up for auction at Deauville and sold for €60,000 to Con Marnane, an Irish horseman who specialises in buying yearlings and training them up before selling them as two-year-olds. In May 2017 Marnane sent the filly back to Deauville for a "breeze-up" sale (in which the horses are publicly galloped before being auctioned) and was bought for €105,000 by Blandford Bloodstock. The filly entered the ownership of David Simcock who trained her at his Newmarket stable.

Her sire, Camacho, was a sprinter who recorded his biggest win in the Sandy Lane Stakes. As a breeding stallion the best of his other offspring have been Signora Cabello (Prix Robert Papin) and My Catch (Prix de Cabourg). Teppal's dam Jummana showed modest racing ability, winning one minor race in France in 2002. She was descended in the female line from Kalila, who was a half-sister to both Val de Loir and Valoris.

Teppal is a name for a spice related to sichuan pepper.

== Racing career ==
=== 2017: two-year-old season ===
In both of her races as a two-year-old Teppal was ridden by Jamie Spencer. She made her racecourse debut when she started at odds of 11/4 for a maiden race over seven furlongs at Lingfield Park on 30 August and won "cleverly" by a neck from Awesometank after taking the lead in the closing stages. On 25 September the filly started the 11/10 favourite for a minor race over the same distance on the synthetic polytrack surface at Kempton Park Racecourse. After tracking the leaders she went to the front approaching the final furlong and drew away from her twelve opponents to win by four lengths.

=== 2018: three-year-old season ===
Olivier Peslier rode Teppal on all three of her races in 2018. Before the start of the season she was bought privately for "big money" by the Qatari Sheikh Mohammed Bin Khalifa Al Thani. For her first run of the year the filly was sent to France to contest the Poule d'Essai des Pouliches over 1600 metres at Longchamp Racecourse on 13 May and started at odds of 12/1 in a fourteen-runner field. The Prix de la Grotte winner Musis Amica started favourite while the other fancied runners included Polydream (Prix du Calvados), Barkaa (Prix Vanteaux), Zonza (Prix du Bois), Coeur de Beaute (Prix Imprudence) and Wind Chimes (Prix Herod). The race was scheduled to took place on Longchamp's middle track, but after protests from some jockeys and trainers about the state of the racing surface the event was moved to the outer track. Teppal started well and settled in third place behind Could It Be Love and Sea Prose. As the field turned into the straight she appeared to be trapped on the inside rail but Peslier switched her to the outside to deliver a strong late run. Teppal gained the advantage in the closing stages and prevailed by a short neck and a head from Coeur de Beaute and Wind Chimes in a bunched finish which saw twelve of the beaten horses finish within four lengths of the winner. After the race David Simcock said "I'm made up. It's just nice to get a horse good enough to compete in a race like this and so to train a first Classic winner is fantastic. We were hopeful beforehand as she's very streetwise and she was in good shape. We weren’t overly fussed when the course was changed and Olivier Peslier gave her a great ride".

On her return to England Teppal started at odds of 7/1 for the Coronation Stakes at Royal Ascot on 22 June. She never looked likely to maintain her unbeaten record and finished ninth of the twelve runners behind Alpha Centauri, beaten fourteen and a half lengths by the winner. Simcock described the performance as "seriously disappointing" but explained that she came back from the race a sick horse who was underweight and "visibly under the weather" for weeks afterwards.

After a break of more than three months the filly returned on 7 October in the Prix de la Forêt over 1400 metres at Longchamp in which she was matched against older horses for the first time. She raced close behind the leaders for most of the way but faded in the closing stages and came home ninth behind One Master.

== Pedigree ==
Pedigree of Teppal (FR), bay filly, 2015
Sire Camacho (GB) 2002	Danehill (USA); 1986	Danzig	Northern Dancer (CAN)
Sire Camacho (GB) 2002	Danehill (USA); 1986	Danzig	Pas de Nom
Sire Camacho (GB) 2002	Danehill (USA); 1986	Razyana	His Majesty
Sire Camacho (GB) 2002	Danehill (USA); 1986	Razyana	Spring Adieu (CAN)
Sire Camacho (GB) 2002	Arabesque; 1997	Zafonic (USA)	Gone West
Sire Camacho (GB) 2002	Arabesque; 1997	Zafonic (USA)	Zaizafon
Sire Camacho (GB) 2002	Arabesque; 1997	Prophecy (IRE)	Warning (GB)
Sire Camacho (GB) 2002	Arabesque; 1997	Prophecy (IRE)	Andaleeb (USA)
Dam Jummana (FR) 2000	Cadeaux Genereux (GB); 1985	Young Generation (IRE)	Balidar (GB)
Dam Jummana (FR) 2000	Cadeaux Genereux (GB); 1985	Young Generation (IRE)	Brig o'Doon (IRE)
Dam Jummana (FR) 2000	Cadeaux Genereux (GB); 1985	Smarten Up	Sharpen Up
Dam Jummana (FR) 2000	Cadeaux Genereux (GB); 1985	Smarten Up	Languissola
Dam Jummana (FR) 2000	Forty Belles (USA); 1991	Forty Niner	Mr. Prospector
Dam Jummana (FR) 2000	Forty Belles (USA); 1991	Forty Niner	File
Dam Jummana (FR) 2000	Forty Belles (USA); 1991	Bellarida (FR)	Bellypha (IRE)
Dam Jummana (FR) 2000	Forty Belles (USA); 1991	Bellarida (FR)	Lerida (Family: 5-h)
