= Herbert Blagrave =

English cricketer and racehorse trainer

Herbert Henry Gratwicke Blagrave (3 March 1899 – 4 July 1981) was an English cricketer and racehorse trainer. He was a slow bowler who played for Gloucestershire.

== Early life ==
Blagrave was born at Charlton Kings near Cheltenham, son of John Gratwicke Blagrave (1853–1926), of Hambrook House, Charlton Kings, Captain (and hon. Major) in the North Somerset Imperial Yeomanry, and his wife, Fanny Julia (d. 1939), daughter of Sir Alexander Beaumont Churchill Dixie, 10th Baronet, and widow of Lord Henry Somerset, son of Henry Somerset, 8th Duke of Beaufort. He had a younger brother, Peter, born 1901. The Blagrave family was of Calcot Park in Berkshire, until it was sold by the heir, his father's elder brother, Henry Barry Blagrave.

== Cricket ==
Blagrave made a single first-class appearance for the Gloucestershire County Cricket team, during the 1922 season, against Derbyshire. From the lower order, he scored a duck in the first innings in which he batted, and 12 runs in the second.

== Military activities ==
Blagrave served as a temporary lieutenant in the Royal Artillery.

== Later life ==
Blagrave had some success as an owner and trainer of racehorses, sending out Private Walk to win consecutive editions of the Old Newton Cup. He was also the president of Southampton Football Club.

In 1943, Blagrave married Mrs Gwendoline Sutton, daughter of Thomas Forsyth-Forrest, of the Querns, Cirencester, Gloucestershire. They had no children. In 1964 he bought the manor of Linkenholt in Hampshire, which comprised the manor house, 21 cottages and houses, 1,500 acres of farmland, 450 acres of woodland, a village shop, and a blacksmith's forge. Predeceased by his wife, Blagrave died at his home, The Grange, at Beckhampton near Marlborough. As he had no heir, he established the Herbert and Peter Blagrave Charitable Trust, with orders that the money should be spent on sick children, the elderly, and injured jockeys. Blagrave's property, the trust's main endowment, was sold in 2009 to allowing for diversified investments and increased distribution of grants.
