= Sean Levey =

Swazi jockey (born 1988)

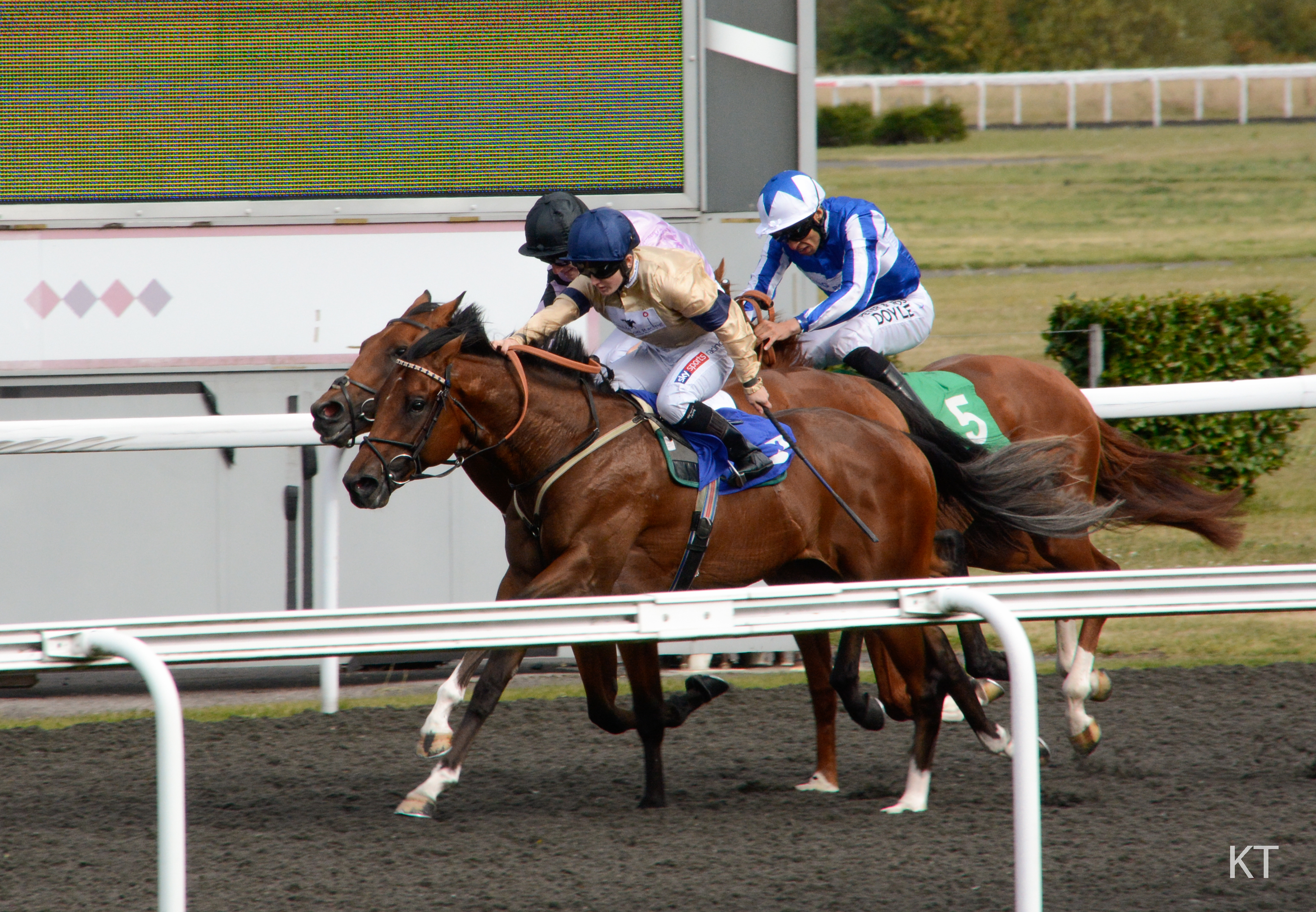
- Levey riding Always Fearless at Kempton Park for owners King Power Racing (blue/white silks)

Personal information
- Born: 7 March 1988 (age 38) Swaziland
- Occupation: Jockey

Horse racing career
- Sport: Horse racing

Major racing wins
- 1000 Guineas Stakes (2018); Sun Chariot Stakes (2019); Queen Elizabeth II Stakes (2019); Falmouth Stakes (2021); Prix Jean Romanet (2022); Prix Jean-Luc Lagardère (2023)

Significant horses
- Billesdon Brook, King of Change, Snow Lantern, Aristia

1000 Guineas (1)
2018
Billesdon Brook	Laurens	Happily

Sean Levey (born 7 March, 1988) is a jockey who competes in flat racing and is based in Britain. He won the 2018 1000 Guineas on Billesdon Brook.

== Early life ==
Levey was born in Swaziland (now Eswatini) to an Irish father, jockey and trainer Mick Levey, and a Swazi mother, Tini. In 2001 the family moved to County Tipperary, Ireland, where his parents worked at Ballydoyle for trainer Aidan O'Brien. Levey rode out for O'Brien and, together with his brother Declan, spent a year on the pony racing circuit.

== Racing career ==
After competing in pony racing, Levey then spent six years as an apprentice jockey with O'Brien at Ballydoyle where he was given the chance to ride pacemakers in Group 1 races, including the Irish Classics and the Prix de l'Arc de Triomphe in France. By the time he left Ireland he had ridden 45 winners including a Group and three Listed victories, but had still not ridden out his claim, due to a lack of opportunities in handicaps.

In 2011 Levey moved to England, first to the stables of David O'Meara near York and then to the stables of Richard Hannon near Marlborough, Wiltshire, where he has remained.

Levey had his first Derby ride in 2016 on Humphrey Bogart, on whom he had won the Lingfield Derby Trial in May. The pair achieved fifth place in the Derby. He won his first Group 1 race in May 2018, when he rode Richard Hannon-trained filly Billesdon Brook to victory in the 1000 Guineas at Newmarket. At 66-1 she was the longest priced winner in the history of the race. Levey said: "It feels great. I've been working a long time to get to this moment and I'm glad it's come. I didn't expect it today. I thought she deserved the chance to be here and run well but to win it the way she did, it wasn't one of my expectations."

In June 2018 Levey sustained a shoulder injury when he was unseated at Salisbury and, following surgery, was unable to ride for the rest of the season.

The 2019 season brought two more Group 1 victories for Levey. In October he won the Sun Chariot Stakes at Newmarket on board Billesdon Brook and the Queen Elizabeth II Stakes at Ascot with King of Change, on whom he had come second in the 2000 Guineas at odds of 66/1. In November Levey had his first ride in the Breeders' Cup at Santa Anita in California, partnering Billesdon Brook in the Filly & Mare Turf. The four-year-old finished in eighth place behind Iridessa

In 2021, Levey achieved another Group 1 success, winning the Falmouth Stakes at Newmarket with Snow Lantern.

In 2022, Levey won his first Group 1 race in France partnering Aristia to victory in the Prix Jean Romanet at Deauville.

In September 2022 Levey was in the lead in the Racing League but missed the final event and was overtaken by Saffie Osborne after a raceday saliva sample tested positive for amphetamine. When a laboratory test on a urine sample came back negative, the British Horseracing Authority cleared Levey of any wrongdoing and decided to suspend its pilot rapid saliva testing programme pending a review.

== Personal life ==
Levey's long-term partner is Toni Vaughan, who works for Retraining of Racehorses. The couple married in May 2023.

== Major wins ==
United Kingdom

- 1000 Guineas Stakes - (1) - Billesdon Brook (2018)
- Sun Chariot Stakes - (1) - Billesdon Brook (2019)
- Queen Elizabeth II Stakes - (1) - King of Change (2019)
- Falmouth Stakes - (1) - Snow Lantern (2021)
- St James's Palace Stakes - (1) - Rosallion (2024)
- St Leger - (1) - Jan Brueghel (2024)

France

- Prix Jean Romanet - (1) - Aristia (2022)
- Prix Jean-Luc Lagardère - (1) - Rosallion (2023)

(Republic of Ireland) Ireland

- Irish 2,000 Guineas – (1) – Rosallion (2024)
