= Marco Botti =

Italian racehorse trainer (born 1976)

Marco Botti (born 23 December 1976) is an Italian racehorse trainer who is based in Great Britain, working from his stable Prestige Place in Newmarket, Suffolk. Botti is the son of Alduino Botti, a champion racehorse trainer in Italy, and worked for trainers Luca Cumani, Ed Dunlop and the Godolphin Racing organisation before becoming a trainer in his own right. Botti's first winner as a trainer came in 2006 and he has become established a successful trainer since then, gaining Group One victories in France, Canada and the United States.

== Major wins ==
Canada

- Canadian International Stakes - (1) - Joshua Tree (2012)
- Natalma Stakes - (1) - Capla Temptress (2017)

France

- Prix du Moulin de Longchamp - (1) - Excelebration (2011)
- Prix Royal-Oak - (2) - Tac De Boistron (2013, 2014)

United States

- Beverly D. Stakes - (1) - Euro Charline (2014)
- Goodwood Stakes - (1) - Gitano Hernando (2009)

Hong Kong

- Hong Kong Vase - (1) - Giavellotto (2024)
