= 2018 British Champions Series =

- Sport: Horse racing
- Duration: 5 May – 20 October 2018

Horse
- Series Champion: Cracksman
- Rating: 130

Jockey
- Series Champion: Frankie Dettori
- Win / 2nd / 3rd: 7 / 4 / 4

Trainer
- Series Champion: John Gosden
- Win / 2nd / 3rd: 11 / 4 / 4

Seasons
- ← 2017 2019 →

The 2018 British Champions Series, sponsored by QIPCO, was the eighth edition of the horse racing series comprising 35 of the UK's top flat races. The series began with the 2,000 Guineas at Newmarket on 5 May, and ended with British Champions Day at Ascot on 20 October.

== Results ==
The series was split into five categories: Sprint, Mile, Middle Distance, Long Distance and Fillies & Mares. Each category included seven races.

=== Sprint ===
Race	Date	Distance	Course	1st	2nd	3rd
King's Stand Stakes	19 June	5 furlongs	Ascot	Blue Point; William Buick – Charlie Appleby	Battaash; Jim Crowley – Charles Hills	Mabs Cross; Paul Mulrennan – Michael Dods
Commonwealth Cup	22 June	6 furlongs	Ascot	Eqtidaar; Jim Crowley – Michael Stoute	Sands Of Mali; Paul Hanagan – Richard Fahey	Emblazoned; Frankie Dettori – John Gosden
Diamond Jubilee Stakes	23 June	6 furlongs	Ascot	Merchant Navy; Ryan Moore – Aidan O'Brien	City Light; Christophe Soumillon – Stéphane Wattel	Bound For Nowhere; Joel Rosario – Wesley Ward
July Cup	14 July	6 furlongs	Newmarket	U S Navy Flag; Ryan Moore – Aidan O'Brien	Brando; Tom Eaves – Kevin Ryan	Fleet Review; Wayne Lordan – Aidan O'Brien
Nunthorpe Stakes	24 August	5 furlongs	York	Alpha Delphini; Graham Lee – Bryan Smart	Mabs Cross; Tom Eaves – Michael Dods	Blue Point; William Buick – Charlie Appleby
Sprint Cup	8 September	6 furlongs	Haydock	The Tin Man; Oisin Murphy – James Fanshawe	Brando; Tom Eaves – Kevin Ryan	Gustav Klimt; Ryan Moore – Aidan O'Brien
British Champions; Sprint Stakes	20 October	6 furlongs	Ascot	Sands Of Mali; Paul Hanagan – Richard Fahey	Harry Angel; Adam Kirby – Clive Cox	Donjuan Triumphant; James Doyle – Andrew Balding

=== Mile ===
Race	Date	Distance	Course	1st	2nd	3rd
2,000 Guineas	5 May	1 mile	Newmarket	Saxon Warrior; Donnacha O'Brien – Aidan O'Brien	Tip Two Win; David Probert – Roger Teal	Masar; William Buick – Charlie Appleby
Lockinge Stakes	19 May	1 mile	Newbury	Rhododendron; Ryan Moore – Aidan O'Brien	Lightning Spear; Oisin Murphy – David Simcock	Lancaster Bomber; Seamie Heffernan – Aidan O'Brien
Queen Anne Stakes	19 June	1 mile	Ascot	Accidental Agent; Charles Bishop – Eve Johnson Houghton	Lord Glitters; Jamie Spencer – David O'Meara	Lightning Spear; Oisin Murphy – David Simcock
St James's Palace Stakes	19 June	1 mile	Ascot	Without Parole; Frankie Dettori – John Gosden	Gustav Klimt; Donnacha O'Brien – Aidan O'Brien	Wootton; Mickael Barzalona – Henri-Alex Pantall
Sussex Stakes	1 August	1 mile	Goodwood	Lightning Spear; Oisin Murphy – David Simcock	Expert Eye; James Doyle – Michael Stoute	Lord Glitters; Daniel Tudhope – David O'Meara
Sun Chariot Stakes	6 October	1 mile	Newmarket	Laurens; Daniel Tudhope – Karl Burke	Happily; Donnacha O'Brien – Aidan O'Brien	Altyn Orda; Silvestre de Sousa – Roger Varian
Queen Elizabeth II Stakes	20 October	1 mile	Ascot	Roaring Lion; Oisin Murphy – John Gosden	I Can Fly; Donnacha O'Brien – Aidan O'Brien	Century Dream; William Buick – Simon Crisford

=== Middle Distance ===
Race	Date	Distance	Course	1st	2nd	3rd
Coronation Cup	1 June	1 mile 4 furlongs	Epsom	Cracksman; Frankie Dettori – John Gosden	Salouen; Silvestre de Sousa – Sylvester Kirk	Windstoss; Adrie de Vries – Markus Klug
Epsom Derby	2 June	1 mile 4 furlongs	Epsom	Masar; William Buick – Charlie Appleby	Dee Ex Bee; Silvestre de Sousa – Mark Johnston	Roaring Lion; Oisin Murphy – John Gosden
Prince of Wales's Stakes	20 June	1 mile 2 furlongs	Ascot	Poet's Word; James Doyle – Michael Stoute	Cracksman; Frankie Dettori – John Gosden	Hawkbill; William Buick – Charlie Appleby
Eclipse Stakes	7 July	1 mile 2 furlongs	Sandown	Roaring Lion; Oisin Murphy – John Gosden	Saxon Warrior; Donnacha O'Brien – Aidan O'Brien	Cliffs Of Moher; Seamie Heffernan – Aidan O'Brien
King George VI & Queen Elizabeth Stakes	28 July	1 mile 4 furlongs	Ascot	Poet's Word; James Doyle – Michael Stoute	Crystal Ocean; William Buick – Michael Stoute	Coronet; Olivier Peslier – John Gosden
International Stakes	22 August	1 mile 2 1/2 furlongs	York	Roaring Lion; Oisin Murphy – John Gosden	Poet's Word; James Doyle – Michael Stoute	Thundering Blue; Fran Berry - David Menuisier
Champion Stakes	20 October	1 mile 2 furlongs	Ascot	Cracksman; Frankie Dettori – John Gosden	Crystal Ocean; William Buick – Michael Stoute	Subway Dancer; Radek Koplík – Zdeno Koplík

=== Long Distance ===
Race	Date	Distance	Course	1st	2nd	3rd
Yorkshire Cup	18 May	1 mile 6 furlongs	York	Stradivarius; Frankie Dettori – John Gosden	Desert Skyline; Silvestre de Sousa – David Elsworth	Call To Mind; William Buick – William Haggas
Ascot Gold Cup	21 June	2 miles 4 furlongs	Ascot	Stradivarius; Frankie Dettori – John Gosden	Vazirabad; Christophe Soumillon – Alain de Royer-Dupré	Torcedor; Colm O'Donoghue – Jessica Harrington
Goodwood Cup	31 July	2 miles	Goodwood	Stradivarius; Andrea Atzeni – John Gosden	Torcedor; Colm O'Donoghue – Jessica Harrington	Idaho; Ryan Moore – Aidan O'Brien
Lonsdale Cup	24 August	2 miles 1/2 furlong	York	Stradivarius; Frankie Dettori – John Gosden	Count Octave; Oisin Murphy – Andrew Balding	Idaho; Ryan Moore – Aidan O'Brien
Doncaster Cup	14 September	2 miles 2 furlongs	Doncaster	Thomas Hobson; Ryan Moore – Willie Mullins	Max Dynamite; Andrea Atzeni - Willie Mullins	Sheikhzayedroad; Martin Harley - David Simcock
St Leger Stakes	15 September	1 mile 6 1/2 furlongs	Doncaster	Kew Gardens; Ryan Moore – Aidan O'Brien	Lah Ti Dar; Frankie Dettori – John Gosden	Southern France; Seamie Heffernan – Aidan O'Brien
British Champions; Long Distance Cup	20 October	2 miles	Ascot	Stradivarius; Frankie Dettori – John Gosden	Thomas Hobson; Oisin Murphy – Willie Mullins	Sir Erec; Donnacha O'Brien – Aidan O'Brien

=== Fillies & Mares ===
Race	Date	Distance	Course	1st	2nd	3rd
1,000 Guineas	6 May	1 mile	Newmarket	Billesdon Brook; Sean Levey – Richard Hannon	Laurens; P. J. McDonald – Karl Burke	Happily; Ryan Moore – Aidan O'Brien
Epsom Oaks	1 June	1 mile 4 furlongs	Epsom	Forever Together; Donnacha O'Brien – Aidan O'Brien	Wild Illusion; William Buick – Charlie Appleby	Bye Bye Baby; Wayne Lordan – Aidan O'Brien
Coronation Stakes	22 June	1 mile	Ascot	Alpha Centauri; Colm O'Donoghue – Jessica Harrington	Threading; William Buick – Mark Johnston	Veracious; Frankie Dettori – Michael Stoute
Falmouth Stakes	13 July	1 mile	Newmarket	Alpha Centauri; Colm O'Donoghue – Jessica Harrington	Altyn Orda; Frankie Dettori – Roger Varian	Clemmie; Ryan Moore – Aidan O'Brien
Nassau Stakes	2 August	1 mile 2 furlongs	Goodwood	Wild Illusion; William Buick – Charlie Appleby	Urban Fox; Daniel Tudhope – William Haggas	Veracious; Frankie Dettori – Michael Stoute
Yorkshire Oaks	23 August	1 mile 4 furlongs	York	Sea Of Class; James Doyle – William Haggas	Coronet; Frankie Dettori – John Gosden	Eziyra; William Buick – Dermot Weld
British Champions; Fillies & Mares Stakes	20 October	1 mile 4 furlongs	Ascot	Magical; Ryan Moore – Aidan O'Brien	Coronet; Olivier Peslier – John Gosden	Lah Ti Dar; Frankie Dettori – John Gosden

== Standings ==
Horses were ranked according to their official BHA performance ratings in British Champions Series races during the season. Jockeys and trainers were ranked according to the number of wins, second places and third places they achieved during the series.

=== Horses ===
Rank	Horse	Rating
1	Cracksman	130
2	Poet's Word	127
2	Roaring Lion	127
4	Crystal Ocean	126
5	Alpha Centauri	122
6	Masar	121
6	Saxon Warrior	121
8	Blue Point	120
8	Kew Gardens	120
8	Stradivarius	120

=== Jockeys ===
Rank	Jockey	Win	2nd	3rd
1	Frankie Dettori	7	4	4
2	Ryan Moore	6	0	5
3	Oisin Murphy	5	3	2
4	William Buick	3	4	6
5	James Doyle	3	2	1
6	Donnacha O'Brien	2	4	1
7	Colm O'Donoghue	2	1	1
8	Daniel Tudhope	1	1	1
9	Andrea Atzeni	1	1	0
9	Jim Crowley	1	1	0
9	Paul Hanagan	1	1	0

=== Trainers ===
Rank	Trainer	Win	2nd	3rd
1	John Gosden	11	4	4
2	Aidan O'Brien	7	4	11
3	Michael Stoute	3	4	2
4	Charlie Appleby	3	1	3
5	Jessica Harrington	2	1	1
6	Willie Mullins	1	2	0
7	David Simcock	1	1	2
8	William Haggas	1	1	1
9	Karl Burke	1	1	0
9	Richard Fahey	1	1	0

== See also ==
- 2018 Breeders' Cup Challenge series
