= 2018 2000 Guineas Stakes =

- 2000 Guineas Stakes
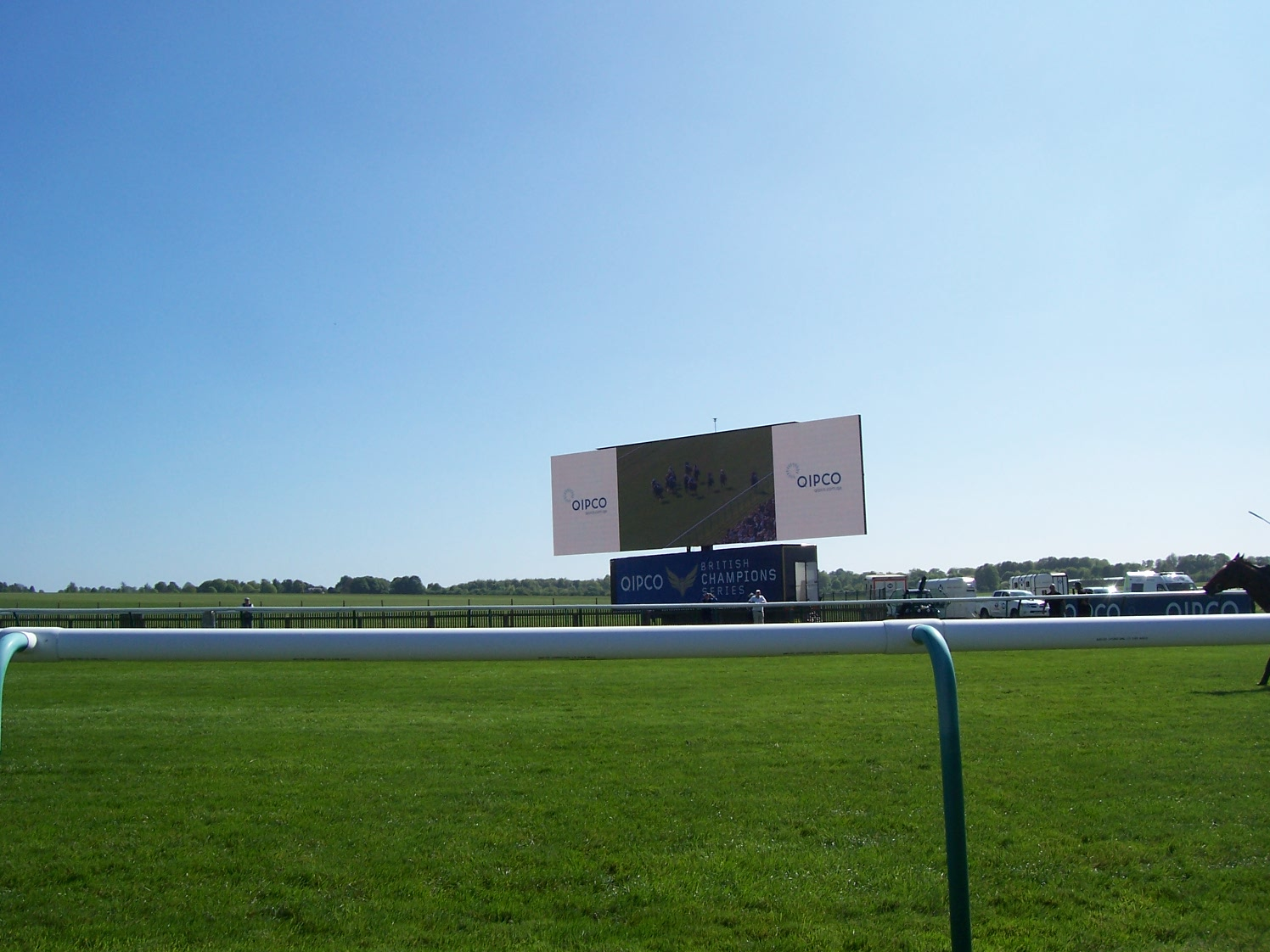
- Saxon Warrior (far right) approaches the finish
- Location: Newmarket Racecourse
- Date: 5 May 2018
- Winning horse: Saxon Warrior
- Starting price: 3/1
- Jockey: Donnacha O'Brien
- Trainer: Aidan O'Brien
- Owner: Derrick Smith, Sue Magnier & Michael Tabor
- Conditions: Good

The 2018 2000 Guineas Stakes was the 210th running of the 2000 Guineas Stakes horse race. It was run over one mile on the Rowley Mile at Newmarket Racecourse on 5 May 2018, a hot and sunny day. The winner was the Japanese bred Saxon Warrior, trained by Aidan O'Brien and ridden by his son Donnacha O'Brien. Tip Two Win was in second place a length and a half behind and the favourite, Masar, was in third place.

== Race details ==
- Sponsor: QIPCO
- Winner's prize money: £283,550
- Going: Good
- Number of runners: 14
- Winner's time: 1 minute, 36.55 seconds

== Full result ==
	Dist *	Horse	Jockey	Trainer	SP
1		Saxon Warrior	Donnacha O'Brien	Aidan O'Brien	3/1
2	1½	Tip Two Win	David Probert	Roger Teal	50/1
3	head	Masar	William Buick	Charlie Appleby	5/2 fav
4	½	Elarqam	Jim Crowley	Mark Johnston	5/1
5	neck	Roaring Lion	Oisin Murphy	John Gosden	14/1
6	1¼	Gustav Klimt	Seamie Heffernan	Aidan O'Brien	4/1
7	½	James Garfield	Frankie Dettori	George Scott	25/1
8	1¼	Raid	Martin Harley	David Simcock	33/1
9	½	Murillo	Wayne Lordan	Aidan O'Brien	40/1
10	3½	Expert Eye	Andrea Atzeni	Sir Michael Stoute	12/1
11	3¼	Cardsharp	James Doyle	Mark Johnston	80/1
12	½	Headway	Jamie Spencer	William Haggas	20/1
13	4	Rajasinghe	Adam Kirby	Richard Spencer	15/1
14	12	Nebo	Silvestre De Sousa	Charles Hills	100/1

* The distances between the horses are shown in lengths. All the runners were three-year-old colts and carried 9 stone.

== Reaction ==
After the race winning jockey Donnacha O'Brien said of Saxon Warrior: "He's a very good horse, he's a proper horse."

== Race build-up ==
The Aidan O'Brien trained colt Gustav Klimt became an early ante-post favourite for the race after winning the Superlative Stakes at Newmarket in July 2017, but after an impressive win in the Vintage Stakes at Glorious Goodwood, Sir Michael Stoute's Expert Eye then took over as the market leader. Stoute stated it was "too early to tell if he's a Guineas horse" but jockey Andrea Atzeni was more positive, saying, "I don’t think I’ve ever sat on a two-year-old as good as this".

== See also ==
- 2018 Epsom Derby
- 2018 British Champions Series
