= 2018 Epsom Derby =

- Epsom Derby
- Location: Epsom Downs Racecourse
- Date: 2 June 2018
- Winning horse: Masar
- Starting price: 16/1
- Jockey: William Buick
- Trainer: Charlie Appleby
- Owner: Godolphin
- Conditions: Good

Epsom Derby 2018
1-2-3
Masar	Dee Ex Bee	Roaring Lion

Also Ran
4-5-6
Saxon Warrior	Hazapour	Delano Roosevelt
7-8-9
Young Rascal	The Pentagon	Kew Gardens
10-11-12
Sevenna Star	Knight To Behold	Zabriskie

The 2018 Epsom Derby was the 239th annual running of the Derby horse race and took place at Epsom Downs Racecourse on 2 June 2018. The winner was Masar, ridden by William Buick, at odds of 16/1. The race was sponsored by Investec and the first prize was £920,000.

== Race synopsis ==
=== Entries and race build-up ===
The initial entry for the 2018 Epsom Derby, announced in December 2016, consisted of 448 yearlings whose owners paid £560 for each horse entered. The number of entries was an increase of 32 on the initial entry for the 2017 race, and included 34 horses from the Godolphin Racing organisation and 58 from the Coolmore Stud. Sheikh Hamdan Al Maktoum entered 31 horses and 2016 winning owner Aga Khan IV had 20 entries. Three fillies were amongst the entries.

Six further horses were added at the second entry stage on 3 April 2018, with their owners paying £9,000 to enter a runner. Amongst the six were Tim Easterby's unbeaten colt Wells Farhh Go, two trained by Hugo Palmer and entries from the stables of Saeed bin Suroor and André Fabre.

At the final entry stage on 31 May 2018 there were 12 runners declared, with Saxon Warrior odds-on favourite.

=== Trial races ===
The first significant trial for the 2018 Derby took place at Leopardstown Racecourse on 14 April when four colts contested the Ballysax Stakes. Three of the four runners were trained by Aidan O'Brien, including the favourite The Pentagon. The race was run on heavy going and was won by another O'Brien runner, Nelson, who beat Delano Roosevelt by half a length. Nelson, ridden by Donnacha O'Brien, was giving the trainer an eighth victory in the race. The Pentagon finished a well-beaten third. Aidan O'Brien said after the race " "I was delighted with that. It was tough going out there and Donnacha was very pleased with Nelson and said he stays really well." and that his other runners would "...probably all come back for the Derrinstown Stud Stakes and they’re all Derby horses."

Epsom staged the Blue Riband Trial Stakes on 25 April. The race offers a free Derby entry to the winner and had been upgraded to Listed status in 2018. John Gosden trained the winner of the race for a sixth time with Crossed Baton, who took an early lead and held on in the final furlong to beat My Lord And Master by a head. The colt was already entered for the Derby and Gosden commented "If we get a hot summer he could be back [for the Derby]...he's a big boy but with not the biggest feet and he flows over faster ground."

On 27 April the Bet365 Classic Trial at Sandown Park produced a second trial winner for John Gosden. Gosden's Sevenna Star beat six other colts in a race run on testing going, getting up close to the winning post to beat Charlie Appleby's Ispolini by a short head. Sevenna Star had won his previous race by 14 lengths. Frankie Dettori, who rode the winner, said "Ultimately you'll see his very best at a mile and a half. He'll get better as the season progresses." Gosden, who was winning the race for the ninth time, felt that " he was only just getting the hang of it in the last part. He could go for another trial, with the Dante Stakes an option."

The 2000 Guineas saw an impressive victory by Saxon Warrior who came home ahead of the outsider Tip Two Win and the favourite Masar whilst Roaring Lion came home fifth. Chester's two Derby trial races saw Young Rascal beat Dee Ex Bee in the Chester Vase on 9 May and the Aidan O'Brien-trained Rostropovich take the Dee Stakes on the following day. The Derrinstown Stud Derby Trial on 13 May produced an upset as a three-horse Ballydoyle entry of The Pentagon, Delano Roosevelt and Nelson was defeated by the Dermot Weld-trained Hazapour, a 16/1 outsider. In the following week York Racecourse staged the Dante Stakes which saw Roaring Lion come home four and a half lengths clear of Mildenberger with Zabriskie in third place. The result effectively ended the Derby hopes of Wells Farhh Go and Crossed Batons who finished sixth and seventh.

== Race card ==
The final field of twelve saw six Irish-trained challengers matched against six British-trained colts.

No	Draw	Horse	Weight (st–lb)	Jockey	Trainer	Owner
1	6	Dee Ex Bee	9–0	Silvestre de Sousa	Mark Johnston	Hamdan bin Mohammed Al-Maktoum
2	4	Delano Roosevelt (IRE)	9–0	Seamie Heffernan	Aidan O'Brien (IRE)	Tabor, Smith, Magnier
3	3	Hazapour (IRE)	9–0	Frankie Dettori	Dermot Weld (IRE)	Aga Khan IV
4	12	Kew Gardens (IRE)	9–0	Donnacha O'Brien	Aidan O'Brien (IRE)	Tabor, Smith, Magnier
5	2	Knight to Behold (IRE)	9–0	Richard Kingscote	Harry Dunlop	Neil Jones
6	10	Masar (IRE)	9–0	William Buick	Charlie Appleby	Godolphin
7	5	Roaring Lion (USA)	9–0	Oisin Murphy	John Gosden	Qatar Racing
8	1	Saxon Warrior (JPN)	9–0	Ryan Moore	Aidan O'Brien (IRE)	Tabor, Smith, Magnier
9	7	Sevenna Star (IRE)	9–0	Robert Havlin	John Gosden	Gestut Ammerland
10	11	The Pentagon (IRE)	9–0	Wayne Lordan	Aidan O'Brien (IRE)	Tabor, Smith, Magnier
11	9	Young Rascal (FR)	9–0	James Doyle	William Haggas	Bernard Kantor
12	8	Zabriskie (IRE)	9–0	Padraig Beggy	Aidan O'Brien (IRE)	Flaxman Stables Ireland Ltd

Trainers are based in Great Britain unless indicated.

== The race ==
Despite fears earlier in the week that the prevailing wet weather would result in a soft surface, the race was run in bright sunshine on ground officially described as good. In the early stages Knight to Behold set the pace from Kew Gardens with Hazapour and The Pentagon close behind. The others were closely grouped and headed by Dee Ex Bee whilst Zabriskie and Sevenna Star brought up the rear. The order remained unchanged until the straight where horses fanned out to deliver their challenges. Approaching the last quarter mile Knight to Behold led a front rank of seven horses which included (from the inside) Kew Gardens, Hazapour, The Pentagon, Dee Ex Bee, Masar and Roaring Lion with Saxon Warrior beginning to make steady progress alongside his stablemate Delano Roosevelt. Knight to Behold, Kew Gardens and The Pentagon quickly dropped away, leaving Hazapour and Dee Ex Bee to briefly dispute the lead before Masar swept past them on the outside a furlong and a half from the finish. Roaring Lion briefly looked like a serious threat in the final furlong but Masar kept on well and won by a length and a half. Dee Ex Bee took second place, half a length in front of Roaring Lion whilst Saxon Warrior stayed on well to deprive Hazapour of fourth place without ever looking likely to win.

== Full result ==
	Dist *	Horse	Jockey	Trainer	SP
1		Masar	William Buick	Charlie Appleby	16/1
2	2	Dee Ex Bee	Silvestre de Sousa	Mark Johnston	20/1
3	½	Roaring Lion	Oisin Murphy	John Gosden	6/1
4	2½	Saxon Warrior	Ryan Moore	Aidan O'Brien	4/5 fav
5	2½	Hazapour	Frankie Dettori	Dermot Weld	12/1
6	4½	Delano Roosevelt	Seamie Heffernan	Aidan O'Brien	16/1
7	5	Young Rascal	James Doyle	William Haggas	17/2
8	½	The Pentagon	Wayne Lordan	Aidan O'Brien	33/1
9	10	Kew Gardens	Donnacha O'Brien	Aidan O'Brien	16/1
10	1	Sevenna Star	Robert Havlin	John Gosden	50/1
11	4½	Knight To Behold	Richard Kingscote	Harry Dunlop	14/1
12	15	Zabriskie	Padraig Beggy	Aidan O'Brien	66/1

* The distances between the horses are shown in lengths or shorter; nse = nose; hd = head.
† Trainers are based in Great Britain unless indicated.

== Form analysis ==
=== Two-year-old races ===
Notable runs by the future Derby participants as two-year-olds in 2017:

- Dee Ex Bee – 2nd in Zetland Stakes, 3rd in Ascendant Stakes
- Delano Roosevelt – 2nd in Beresford Stakes, 3rd in Juvenile Stakes
- Hazapour – 3rd in Eyrefield Stakes
- Kew Gardens – 1st in Zetland Stakes, 2nd in Juvenile Stakes
- Masar – 1st in Solario Stakes, 3rd in Prix Jean-Luc Lagardère, 3rd in Chesham Stakes
- Roaring Lion – 1st in Royal Lodge Stakes, 2nd in Racing Post Trophy
- Saxon Warrior – 1st in Beresford Stakes, 1st in Racing Post Trophy
- The Pentagon – 1st in Tyros Stakes, 3rd in Racing Post Trophy

=== Road to Epsom ===
Early-season appearances in 2018 and trial races prior to running in the Derby:

- Dee Ex Bee – 2nd in Chester Vase, 3rd in Blue Riband Trial Stakes
- Delano Roosevelt – 2nd in Ballysax Stakes, 2nd in Derrinstown Stud Derby Trial
- Hazapour – 1st in Derrinstown Stud Derby Trial
- Kew Gardens – 2nd in Lingfield Derby Trial, 3rd in Feilden Stakes
- Knight to Behold – 1st in Lingfield Derby Trial
- Masar – 1st in Craven Stakes, 3rd in 2000 Guineas
- Roaring Lion – 1st in Dante Stakes, 3rd in Craven Stakes
- Saxon Warrior – 1st in 2000 Guineas
- Sevenna Star – 1st in Sandown Classic Trial
- The Pentagon – 3rd in Ballysax Stakes, 3rd in Derrinstown Stud Derby Trial
- Young Rascal – 1st in Chester Vase
- Zabriskie – 3rd in Dante Stakes

=== Subsequent Group 1 wins ===
Group 1 / Grade I victories after running in the Derby:

- Kew Gardens – Grand Prix de Paris (2018), St Leger (2018)
- Roaring Lion – Eclipse Stakes (2018), International Stakes (2018), Irish Champion Stakes (2018), Queen Elizabeth II Stakes (2018)

== See also ==
- 2018 2000 Guineas Stakes
- 2018 British Champions Series
