= Champions Series =

Champions Series may refer to:

- British Champions Series, the premier races in British flat horse racing
- ISU Grand Prix of Figure Skating, formerly the ISU Champions Series
- Outback Champions Series, Professional tennis events for seniors
