= 2018 Breeders' Cup Challenge series =

Series of horse races

The 2018 Breeders' Cup Challenge series provided winners of the designated races an automatic "Win and You're In" Berth in the 2018 Breeders' Cup, held on November 2 and 3. The Breeders' Cup also pays the entry fee and provides a travel allowance for the connections of the challenge race winners. Races were chosen by the Breeders' Cup organization and included key races in the various Breeders' Cup divisions from around the world.

== Summary ==
On April 18, 2018, the Breeders' Cup announced the 2018 Breeders' Cup Challenge series races. The main change was the addition of four "win and you're in" races from Royal Ascot: the Queen Anne Stakes provides a berth in the Mile division; the Prince of Wales's Stakes (G1) in the Turf; the Norfolk Stakes in the new Juvenile Turf Sprint; and the Diamond Jubilee Stakes in the Turf Sprint. The Jaipur Invitational was also added as a qualifier for the Turf Sprint. The following races were removed from the series: the TJ Smith (Turf Sprint), the Smile Sprint (Sprint), the T. Von Zastrow Stutenpreis (Filly & Mare Turf) and the Grosser Preis von Baden (Turf). On June 25, three more races were added to the challenge series as qualifiers for the Juvenile Turf Sprint. These were the Futurity at Belmont Park, the Indian Summer Stakes at Keeneland and a new race at Santa Anita, subsequently named the Speakeasy Stakes.

A record 221 pre-entries were taken on October 24. Twelve races, including the Classic, were over-subscribed, meaning more than 14 horses (12 in the Juvenile Turf Sprint) wished to enter. Forty-eight of the pre-entries were automatic qualifiers through the Challenge series.

The following automatic qualifiers also won their division of the Breeders' Cup:

- Sistercharlie automatically qualified by winning the Beverley D and went on to win the Filly & Mare Turf
- Accelerate, winner of the Classic, automatically qualified by winning both the Pacific Classic and Awesome Again
- Game Winner qualified by winning the FrontRunner, then won the Juvenile
- Roy H won the Santa Anita Sprint Championship before winning the Sprint
- Jaywalk won both the Frizette and Juvenile Fillies

== Automatic Qualifiers ==
The winners of the 2018 Breeders' Cup Challenge races are shown below. The status column shows whether the horse was subsequently entered in the corresponding Breeders' Cup division and if so, if they won. The status column also shows a few horses that had been sidelined by injury or retired prior to the running of the Breeders' Cup.

Month	Race	Track	Location	Division	Winner	BC Status
January	Paddock Stakes	Kenilworth	South Africa	Breeders' Cup Filly & Mare Turf	Oh Susanna (AUS)	not entered
January	Queen's Plate	Kenilworth	South Africa	Breeders' Cup Mile	Legal Eagle (SAF)	not entered
February	February Stakes	Tokyo	Japan	Breeders' Cup Classic	Nonkono Yume (JPN)	not entered
April	Doncaster Mile	Randwick	Australia	Breeders' Cup Mile	Happy Clapper	not entered
April	Legacy Stakes	Randwick	Australia	Breeders' Cup Filly & Mare Turf	Alizee (AUS)	not entered
May	Gran Premio Criadores	Palermo	Argentina	Breeders' Cup Distaff	Sinfonia Fantastica (ARG)	not entered
May	Gran Premio Club Hipico Falabella	Santiago	Chile	Breeders' Cup Mile	Nuevo Maestro (CHI)	not entered
May	Gran Premio 25 de Mayo	San Isidro	Argentina	Breeders' Cup Turf	La Extrana Dama (ARG)	not entered
May	Shoemaker Mile	Santa Anita	California	Breeders' Cup Mile	Hunt (IRE)	ill
June	Yasuda Kinen	Tokyo	Japan	Breeders' Cup Mile	Mozu Ascot	not entered
June	Ogden Phipps Stakes	Belmont Park	New York	Breeders' Cup Distaff	Abel Tasman	pre-entered
June	Jaipur Invitational Stakes	Belmont Park	New York	Breeders' Cup Turf Sprint	Disco Partner	pre-entered
June	Metropolitan Handicap	Belmont Park	New York	Breeders' Cup Dirt Mile	Bee Jersey	retired due to injury
June	Grande Prêmio Brasil	Hipódromo da Gávea	Brazil	Breeders' Cup Turf	Quarteto De Cordas (BRZ)	pre-entered
June	Stephen Foster Handicap	Churchill Downs	Kentucky	Breeders' Cup Classic	Pavel	pre-entered
June	Fleur de Lis Handicap	Churchill Downs	Kentucky	Breeders' Cup Distaff	Blue Prize (ARG)	pre-entered
June	Queen Anne Stakes	Ascot	England	Breeders' Cup Mile	Accidental Agent (GB)	not entered
June	Prince of Wales's Stakes	Ascot	England	Breeders' Cup Turf	Poet's Word (IRE)	injured
June	Norfolk Stakes	Ascot	England	Breeders' Cup Juvenile Turf Sprint	Shang Shang Shang	pre-entered
June	Diamond Jubilee Stakes	Ascot	England	Breeders' Cup Turf Sprint	Merchant Navy (AUS)	not entered
June	Gran Premio Pamplona	Monterrico	Peru	Breeders' Cup Filly & Mare Turf	Smart Choice (ARG)	pre-entered
June	Takarazuka Kinen	Hanshin	Japan	Breeders' Cup Turf	Mikki Rocket (JPN)	not entered
June	Highlander Stakes	Woodbine	Canada	Breeders' Cup Turf Sprint	Long On Value	not entered
June	Princess Rooney Handicap	Gulfstream Park	Florida	Breeders' Cup Filly & Mare Sprint	Stormy Embrace	pre-entered
July	Belmont Sprint Championship Stakes	Belmont Park	New York	Breeders' Cup Sprint	Limousine Liberal	pre-entered
July	King George VI & Queen Elizabeth Stakes	Ascot	England	Breeders' Cup Turf	Poet's Word (IRE)	injured
July	Bing Crosby Handicap	Del Mar	California	Breeders' Cup Sprint	Ransom the Moon	not entered
July	Haskell Invitational	Monmouth	New Jersey	Breeders' Cup Classic	Good Magic	retired
July	Clement L. Hirsch Stakes	Del Mar	California	Breeders' Cup Distaff	Unique Bella	retired due to injury
August	Sussex Stakes	Goodwood	England	Breeders' Cup Mile	Lightning Spear (GB)	pre-entered
August	Whitney Handicap	Saratoga	New York	Breeders' Cup Classic	Diversify	bypassed
August	Arlington Million	Arlington	Illinois	Breeders' Cup Turf	Robert Bruce (CHI)	pre-entered
August	Beverly D. Stakes	Arlington	Illinois	Breeders' Cup Filly & Mare Turf	Sistercharlie (IRE)	won
August	Prix Jacques le Marois	Deauville	France	Breeders' Cup Mile	Alpha Centauri (IRE)	retired due to injury
August	Pacific Classic	Del Mar	California	Breeders' Cup Classic	Accelerate	won
August	Del Mar Handicap	Del Mar	California	Breeders' Cup Turf	Fashion Business (GB)	not entered
August	Juddmonte International	York	England	Breeders' Cup Turf	Roaring Lion	pre-entered in Classi
August	Yorkshire Oaks	York	England	Breeders' Cup Filly & Mare Turf	Sea of Class (IRE)	not entered
August	Nunthorpe Stakes	York	England	Breeders' Cup Turf Sprint	Alpha Delphini (GB)	not entered
August	Personal Ensign Stakes	Saratoga	New York	Breeders' Cup Distaff	Abel Tasman	pre-entered
August	Ballerina Stakes	Saratoga	New York	Breeders' Cup Filly & Mare Sprint	Marley's Freedom	pre-entered
August	Forego Stakes	Saratoga	New York	Breeders' Cup Sprint	Whitmore	pre-entered
August	Sword Dancer	Saratoga	New York	Breeders' Cup Turf	Glorious Empire (IRE)	pre-entered
August	Pat O'Brien Handicap	Del Mar	California	Breeders' Cup Dirt Mile	Catalina Cruiser	pre-entered
September	Spinaway Stakes	Saratoga	New York	Breeders' Cup Juvenile Fillies	Sippican Harbor	pre-entered
September	Juvenile Stakes	Leopardstown	Ireland	Breeders' Cup Juvenile Turf	Madhmoon (IRE)	not entered
September	Matron Stakes	Leopardstown	Ireland	Breeders' Cup Filly & Mare Turf	Laurens (FR)	bypassed
September	Irish Champion Stakes	Leopardstown	Ireland	Breeders' Cup Turf	Roaring Lion	pre-entered in Classic
September	Iroquois Stakes	Churchill Downs	Kentucky	Breeders' Cup Juvenile	Cairo Cat	not entered
September	Pocahontas Stakes	Churchill Downs	Kentucky	Breeders' Cup Juvenile Fillies	Serengeti Empress	pre-entered
September	Woodbine Mile	Woodbine	Canada	Breeders' Cup Mile	Oscar Performance	pre-entered
September	Moyglare Stud Stakes	Curragh	Ireland	Breeders' Cup Juvenile Fillies Turf	Skitter Scatter	not entered
September	Flying Five Stakes	Curragh	Ireland	Breeders' Cup Turf Sprint	Havana Grey (GB)	pre-entered
September	Natalma Stakes	Woodbine	Canada	Breeders' Cup Juvenile Fillies Turf	La Pelosa (IRE)	pre-entered
September	Summer Stakes	Woodbine	Canada	Breeders' Cup Juvenile Turf	Fog of War	not entered
September	Rockfel Stakes	Newmarket	England	Breeders' Cup Juvenile Fillies Turf	Just Wonderful	pre-entered
September	Royal Lodge Stakes	Newmarket	England	Breeders' Cup Juvenile Turf	Mohawk (IRE)	not entered
September	Vosburgh Stakes	Belmont Park	New York	Breeders' Cup Sprint	Imperial Hint	pre-entered
September	Joe Hirsch Turf Classic Invitational Stakes	Belmont Park	New York	Breeders' Cup Turf	Channel Maker	pre-entered
September	Jockey Club Gold Cup	Belmont Park	New York	Breeders' Cup Classic	Discreet Lover	pre-entered
September	FrontRunner Stakes	Santa Anita	California	Breeders' Cup Juvenile	Game Winner	won
September	Chandelier Stakes	Santa Anita	California	Breeders' Cup Juvenile Fillies	Bellafina	pre-entered
September	Rodeo Drive Stakes	Santa Anita	California	Breeders' Cup Filly & Mare Turf	Vasilika	not entered
September	Awesome Again Stakes	Santa Anita	California	Breeders' Cup Classic	Accelerate	won
September	Sprinters Stakes	Nakayama	Japan	Breeders' Cup Turf Sprint	Fine Needle (JPN)	not entered
September	Zenyatta Stakes	Santa Anita	California	Breeders' Cup Distaff	Vale Dori (ARG)	pre-entered
October	Phoenix Stakes	Keeneland	Kentucky	Breeders' Cup Sprint	Promises Fulfilled	pre-entered
October	Alcibiades Stakes	Keeneland	Kentucky	Breeders' Cup Juvenile Fillies	Restless Rider	pre-entered
October	First Lady Stakes	Keeneland	Kentucky	Breeders' Cup Filly & Mare Turf	A Raving Beauty (GER)	pre-entered
October	Thoroughbred Club of America Stakes	Keeneland	Kentucky	Breeders' Cup Filly & Mare Sprint	Golden Mischief	pre-entered
October	Shadwell Turf Mile Stakes	Keeneland	Kentucky	Breeders' Cup Mile	Next Shares	pre-entered
October	Breeders' Futurity Stakes	Keeneland	Kentucky	Breeders' Cup Juvenile	Knicks Go	pre-entered
October	Champagne Stakes	Belmont Park	New York	Breeders' Cup Juvenile	Complexity	pre-entered
October	Speakeasy Stakes	Santa Anita	California	Breeders' Cup Juvenile Turf Sprint	It's Gonna Hurt	pre-entered
October	Santa Anita Sprint Championship	Santa Anita	California	Breeders' Cup Sprint	Roy H	won
October	Prix de l'Opéra	Longchamp	France	Breeders' Cup Filly & Mare Turf	Wild Illusion	pre-entered
October	Prix Jean-Luc Lagardère	Longchamp	France	Breeders' Cup Juvenile Turf	Royal Marine	not entered
October	Prix Marcel Boussac	Longchamp	France	Breeders' Cup Juvenile Fillies Turf	Lily's Candle (FR)	pre-entered
October	Indian Summer Stakes	Keeneland	Kentucky	Breeders' Cup Juvenile Turf Sprint	Strike Silver	pre-entered
October	Bourbon Stakes	Keeneland	Kentucky	Breeders' Cup Juvenile Turf	Current	pre-entered
October	Spinster Stakes	Keeneland	Kentucky	Breeders' Cup Distaff	Blue Prize	pre-entered
October	Belmont Futurity	Belmont Park	New York	Breeders' Cup Juvenile Turf Sprint	Uncle Benny	pre-entered
October	Frizette Stakes	Belmont Park	New York	Breeders' Cup Juvenile Fillies	Jaywalk	won
October	Flower Bowl	Belmont Park	New York	Breeders' Cup Filly & Mare Turf	Fourstar Crook	pre-entered
October	Jessamine Stakes	Keeneland	Kentucky	Breeders' Cup Juvenile Fillies Turf	Concrete Rose	pre-entered

== See also ==
- 2018 British Champions Series
