= Minstrel Stakes =

Flat horse race in Ireland

- Class: Group 2
- Location: Curragh Racecourse; County Kildare, Ireland
- Race type: Flat / Thoroughbred
- Sponsor: Robert Ng (as Romanised)
- Website: Curragh

Race information
- Distance: 7f (1,408 metres)
- Surface: Turf
- Track: Right-hand elbow
- Qualification: Three-years-old and up
- Weight: 9 st 1 lb (3yo); 9 st 8 lb (4yo+); Allowances; 3 lb for fillies and mares Penalties; 3 lb for G1 winners * * since 1 November last year
- Purse: €111,600 (2022); 1st: €70,800

Minstrel Stakes
2026
Power Blue	Big Gossey	Audience

Previous years
2025
Diego Velazquez	East Hampton	Mutasarref
2024
Poet Master	Lord Massusus	Mutasarref
2022
Order Of Australia	Pearls Galore	Dr Zempf
2021
Order Of Australia	Njord	Power Under Me

2020-2011
2020
Romanised	Lancaster House	Surrounding
2019
Romanised	Hey Gaman	Safe Voyage
2018
Larchmont Lad	So Beloved	Fas
2017
Spirit of Valor	So Beloved	Stormy Antarctic
2016
Gordon Lord Byron	Sovereign Debt	Toscanini
2015
Gordon Lord Byron	Sovereign Debt	Dark Emerald
2014
Ansgar	Darwin	Eastern Rules
2013
Darwin	Gordon Lord Byron	Leitir Mor
2012
Takar	Singing Bird	Among Equals
2011
Across The Rhine	Future Generation	Hujaylea

2010-2001
2010
Air Chief Marshal	Duff	Dandy Boy
2009
Three Rocks	Georgebernardshaw	Mad About You
2008
Jumbajukiba	Al Qasi	Georgebernardshaw
2007
Redstone Dancer	Hard Rock City	Evening Time
2006
Jedburgh	Noelani	Tiger Dance
2005
Caradak	Arakan	Tropical Lady
2004
Trade Fair	One More Round	Millennium Force
2003
Avorado	D'Anjou	Millennium Force
2002
Gateman	One Won One	D'Anjou
2001
King Charlemagne	Mull Of Kintyre	Just Special

2000-1991
2000
Shibl	Mcdab	Saffron Walden
1999
Ramooz	Risque Lady	Lil's Boy
1998
Burden Of Proof	Centre Stalls	Kincara Palace
1997
Ramooz	Burden Of Proof	Eternal Joy
1996
Restructure	Bin Rosie	Rainbow Blues
1995
Hushang	Ivory Frontier	Two O'Clock Jump
1994
Wandering Thoughts	Terrible Confusion	Unusual Heat
1993
Asema	Malvernico	Via Parigi
1992
Via Borghese	Nordic Brief	Millie's Choice
1991
Rimpa	Bold Russian	Jameelaty

The Minstrel Stakes is a Group 2 flat horse race in Ireland open to thoroughbreds aged three years or older. It is run at the Curragh over a distance of 7 furlongs (1,408 metres), and it is scheduled to take place each year in July.

The event is named after The Minstrel, a successful Irish-trained racehorse in the 1970s. It was formerly held at Phoenix Park in late April or early May, and it used to be contested by three-year-olds over a mile. For a period it was classed at Listed level.

The race was transferred to the Curragh and switched to July in 1991, and at this point it was opened to older horses. It was promoted to Group 3 status in 1996, and cut to 7 furlongs in 2001. The minimum age of participating horses was raised to four in 2002, and three-year-olds were re-admitted in 2007. It was upgraded to Group 2 level from the 2016 running.

== Records ==
Most successful horse since 1988 (2 wins):

- Ramooz – 1997, 1999
- Gordon Lord Byron - 2015, 2016
- Romanised - 2019, 2020
- Order of Australia - 2021, 2022

Leading jockey since 1988 (6 wins):

- Michael Kinane – Executive Perk (1988), Twilight Agenda (1989), Go and Go (1990), Asema (1993), King Charlemagne (2001), Caradak (2005)

Leading trainer since 1988 (8 wins):

- Aidan O'Brien - Wandering Thoughts (1994), King Charlemagne (2001), Air Chief Marshal (2010), Darwin (2013), Spirit Of Valor (2017), Order of Australia (2021,2022), Diego Velazquez (2025)

== Winners since 1988 ==
Year	Winner	Age	Jockey	Trainer	Time
1988	Executive Perk	3	Michael Kinane	Dermot Weld	1:43.20
1989	Twilight Agenda	3	Michael Kinane	Dermot Weld	1:49.50
1990	Go and Go	3	Michael Kinane	Dermot Weld	1:38.00
1991	Rimpa	3	Lester Piggott	Vincent O'Brien	1:35.60
1992	Via Borghese	3	Walter Swinburn	Vincent O'Brien	1:40.20
1993	Asema	3	Michael Kinane	Dermot Weld	1:41.00
1994	Wandering Thoughts	5	Christy Roche	Aidan O'Brien	1:43.30
1995	Hushang	5	Johnny Murtagh	John Oxx	1:39.50
1996	Restructure	4	Paul Eddery	Julie Cecil	1:37.60
1997	Ramooz	4	Kieren Fallon	Ben Hanbury	1:38.80
1998	Burden of Proof	6	Johnny Murtagh	Charles O'Brien	1:42.70
1999	Ramooz	6	Jimmy Fortune	Ben Hanbury	1:39.10
2000	Shibl	3	Stephen Craine	Kevin Prendergast	1:36.90
2001	King Charlemagne	3	Michael Kinane	Aidan O'Brien	1:23.80
2002	Gateman	5	Keith Dalgleish	Mark Johnston	1:26.40
2003	Avorado	5	Kevin Manning	Jim Bolger	1:24.80
2004	Trade Fair	4	Richard Hughes	Roger Charlton	1:21.50
2005	Caradak	4	Michael Kinane	John Oxx	1:21.20
2006	Jedburgh	5	Seb Sanders	John Dunlop	1:28.60
2007	Redstone Dancer	5	Pat Shanahan	Sheena Collins	1:32.79
2008	Jumbajukiba	5	Fran Berry	Jessica Harrington	1:26.26
2009	Three Rocks	4	Kevin Manning	Jim Bolger	1:28.61
2010	Air Chief Marshal	3	Johnny Murtagh	Aidan O'Brien	1:23.92
2011	Across the Rhine	5	Pat Shanahan	Tracey Collins	1:27.60
2012	Takar	3	Johnny Murtagh	John Oxx	1:33.08
2013	Darwin	3	Joseph O'Brien	Aidan O'Brien	1:24.08
2014	Ansgar	4	Pat Smullen	Sabrina Harty	1:23.11
2015	Gordon Lord Byron (Note: Home Of The Brave finished first in 2015, but was disqualified after failing a drug test)	7	Wayne Lordan	Tom Hogan	1:25.11
2016	Gordon Lord Byron	8	Billy Lee	Tom Hogan	1:23.30
2017	Spirit Of Valor	3	Ryan Moore	Aidan O'Brien	1:24.56
2018	Larchmont Lad	4	James Doyle	David O'Meara	1:23.63
2019	Romanised	4	Billy Lee	Ken Condon	1:22.07
2020	Romanised	5	Billy Lee	Ken Condon	1:25.88
2021	Order of Australia	4	Ryan Moore	Aidan O'Brien	1:27.28
2022	Order of Australia	5	Ryan Moore	Aidan O'Brien	1:25.24
2023	Zarinsk (Note: The 2023 race was run at Leopardstown after the original Curragh fixture was abandoned due to heavy rainfall)	3	Colin Keane	Ger Lyons	1:30.45
2024	Poet Master	4	Sam James	Karl Burke	1:23.74
2025	Diego Velazquez	4	Ryan Moore	Aidan O'Brien	1:28.27
2026	Power Blue	3	Rossa Ryan	Robson De Aguiar	1:22.78

== See also ==
- Horse racing in Ireland
- List of Irish flat horse races
