= Romanised (horse) =

Irish Thoroughbred racehorse

- Sire: Holy Roman Emperor
- Grandsire: Danehill
- Dam: Romantic Venture
- Damsire: Indian Ridge
- Sex: Stallion
- Foaled: 5 February 2015
- Country: Ireland
- Colour: Bay
- Breeder: Monica Aherne
- Owner: Robert Ng
- Trainer: Ken Condon
- Record: 20: 5-2-1
- Earnings: £1,031,587

Major wins
- Irish 2,000 Guineas (2018); Minstrel Stakes (2019, 2020); Prix Jacques Le Marois (2019)

Romanised (foaled 5 February 2015) is an Irish Thoroughbred racehorse. As a juvenile in 2017 he won one of his four races and finished second in the Solario Stakes. In the following year he recorded an upset victory in the Irish 2,000 Guineas and finished unplaced in his other starts. As a four-year-old he won the Minstrel Stakes and the Prix Jacques Le Marois and was narrowly beaten in a controversial race for the Prix du Moulin. He won a second Minstrel Stakes in 2020.

== Background ==
Romanised is a bay horse with a white star and three white socks bred by the Aherne family (mother Monica and her sons Gerry, Mikey and P.J.) at the Prospect Stables in County Tipperary. He was sold when only a week old foal to the bloodstock agent John McCormack. The colt entered the ownership of the Singaporean businessman Charles Ng and was sent into training with Ken Condon at the Osborne Lodge Stable, The Curragh, County Kildare.

He was from the eighth crop of foals sired by Holy Roman Emperor, one of the leading European two-year-olds of his generation, who unusually began his stud career as a three-year-old. The best of his other progeny have included Homecoming Queen, Mongolian Khan and Designs On Rome. Romanised's dam Romantic Venture had a very brief racing career, winning a maiden race on her racecourse debut and finishing unplaced in the Matron Stakes on her only subsequent start. Romantic Venture was a half-sister to Designs of Rome and closely related to Grey Swallow.

== Racing career ==
=== 2017: two-year-old season ===
Romanised was ridden by Shane Foley in all but one of his races as a two-year-old. The colt made his racecourse debut in a maiden race over six furlongs at Navan Racecourse on 24 April and started a 14/1 outsider in an eighteen-runner field. He started slowly but stayed on strongly in the closing stages to win by half a length from the Jessica Harrington-trained Brick By Brick. The colt was then stepped up sharply in class when he was sent to England to contest the Group 2 Coventry Stakes at Royal Ascot and finished seventh, beaten two and a quarter lengths by the winner Rajasinghe after struggling to obtain a clear run in the last quarter mile. On 13 August Romanised was ridden by Pat Smullen when he started the 8/1 fourth choice in the betting for the Group 1 Phoenix Stakes at the Curragh. After being restrained at the rear of the field he made some progress in the closing stages but never looked likely to win and came home sixth behind the Aidan O'Brien-trained Sioux Nation. Romanised was then sent to England for a second time for the Group 3 Solario Stakes over seven furlongs at Sandown Park on 2 September and finished second to Masar, beaten two lengths by the winner.

=== 2018: three-year-old season ===
Foley rode Romanised in all of his 2018 starts. The colt made his debut on 7 May in the Listed Tetrarch Stakes at Naas Racecourse in which he encountered trouble in running before finishing sixth behind the Dermot Weld-trained Imaging. Nineteen days later the colt was stepped up to the highest class for the Irish 2000 Guineas at the Curragh and went off a 25/1 outsider in an eleven-runner field. The British-trained Elarqam (fourth in the 2000 Guineas) started favourite ahead of U S Navy Flag, while the other contenders included Gustav Klimt (Superlative Stakes) and Zihba (Amethyst Stakes). Romanised raced at the rear of the field before making steady progress after switching to the outside in the straight. He overtook U S Navy Flag 100 metres from the finish and kept on well to win by two and a quarter lengths. Ken Condon, who had not trained a winner since July 2017, said "It's the stuff of dreams. We’ve been struggling just even to get a winner. But we knew he was a lovely horse. You can have a horse and you like him but sure, who are we to like a horse? How are you going to take on the might of Godolphin and Ballydoyle? I knew we were a longshot coming in here but I felt he was going to run a big race. He's always shown talent and just seems to have come to himself."

In June Romanised was sent to England and started the 6/1 third choice for the St James's Palace Stakes at Royal Ascot but was never able to challenge the leaders and came home seventh of the ten runners behind Without Parole, beaten more than six lengths by the winner. On 12 August at Deauville Racecourse in France, the colt was matched against older horses for the first time in the Group 1 Prix Jacques Le Marois. He raced closer to the lead than usual but was outpaced in the closing stages and finished fifth behind Alpha Centauri. On his final start of the year Romanised was a 40/1 outsider when he finished ninth of eleven runners behind Roaring Lion in the Queen Elizabeth II Stakes at Ascot on 20 October.

=== 2019: four-year-old season ===
In 2019 and 2020 Romanised was ridden in all of his races by Billy Lee. He began his third campaign by finishing fifth to Imaging in the Gladness Stakes over seven furlongs at Naas on 13 April beaten less than two lengths by the winner. The colt was then sent to England for the Group 1 Lockinge Stakes at Newbury Racecourse on 18 May and came home fourth of the fourteen runners behind Mustashry, Laurens and Accidental Agent. In the Queen Anne Stakes at Royal Ascot on 18 June Romanised started a 25/1 outsider but belied his odds as he overcame repeated problems in attempting to obtain a clear run to finish a close fourth behind Lord Glitters, Beat The Bank and One Master. On 20 July Romanised was dropped back in distance and class for the Group 2 Minstrel Stakes over seven furlongs at the Curragh and started the 2/1 second favourite behind the British-trained Hey Gaman (Prix du Palais-Royal). All The King's Men led from the start before giving way to Hey Gaman but Romanised, who had raced in mid-division for most of the way, overtook the favourite inside the final furlong and won by a length to record his first victory in over a year. After the race Condon commented "Billy was delighted with him and said when the gap came he quickened up very smartly. He said when he got to the front he was always just doing enough. He's gone very professional this year, more relaxed and easier to deal with. I thought it was a lovely performance."

On 11 August at Deauville Romanised ran for the second time in the Prix Jacques Le Marois and started at odds of 7/2 in an eight-runner field. The three-year-old filly Watch Me started favourite while the other fancied contenders included Study of Man, Shaman (runner-up in the Poule d'Essai des Poulains) and Line of Duty (Breeders' Cup Juvenile Turf). Romanised settled in fifth place as his pacemaker Success Days disputed the early lead with Vocal Music before making a forward move 400 metres from the finish. Shaman went to the front 300 metres out but Romanised gained the advantage 120 metres from the finish and won "readily" by a length and a quarter. Ken Condon said "There's nothing like winning a Classic, but I've been watching racing since I was knee-high to a grasshopper and I've been very much aware of the history and prestige of this race. To get his name on the roll of honour means an awful lot. He was very impressive and it was great to see... he's more mature this season, he seems to be improving and I'd say that might be a career-best."

At Longchamp Racecourse on 8 September Romanised was made the 3.2/1 favourite for the Prix du Moulin. After racing in mid-division he took the lead approaching the last 200 metres but was overtaken in the closing stages and beaten a nose by Circus Maximus after being impeded as the winner hung to the left in the closing stages. After an inquiry by the racecourse stewards the result was allowed to stand. Ken Condon stated that his trainee's owner Robert Ng was lodging an appeal commenting "He's a great sportsman but thinks it's a pretty cut and dried case. To be fair to the horse, to his record and career, that's what's going to happen". On 19 September an appeal panel upheld the original decision. Ng's racing manager Rupert Pritchard-Gordon said "It's a little disappointing but ultimately it's their decision. Everyone has their own opinion, we thought we had a very good case... The decision didn't go our way but we felt it was worth a try."

=== 2020: five-year-old season ===
The 2020 flat racing season in Britain and Ireland was disrupted by the COVID-19 with many races being cancelled or rescheduled before racing resumed behind closed doors in June. Romanised made his first appearance of the year in the Minstrel Stakes on 18 July and started the 9/4 second favourite behind the Gladness Stakes winner Lancaster House. After racing in third place he overcame some problems in running before overtaking the front-running favourite just inside the final furlong and drawing ahead in the closing stages to win by one and three quarter lengths. Condon felt that the ground was softer than ideal for the horse but said "It's lovely to see him back. We were anxious to start him on his own doorstep and what better place than here in a race he's won before and obviously he has good form here. I'm delighted with that... He had a blow too, but it's important after being out for so long as there is no substitute for a match, you can do all the training you like."

In August Romanised attempted to repeat his 2019 success in the Prix Jacques le Marois but despite making some progress from the rear of the field in the last 400 metres he never looked to be a serious threat and came home fifth of the seven runners behind Palace Pier. In the following month he contested the Prix du Moulin again but was never in contention and finished last of the six runners. After a break of over two months the horse was dropped in class for a minor race on the Polytrack surface at Dundalk Stadium in November when he started odds on favourite but after taking the lead and looking the likely winner he was overtaken in the closing stages and finished third. On his final appearance Romanised was sent to contest the Hong Kong Mile at Sha Tin Racecourse on 13 December. Starting a 118/1 outsider he never recovered from a poor start and finished last of te sixteen runners behind Golden Sixty.

Six days after his run in Hong Kong it was announced that Romanised had been retired from racing. Condon commented "From when he first commenced fast work in the spring of his two-year-old year, Romanised showed that precocity, speed and class that were the hallmarks of his racing career. His biggest attributes were his superior cruising speed and an electric turn of foot."

== Stud career ==
Romanised began his career as a breeding stallion at Haras de Bouquetot near Clarbec in Normandy, standing at a fee of €7,000.

== Pedigree ==
Pedigree of Romanised (IRE), bay stallion 2015
Sire Holy Roman Emperor (IRE) 2004	Danehill (USA); 1986	Danzig	Northern Dancer (CAN)
Sire Holy Roman Emperor (IRE) 2004	Danehill (USA); 1986	Danzig	Pas de Nom
Sire Holy Roman Emperor (IRE) 2004	Danehill (USA); 1986	Razyana	His Majesty
Sire Holy Roman Emperor (IRE) 2004	Danehill (USA); 1986	Razyana	Spring Adieu (CAN)
Sire Holy Roman Emperor (IRE) 2004	L'On Vite (USA); 1986	Secretariat	Bold Ruler
Sire Holy Roman Emperor (IRE) 2004	L'On Vite (USA); 1986	Secretariat	Somethingroyal
Sire Holy Roman Emperor (IRE) 2004	L'On Vite (USA); 1986	Fanfreluche (CAN)	Northern Dancer
Sire Holy Roman Emperor (IRE) 2004	L'On Vite (USA); 1986	Fanfreluche (CAN)	Ciboulette
Dam Romantic Venture (IRE) 1997	Indian Ridge (IRE); 1985	Ahonoora (GB)	Lorenzaccio
Dam Romantic Venture (IRE) 1997	Indian Ridge (IRE); 1985	Ahonoora (GB)	Helen Nichols
Dam Romantic Venture (IRE) 1997	Indian Ridge (IRE); 1985	Hillbrow (GB)	Swing Easy (USA)
Dam Romantic Venture (IRE) 1997	Indian Ridge (IRE); 1985	Hillbrow (GB)	Golden City
Dam Romantic Venture (IRE) 1997	Summer Trysting (USA); 1992	Alleged	Hoist The Flag
Dam Romantic Venture (IRE) 1997	Summer Trysting (USA); 1992	Alleged	Princess Pout
Dam Romantic Venture (IRE) 1997	Summer Trysting (USA); 1992	Seasonal Pickup	The Minstrel (CAN)
Dam Romantic Venture (IRE) 1997	Summer Trysting (USA); 1992	Seasonal Pickup	Bubinka (Family: 8-f)

- Romanised is inbred 4 × 4 to Northern Dancer, meaning that this stallion appears twice in the fourth generation of his pedigree.
