= Without Parole =

British-bred Thoroughbred racehorse

- Racing silks of John Gunther & Tanya Gunther
- Sire: Frankel
- Grandsire: Galileo
- Dam: Without You Babe
- Damsire: Lemon Drop Kid
- Sex: Stallion
- Foaled: 20 March 2015
- Country: United Kingdom
- Colour: Bay
- Breeder: John Gunther
- Owner: John Gunther & Tanya Gunther
- Trainer: John Gosden; Chad Brown
- Record: 15: 4-0-3
- Earnings: £738,387

Major wins
- Heron Stakes (2018); St James's Palace Stakes (2018)

Without Parole, (foaled 20 March 2015) is a retired British-bred Thoroughbred racehorse and breeding stallion. After showing promise when winning his only start as a two-year-old he progressed in the following spring, following a win in a minor race by taking the Heron Stakes and then recording his biggest win in the St James's Palace Stakes. He finished unplaced in his three subsequent starts that year. He was later sent to race in the United States where he failed to win but was placed in the Breeders' Cup Mile, Shoemaker Mile Stakes and Shadwell Turf Mile Stakes.

== Background ==
Without Parole is a bay horse with a white star bred in England by the Kentucky-based John D. Gunther, best known as the breeder of Justify. In October 2016 the yearling was offered for sale at Tattersalls but failed to reach his reserve price of 650,000 guineas. The colt was sent into training with John Gosden at Newmarket, Suffolk and competed in the ownership of Gunther and his daughter Tanya.

He was from the second crop of foals sired by Frankel, an undefeated racehorse whose other progeny have included Cracksman and Soul Stirring. Without Parole's dam Without You Babe never raced but became a very successful broodmare who also produced Tamarkuz. She was a female-line descendant of Equal Venture, a full-sister to Assault.

== Racing career ==
=== 2017: two-year-old season ===
Without Parole made his racecourse debut when he started the 8/13 favourite for a minor race over one mile on the synthetic Tapeta track at Newcastle Racecourse on 16 December. Ridden by Robert Havlin he took the lead approaching the final furlong and accelerated away from his six opponent to win by six lengths.

=== 2018: three-year-old season ===
Plans to train Without Parole for the 2000 Guineas were abandoned after he developed a foot abscess in early spring. On his first appearance of 2018 Without Parole was partnered by Frankie Dettori in a minor event over a mile at Yarmouth Racecourse on 24 April and was made the 4/9 favourite in an eleven-runner field. He went to the front a furlong out and drew away to win by six lengths from Ostilio, a colt who went on to win the Britannia Stakes and the Prix Daniel Wildenstein. A month later, with Dettori again in the saddle, the colt was stepped up in class to contest the Listed Heron Stakes at Sandown Park and was made the 6/4 favourite with the best of his seven rivals appearing to be Gabr and Stephensons Rocket. After tracking the leaders he made progress in the straight, gained the advantage in the closing stages and held off the challenge of Gabr by three quarters of a length.

The Group 1 St James's Palace Stakes at Royal Ascot on 19 June attracted a field of ten three-year-old colts and saw Without Parole head the betting on 9/4. His opponents included U S Navy Flag, Tip Two Win (runner-up in the 2000 Guineas), Romanised (Irish 2,000 Guineas), Gustav Klimt (Superlative Stakes), Wootton (Prix de Fontainebleau) and Gabr. Without Parole raced just behind the leaders as U S Navy Flag set the pace before moving into second place in the straight. He was sent into the lead by Dettori a furlong out, opened up a two length lead and kept on well to win by half a length from the fast-finishing Gustav Klimt. Gosden commented "Without Parole is a grand horse. There were no hiding places in that race. It was proper, proper group 1 pace. I think he is still on the up and still learning... He's so lazy at home. I've never seen a horse eat and sleep like it, which is a great, great thing in a racehorse. I think he will improve. He'll get sharper and I think he will get a little farther, too." Frankie Dettori received a seven-day riding ban and a fine of £4,300 for excessive use of the whip in the closing stages.

On 1 August at Goodwood Racecourse Without Parole was matched against older horses for the first time in the Sussex Stakes and was made the 7/4 favourite to continue his unbeaten run. Ridden by Andrea Atzeni he pulled his way to an early lead but faded in the straight to finish seventh of the eight runners behind Lightning Spear. Three weeks later the colt was reunited with Dettori and stepped up in trip for the International Stakes over 10 1/2 furlongs at York Racecourse and cam home sixth in a race won by Roaring Lion. On 9 September the colt was sent to France for the Prix du Moulin at Longchamp Racecourse. He never looked likely to win and finished sixth to Recoletos, beaten 2 3/4 lengths by the winner.

In the 2018 World's Best Racehorse Rankings Without Parole was given a rating of 116, making him the 169th best horse in the world.

=== 2019: four-year-old season ===
For his first run of 2019 Without Parole was sent to the United Arab Emirates to contest the Dubai Turf over 1800 metres at Meydan Racecourse. He raced in second place before fading in the straight to finish fifth behind Almond Eye, Vivlos, Lord Glitters and Deirdre. On his return to Europe he started the 7/1 fourth choice in the betting for the Lockinge Stakes at Newbury Racecourse on 18 May but after racing in mid-division he appeared to lose his action and dropped away rapidly and finished tailed off last of the fourteen runners.

In the autumn of 2019 Without Parole was transferred to the stable of Chad C. Brown to pursue his track career in the United States. He made his debut for his new trainer in the Breeders' Cup Mile at Santa Anita Park on 2 November when he was ridden by Irad Ortiz Jr. After being restrained towards the rear of the thirteen-runner field he produce a strong late run on the outside to finish third behind Uni and Got Stormy.

=== 2020: five-year-old season ===
On his first run of 2020 Without Parole started favourite for the Pegasus World Cup Turf at Gulfstream Park on 25 January but came home eleventh of the twelve runners behind Zulu Alpha after encountering trouble in running. After a break of five months he returned to the track at Santa Anita Park on 26 May and ran third behind Raging Bull when favourite Shoemaker Mile Stakes. Later that summer he finished fourth to War of Will in the Maker's Mark Mile Stakes at Keeneland and sixth to Halladay in the Fourstardave Handicap at Saratoga Race Course. On his final racecourse appearance, Without Parole finished third behind Ivar and Raging Bull in the Shadwell Turf Mile Stakes at Keeneland on 3 October.

On 22 October it was announced that Without Parole had been retired from racing. John Gunther commented: "Without Parole gave me the most memorable and exciting day of my life with victory in the St James's Palace Stakes at Royal Ascot... I continue to be overwhelmed by the heart and perseverance he has shown with his racing pursuits in America. He has raced in 12 consecutive grade 1s and faced myriad traffic obstructions, at times unsuitable turf conditions, and he just never gives up."

== Stud career ==
At the end of his racing career, Without Parole returned to his birthplace to begin his career as a breeding stallion at Newsells Park.

== Pedigree ==
Pedigree of Without Parole (GB), bay horse, 2015
Sire Frankel (GB) 2008	Galileo (IRE); 1998	Sadler's Wells (USA)	Northern Dancer (CAN)
Sire Frankel (GB) 2008	Galileo (IRE); 1998	Sadler's Wells (USA)	Fairy Bridge
Sire Frankel (GB) 2008	Galileo (IRE); 1998	Urban Sea (USA)	Miswaki
Sire Frankel (GB) 2008	Galileo (IRE); 1998	Urban Sea (USA)	Allegretta (GB)
Sire Frankel (GB) 2008	Kind (IRE); 2001	Danehill (USA)	Danzig
Sire Frankel (GB) 2008	Kind (IRE); 2001	Danehill (USA)	Razyana
Sire Frankel (GB) 2008	Kind (IRE); 2001	Rainbow Lake (GB)	Rainbow Quest (USA)
Sire Frankel (GB) 2008	Kind (IRE); 2001	Rainbow Lake (GB)	Rockfest (USA)
Dam Without You Babe (USA) 2005	Lemon Drop Kid; 1996	Kingmambo	Mr. Prospector
Dam Without You Babe (USA) 2005	Lemon Drop Kid; 1996	Kingmambo	Miesque
Dam Without You Babe (USA) 2005	Lemon Drop Kid; 1996	Charming Lassie	Seattle Slew
Dam Without You Babe (USA) 2005	Lemon Drop Kid; 1996	Charming Lassie	Lassie Dear
Dam Without You Babe (USA) 2005	Marozia; 1994	Storm Bird (CAN)	Northern Dancer (CAN)
Dam Without You Babe (USA) 2005	Marozia; 1994	Storm Bird (CAN)	South Ocean
Dam Without You Babe (USA) 2005	Marozia; 1994	Make Change	Roberto
Dam Without You Babe (USA) 2005	Marozia; 1994	Make Change	Equal Change (Family: 4-c)

- Without Parole was inbred 4 × 4 to Northern Dancer, meaning that this stallion appears twice in the fourth generation of his pedigree.
