= Lightning Spear =

British-bred Thoroughbred racehorse

- Sire: Pivotal
- Grandsire: Polar Falcon
- Dam: Atlantic Destiny
- Damsire: Royal Academy
- Sex: Stallion
- Foaled: 5 April 2011
- Country: United Kingdom
- Colour: Chestnut
- Breeder: Newsells Park Stud
- Owner: Qatar Racing
- Trainer: Ralph Beckett; Olly Stevens; David Simcock
- Record: 27: 7-3-5
- Earnings: £1,371,304

Major wins
- Celebration Mile (2016, 2017); Sussex Stakes (2018)

Lightning Spear, (foaled 5 April 2011) is a British Thoroughbred racehorse and sire. He was lightly campaigned in his early career but eventually developed into a top class miler who won the Celebration Mile in 2016 and 2017 and recorded his biggest victory at the age of seven when he took the Sussex Stakes. He was also placed in numerous top-class races including the Queen Anne Stakes, Queen Elizabeth II Stakes and Lockinge Stakes. Lightning Spear was retired from racing to become a breeding stallion.

== Background ==
Lightning Spear is a chestnut horse standing 16.1 hands high bred in England by the Hertfordshire-based Newsells Park Stud. As a yearling in October the colt was put up for auction at Tattersalls and was bought for 260,000 guineas by David Redvers Bloodstock on behalf of Fahad Al Thani's Qatar Racing. He was sent into training with Ralph Beckett at Kimpton, Hampshire.

His sire Pivotal was a top class sprinter who won the King's Stand Stakes and the Nunthorpe Stakes in 1996. He went on to become an “excellent” sire, getting the winners of more than a thousand races across a range of distances including Sariska, Somnus, Farhh, Kyllachy and Immortal Verse. Lightning Spear's dam Atlantic Destiny showed good form as a two-year-old in England when she won the Sirenia Stakes but had little subsequent success on the track. Her grand-dam Treat Me Nobly was a half-sister to Be My Guest and closely related to Golden Fleece.

== Racing career ==
=== 2013 & 2014: early career ===
On his first and only run as a juvenile, Lightning Spear started at odds of 11/4 in a thirteen-runner maiden race on the synthetic polytrack surface at Kempton Park Racecourse on 29 August. Ridden by Jamie Spencer he tracked the leaders before accelerating to gain the advantage inside the final furlong and won "readily" by three quarters of a length from Alpine Retreat.

For his second season, Lightning Spear was transferred to the stable of Olly Stevens at Chiddingfold in Surrey. After an absence of well over a year the colt returned on 29 October for a minor handicap race over eight and a half furlongs at Nottingham Racecourse. With Jim Crowley in the saddle he took the lead approaching the final furlong and won by one and a quarter lengths from the four-year-old Artful Prince to whom he was conceding nine pounds in weight.

=== 2015: four-year-old season ===
Lightning Spear began his third campaign in a one-mile handicap race on the polytrack at Lingfield Park on 29 April in which he was ridden by Jim Crowley and finished strongly to win by half a length from Sacred Act. After a break of two months he carried top weight of 136 pounds in a similar event at Salisbury Racecourse and extended his unbeaten record, coming home two lengths clear of his nine opponents. In this race he was partnered by Oisin Murphy, who became his regular jockey.

In July Lightning Spear was stepped up sharply in class for the Group 2 Summer Mile Stakes and Ascot Racecourse and sustained his first defeat as he finished second behind the favourite Arod, who was also owned by Qatar Racing. In the following month he was sent to Deauville Racecourse in France for the Group 1 Prix Jacques le Marois and came home fourth behind Esoterique with Toormore, Belardo and Karakontie finishing behind. In the Boomerang Stakes at Leopardstown Racecourse in Ireland he started the 7/4 favourite but was beaten into third behind Custom Cut and Top Notch Tonto. On his final run of the year he was stepped up in distance for the ten furlong Champion Stakes at Ascot in October but made no impact and finished tailed off at the rear of the field.

Olly Stevens retired from training at the end of the year and Lighting Spear moved to the yard of David Simcock in Newmarket, Suffolk.

In the 2015 World's Best Racehorse Rankings Lighting Spear was given a rating of 115, making him the 205th best racehorse in the world.

=== 2016: five-year-old season ===
On his first appearance of 2016 Lightning Spear started a 20/1 outsider for the Queen Anne Stakes at Royal Ascot in June and exceeded expectations as he finished a close third behind the American mare Tepin. In the Sussex Stakes at Goodwood Racecourse in July he was restrained towards the rear of the field and made some progress in the straight but never looked likely to win and came home sixth of the ten runners in a race which saw The Gurkha win from Galileo Gold and Ribchester. At Deauville on 14 August the horse ran for the second time in the Prix Jacques le Marois but was never in serious contention and finished unplaced behind Ribchester.

Thirteen days after his run in France Lightning Spear was dropped back to Group 2 class for the Celebration Mile at Goodwood and started at odds of 4/1 in a five-runner field. The Thoroughbred Stakes winner Thikriyaat headed the betting with the other starters being Toormore, Arod and Zonderland (Sovereign Stakes). He raced towards the rear of the field, and despite briefly struggling to obtain a clear run in the straight he produced a strong late run, took the lead in the closing stages and won by one and three quarter lengths from Zonderland. David Simcock said "he's a very talented horse and he hadn't been able to produce for one reason or another. I've always said he's good, and I think he'll show his true potential next year. His turn of foot is something we've seen at home. We’ve always said he's the best miler we've had, and I'm just really relieved".

Lighting Spear ended his season in the Queen Elizabeth II Stakes in which he came from the rear of the field to finish third of the thirteen runners behind Minding and Ribchester.

Lighting Spear was given a rating of 120 in the 2016 World's Best Racehorse Rankings, making him the 34th best racehorse in the world.

=== 2017: six-year-old season ===
Lightning Spear made his first appearance as a six-year-old in the Lockinge Stakes at Newbury Racecourse on 29 May in which he proved no match for Ribchester but finished clear of the other six runners in second place. He finished unplaced in his next two starts, coming home ninth to Ribchester in the Queen Anne Stakes, and seventh behind Ulysses in the Eclipse Stakes over ten furlongs at Sandown Park on 8 July. The horse contested his second Sussex Stakes on 2 August and finished a close third behind the 20/1 outsider Here Comes When and the odds-on favourite Ribchester.

On 26 August Lightning Spear attempted to repeat his 2016 victory in the Celebration Mile and started favourite ahead of Zonderland with the other four runners being Hathal (Superior Mile), Richard Pankhurst (Hungerford Stakes), Oh This Is Us (Spring Trophy) and Opal Tiara (Balanchine). After racing towards the rear of the field, Lightning Spear produced a strong late run in the straight and caught Zonderland on the line to win by a nose. Murphy commented: "I made no secret about how tactical the race was going to be. It was impossible to know what was going to happen, but you have to have confidence you have chosen to do the right thing and thankfully I just about got it right... It was a good performance today".

On his two remaining starts in Europe that year, Lightning Spear ran sixth to Ribchester in the Prix du Moulin at Chantilly Racecourse in September and sixth again behind the filly Persuasive in the Queen Elizabeth Stakes in October. In December he started a 139/1 outsider for the Hong Kong Mile at Sha Tin Racecourse and came home tenth of the fourteen runners behind Beauty Generation.

In the 2017 World's Best Racehorse Rankings Lighting Spear was given a rating of 115, making him the 237th best racehorse in the world.

=== 2018: seven-year-old season ===
As in 2017, Lightning Spear began his campaign in the Lockinge Stakes at Newbury and started a 16/1 outsider. He took the lead approaching the final furlong and looked likely to win but was caught on the line and beaten a short head by the filly Rhododendron. At Royal Ascot in June he ran for the third time in the Queen Anne Stakes and again ran well in defeat as he was beaten less than a length by the outsiders Accidental Agent and Lord Glitters.

On 1 August Lightning Spear ran for the sixteenth time in a Group 1 race when he contested his third Sussex Stakes at Goodwood. Without Parole started favourite ahead of Expert Eye, Beat The Bank (Summer Mile) and Gustav Klimt (Superlative Stakes), with Lightning Spear fifth in the betting on 9/1. The other three runners were Lord Glitters, Orbaan (Prix de Saint-Patrick) and So Beloved (Spring Trophy). Murphy restrained the horse in fourth place in the early stages as Without Parole set a steady pace before making a forward move in the straight. After looking unlikely to get a clear run he accelerated through a gap between horses, took the lead inside the final furlong and won by a length and a half from Expert Eye. After the race Simcock commented "That’s the horse we see at home quite often and it all clicked into place today. As much as I’m pleased for his owners and myself, I’m more pleased for the horse – to win in a Group 1 is great. He is a lovely horse and has never let us down".

Lightning Spear returned five weeks later for the Prix du Moulin at Longchamp in which he started second favourite but finished fifth behind Recoletos. In October he ran for the third time in the Queen Elizabeth II Stakes and was partnered by Mickael Barzalona as Murphy rode Qatar Racings' more fancied runner Roaring Lion. After racing towards the rear he made some progress in the second half of the race but never looked likely to win and came home seventh of the thirteen runners. For his final appearance he was sent to the United States for the Breeders' Cup Mile at Churchill Downs on 3 November and finished seventh to Expert Eye.

The 2018 World's Best Racehorse Rankings saw Lighting Spear given a rating of 119, making him the 54th best racehorse in the world.

== Stud record ==
Lighting Spear began his career as a breeding stallion at the Tweenhills Stud in Gloucestershire, standing at an initial fee of £8,500.

== Pedigree ==
Pedigree of Lightning Spear (GB), chestnut stallion, 2011
Sire Pivotal (GB) 1993	Polar Falcon (USA); 1987	Nureyev	Northern Dancer (CAN)
Sire Pivotal (GB) 1993	Polar Falcon (USA); 1987	Nureyev	Special
Sire Pivotal (GB) 1993	Polar Falcon (USA); 1987	Marie d’Argonne (FR)	Jefferson (GB)
Sire Pivotal (GB) 1993	Polar Falcon (USA); 1987	Marie d’Argonne (FR)	Mohair
Sire Pivotal (GB) 1993	Fearless Revival; 1987	Cozzene (USA)	Caro (IRE)
Sire Pivotal (GB) 1993	Fearless Revival; 1987	Cozzene (USA)	Ride The Trails
Sire Pivotal (GB) 1993	Fearless Revival; 1987	Stufida	Bustino
Sire Pivotal (GB) 1993	Fearless Revival; 1987	Stufida	Zerbinetta
Dam Atlantic Destiny (IRE) 1996	Royal Academy (USA); 1985	Nijinsky (CAN)	Northern Dancer
Dam Atlantic Destiny (IRE) 1996	Royal Academy (USA); 1985	Nijinsky (CAN)	Flaming Page
Dam Atlantic Destiny (IRE) 1996	Royal Academy (USA); 1985	Crimson Saint	Crimson Satan
Dam Atlantic Destiny (IRE) 1996	Royal Academy (USA); 1985	Crimson Saint	Bolero Rose
Dam Atlantic Destiny (IRE) 1996	Respectfully (USA); 1983	The Minstrel (CAN)	Northern Dancer
Dam Atlantic Destiny (IRE) 1996	Respectfully (USA); 1983	The Minstrel (CAN)	Fleur
Dam Atlantic Destiny (IRE) 1996	Respectfully (USA); 1983	Treat Me Nobly	Vaguely Noble (IRE)
Dam Atlantic Destiny (IRE) 1996	Respectfully (USA); 1983	Treat Me Nobly	What A Treat (Family: 8-c)

- Lightning Spear was inbred 4 × 4 × 4 to Northern Dancer meaning that this stallion appears three times in the fourth generation of his pedigree.
