= British Champions Series =

The British Champions Series was a series of 35 top British flat races, which culminated in a day-long festival of championship races, known as British Champions Day. It was inaugurated in the 2011 season to draw together some of Britain's key flat races into a meaningful championship, with the hope of generating coverage and stimulating interest among the more casual sports fan. It was believed to have achieved its aims based on an increase of 7% attendance at the race days that were part of the 2011 series, as opposed to a 3.9% increase in attendances across the season's race programme as a whole.

The championships were sponsored by the Qatari investment group QIPCO since its inception in 2011. In June 2015 QIPCO renewed their sponsorship until at least 2024 in a deal worth more than £50m, the biggest sponsorship deal ever for British horse racing.

The series was split into five divisions - Sprint, Mile, Middle Distance, Long Distance and Fillies & Mares. This series included all Group One races in Great Britain, except those limited to two year old horses.

The series was discontinued in 2025.

== Races ==
=== Sprint ===
Race	Date	Distance	Course
King Charles III Stakes	Mid June	5 furlongs	Ascot
Commonwealth Cup	Mid June	6 furlongs	Ascot
Queen Elizabeth II Jubilee Stakes	Mid June	6 furlongs	Ascot
July Cup	Mid July	6 furlongs	Newmarket
Nunthorpe Stakes	Late August	5 furlongs	York
Haydock Sprint Cup	Early September	6 furlongs	Haydock
British Champions Sprint Stakes	Mid October	6 furlongs	Ascot

=== Mile ===
Race	Date	Distance	Course
2,000 Guineas	Early May	1 mile	Newmarket
Lockinge Stakes	Mid May	1 mile	Newbury
Queen Anne Stakes	Mid June	1 mile	Ascot
St. James's Palace Stakes	Mid June	1 mile	Ascot
Sussex Stakes	Late July	1 mile	Goodwood
Sun Chariot Stakes	Early October	1 mile	Newmarket
Queen Elizabeth II Stakes	Mid October	1 mile	Ascot

=== Middle Distance ===
Race	Date	Distance	Course
Coronation Cup	Early June	1 mile 4 furlongs	Epsom
Epsom Derby	Early June	1 mile 4 furlongs	Epsom
Prince of Wales's Stakes	Mid June	1 mile 2 furlongs	Ascot
Eclipse Stakes	Early July	1 mile 2 furlongs	Sandown
King George VI & Queen Elizabeth Stakes	Late July	1 mile 4 furlongs	Ascot
Juddmonte International Stakes	Mid August	1 mile 2 furlongs	York
Champion Stakes	Mid October	1 mile 2 furlongs	Ascot

=== Long Distance ===
Race	Date	Distance	Course
Yorkshire Cup	Mid May	1 mile 6 furlongs	York
Ascot Gold Cup	Mid June	2 miles 4 furlongs	Ascot
Goodwood Cup	Early August	2 miles	Goodwood
Lonsdale Cup	Late August	2 miles 1/2 furlong	York
Doncaster Cup	Mid September	2 miles 2 furlongs	Doncaster
St. Leger Stakes	Mid September	1 mile 6 furlongs	Doncaster
British Champions Long Distance Cup	Mid October	2 miles	Ascot

=== Fillies & Mares ===
Race	Date	Distance	Course
1,000 Guineas	Early May	1 mile	Newmarket
Epsom Oaks	Early June	1 mile 4 furlongs	Epsom
Coronation Stakes	Mid June	1 mile	Ascot
Falmouth Stakes	Mid July	1 mile	Newmarket
Nassau Stakes	Early August	1 mile 2 furlongs	Goodwood
Yorkshire Oaks	Mid/Late August	1 mile 4 furlongs	York
British Champions Fillies & Mares Stakes	Mid October	1 mile 4 furlongs	Ascot

== See also ==
- List of British flat horse races
