= Masar (horse) =

Irish Thoroughbred racehorse

- Racing silks of Godolphin
- Sire: New Approach
- Grandsire: Galileo
- Dam: Khawlah
- Damsire: Cape Cross
- Sex: Colt
- Foaled: 16 April 2015
- Country: Ireland
- Colour: Chestnut
- Breeder: Godolphin
- Owner: Godolphin
- Trainer: Charlie Appleby
- Record: 11: 4-0-3
- Earnings: £1,028,797

Major wins
- Solario Stakes (2017); Craven Stakes (2018); Epsom Derby (2018)

Masar (foaled 16 April 2015) is an Irish-bred Thoroughbred racehorse, best known for winning the 2018 Epsom Derby. He was highly tried as a two-year-old, finishing third in the Chesham Stakes and winning the Solario Stakes before contesting major races in France and the United States. After racing unsuccessfully in Dubai he returned to Europe in the spring of 2018 to win the Craven Stakes and then ran third when favourite for the 2000 Guineas. After winning the Derby in June he had injury problems and was off the course for over a year before returning as four-year-old in 2019. He failed to recover his form in two starts and was retired from racing.

== Background ==
Masar is a chestnut colt with a white blaze bred in Ireland by Sheikh Mohammed's Godolphin organisation. He was sent into training with Charlie Appleby at Moulton Paddocks in Newmarket, Suffolk.

He was from the fifth crop of foals sired by New Approach, who won the Epsom Derby and Champion Stakes in 2008. His other foals have included Dawn Approach and Talent. Masar's dam Khawlah was a top-class racemare who won the UAE Oaks and UAE Derby in 2012. She was a great-granddaughter of Urban Sea, making her a close relative of Galileo, Sea the Stars, King's Best and Anabaa Blue.

== Racing career ==
=== 2017: two-year-old season ===
Masar made his racecourse debut in a minor event over six furlongs at Goodwood Racecourse on 25 May. Ridden by William Buick he was made the 5/2 favourite and won by a short head from Invincible Army. At Royal Ascot in June Masar ran third behind the Irish filly September in the Chesham Stakes. Following a two-month break, Masar returned to action in the Solario Stakes over seven furlongs at Sandown Park Racecourse and started the 11/8 favourite. Ridden by James Doyle he took the lead a furlong out and won "readily" by two lengths from Romanised (later to win the Irish 2000 Guineas). The colt was then sent to France for the Prix Jean-Luc Lagardère over 1600 metres at Chantilly Racecourse on 3 October. He took the lead in the straight but was overtaken in the final strides and finished third behind Happily and Olmedo. On his final appearance of the year, Masar was sent to California and started the 4/1 favourite for the Breeders' Cup Juvenile Turf at Del Mar on 3 November. He was repeatedly blocked when attempting to obtain a clear run and finished sixth of the fourteen runners behind Mendelssohn.

=== 2018: three-year-old season ===
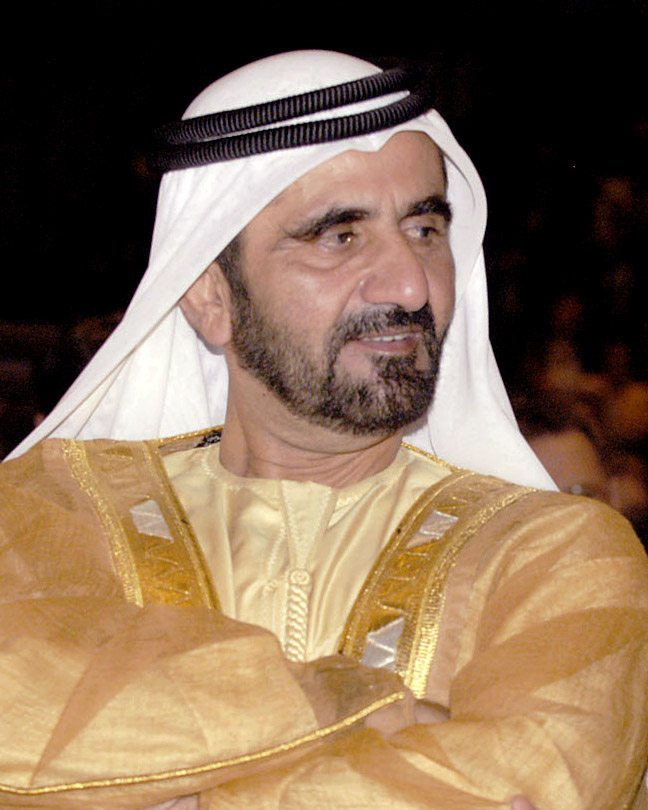
Masar's owner Sheikh Mohammed

In the winter of 2017/2018, Masar was sent to Godolphin's training base in the United Arab Emirates. On 10 March he started odds-on favourite for the Listed Al Bastakiya over 1900 metres at Meydan Racecourse but finished unplaced behind Yulong Warrior. On his first appearance in Europe in 2018, Masar started at odds of 7/2 for the Craven Stakes (a trial race for the 2000 Guineas) over the Rowley Mile at Newmarket Racecourse on 19 April. Ridden by William Buick, he led from the start and came home nine lengths clear of White Mocha, with Roaring Lion a head away in third place. After the race Appleby commented "He's a horse we held in high regard. He's growing up all the time and has done a professional job." While Buick said "He felt great, and he relaxed beautifully in front. He handled the dip and undulations really well. It was a really good performance and an exciting one. He feels like the finished article now." In the 2000 Guineas on 5 May, Masar, ridden by Buick, was made the 5/2 favourite in a fourteen-runner field but was beaten into third place behind Saxon Warrior and the 20/1 outsider Tip Two Win.

On 3 June 2018 Masar was one of twelve colts to contest the 239th running of the Derby Stakes over one and a half miles at Epsom Racecourse and started a 16/1 outsider. Saxon Warrior went off the 4/5 favourite while the other runners included Roaring Lion, Young Rascal (Chester Vase), Hazapour (Derrinstown Stud Derby Trial), Knight to Behold, (Lingfield Derby Trial) and Sevenna Star (Sandown Classic Trial). William Buick settled Masar in mid division as Knight to Behold set the pace before moving to the outside to make his challenge in the straight. Masar took the lead approaching the final furlong and won by one and a half lengths from Dee Ex Bee. His victory in the race was a first for his owner, trainer and rider although members of Sheikh Mohammed's family had owned Lammtarra, New Approach, Nashwan, Erhaab and High-Rise. After the race Sheikh Mohammed said "It's amazing to win the Derby. We have tried to win it so many times. To finally win the race is very special. Horses are my blood so it is a special moment". William Buick commented "I'm not going to explain myself very well now, but this is huge—massive. He stayed the trip, traveled beautifully today, and the Guineas didn't happen for him. The team believed, and I'm very pleased. This is everything." Charlie Appleby said "All I could think of in the last furlongs was that I wanted to be the first trainer to win the Derby in the Godolphin blue. We just wanted to get him to switch off, and we thought he’d stay. William's given him a brilliant ride but the last 100 yards seemed a long time."

Masar was being prepared for a run in the Eclipse Stakes in July when he sustained a leg injury in training, forcing him to miss the race. A week later, Appleby explained that the colt would miss the rest of the season, but was expected to return as a four-year-old.

=== 2019: four-year-old season ===
After an absence of over a year he returned in the Group 2 Hardwicke Stakes at Royal Ascot in which he was ridden by James Doyle. He lost any chance at the start when he stumbled badly, almost unseating Doyle, and eventually came home fifth of the eight runners behind Defoe. On his only subsequent start he was made the 5/6 favourite for the Princess of Wales's Stakes at Newmarket on 11 July but after pulling hard for most of the way he dropped from contention and finished last of the six runners. Five days later it was announced that the horse had been retired from racing to become a breeding stallion.

== Assessment and honours ==
In the official European Classification for 2017, Masar was rated the fifteenth-best two-year-old colt of the season, ten pounds behind the top-ranked U S Navy Flag.

In the 2018 World's Best Racehorse Rankings Masar was rated the fifth best three-year-old colt and the thirty-first best horse of any age or sex.

== Pedigree ==
Pedigree of Masar (IRE), chestnut colt, 2015
Sire New Approach (IRE) 2005	Galileo (IRE); 1998	Sadler's Wells	Northern Dancer
Sire New Approach (IRE) 2005	Galileo (IRE); 1998	Sadler's Wells	Fairy Bridge
Sire New Approach (IRE) 2005	Galileo (IRE); 1998	Urban Sea	Miswaki
Sire New Approach (IRE) 2005	Galileo (IRE); 1998	Urban Sea	Allegretta
Sire New Approach (IRE) 2005	Park Express (IRE); 1983	Ahonoora	Lorenzaccio
Sire New Approach (IRE) 2005	Park Express (IRE); 1983	Ahonoora	Helen Nichols
Sire New Approach (IRE) 2005	Park Express (IRE); 1983	Matcher	Match
Sire New Approach (IRE) 2005	Park Express (IRE); 1983	Matcher	Lachine
Dam Khawlah (GB) 2008	Cape Cross (IRE); 1994	Green Desert	Danzig
Dam Khawlah (GB) 2008	Cape Cross (IRE); 1994	Green Desert	Foreign Courier
Dam Khawlah (GB) 2008	Cape Cross (IRE); 1994	Park Appeal	Ahonoora
Dam Khawlah (GB) 2008	Cape Cross (IRE); 1994	Park Appeal	Balidaress
Dam Khawlah (GB) 2008	Villarrica (USA); 2002	Selkirk	Sharpen Up
Dam Khawlah (GB) 2008	Villarrica (USA); 2002	Selkirk	Annie Edge
Dam Khawlah (GB) 2008	Villarrica (USA); 2002	Melikah	Lammtarra
Dam Khawlah (GB) 2008	Villarrica (USA); 2002	Melikah	Urban Sea (Family: 9-h)

- Masar is inbred 3 × 4 to Urban Sea and Ahonoora, meaning that both horses appears in the third and fourth generations of the sire and dam side of his pedigree, respectively.
