= Qatar Investment & Projects Development Holding Company =

Shareholding company based in Doha, Qatar

Qatar Investment & Projects Development Holding Company (QIPCO)
- Founded: 1999
- Headquarters: Doha, Qatar
- Key people: Sh. Abdullah bin Khalifa Al Thani (Chairman)
- Website: qipco.com.qa

Qatar Investment & Projects Development Holding Company (QIPCO) is a prominent Qatari shareholding company based in Doha, which through its subsidiaries, maintains a focus on financial and real estate markets.

== Overview ==
QIPCO Holding was founded in 1999, initially as a property developer and equity investor, in an effort to claim a stake and contribute to Qatar’s development. It has investments with global companies in various sectors including real estate, construction, oil and gas, trading and advanced services, finance and joint ventures. Through investing approximately Qrs. 300 million of its capital, the company has sought to maintain diversified interests in the region by forming numerous independently operated subsidiaries that specialize in their respective sectors. These subsidiaries include Midmac Contracting, Mannai Corporation, Black Cat Engineering & Construction, Tornado Company, Special Projects Services Company, Investment House, Al Bustan Real Estate Company, and QIPCO Residential Compound. It has established joint venture companies with strategic partners including Siemens, General Motors, Cisco, ThyssenKrupp, Emcor, and Transfield.

== Current standing ==
Its latest strategy in recent years has been to develop a diversified portfolio focusing on emerging markets. QIPCO has also aligned itself to the Qatar National Vision 2030. In light of the recent granting to Qatar as the host of the 2022 FIFA World Cup, QIPCO seeks to assist the country in meeting its objectives both in investment and infrastructure strategies and execution as a host city of the World Cup.

== Leadership ==
Currently, QIPCO has 5 members on its board of directors. Its chairman is Sheikh Abdullah bin Khalifa Al Thani and its CEO is Sheikh Hamad Bin Abdulla Bin Khalifa Al Thani, who is also the Chairman of the board of Midmac Contracting Company, LLC. Sheikh Hamad is Sheikh Abdulla's son while Sheikh Abdulla is the uncle of the Present Emir of Qatar and the younger brother of the Emir Father. Its Deputy CEO and Director is Mohammed Ali Mohammad Khamis Al Kubaisi. QIPCO’s board of directors is made up entirely of members of Qatar’s ruling family. Hamad bin Abdullah bin Khalifa bin Hamad Al Thani is the first cousin of Sheikh Tamim Bin Hamad Bin Khalifa Al Thani, the current Emir of Qatar.

== Controversy ==
In March 2016, Amnesty International released a report stating that in the interviews they conducted with workers refurbishing the Khalifa National Stadium in Doha "all reported human rights abuses of one kind or another," and that the "vast majority alleged they had their passports confiscated", this despite the Qatari government's promise to ensure minimum labour standards on World Cup sites. The confiscation of passports also known as the Kafala system in Qatar was abolished during the year 2021 and the country took multiple measures for its workers sector which was included in the report published by Human Rights Watch in September 2020. According to the report’s findings, Qatar introduced a new rule where migrant workers can freely change jobs without employer permission at any time during their employment, including during the probation period, as long as they notify their employers in accordance with Labor Ministry procedures within a prescribed notice period.

The contractor refurbishing the stadium is a partnership between a subsidiary of the Belgian company Besix, and the Qatari company Midmac, a QIPCO subsidiary. Midmac is also the main contractor at Al Wakrah stadium.
