= Saxon Warrior =

Japanese Thoroughbred racehorse

- Racing silks of Mr Derrick Smith
- Sire: Deep Impact
- Grandsire: Sunday Silence
- Dam: Maybe
- Damsire: Galileo
- Sex: Stallion
- Foaled: 26 January 2015
- Country: Japan
- Colour: Bay
- Breeder: Orpendale, Chelston & Wynatt or Northern Farm
- Owner: Derrick Smith, Sue Magnier & Michael Tabor
- Trainer: Aidan O'Brien
- Record: 9: 4-2-1
- Earnings: £1,112,467

Major wins
- Beresford Stakes (2017); Racing Post Trophy (2017); 2000 Guineas (2018)

Saxon Warrior (foaled 26 January 2015) is a Japanese-bred, Irish-trained Thoroughbred racehorse. As a two-year-old in 2017 he was one of the best colts of his generation in Europe, winning all three of his races including the Beresford Stakes and the Racing Post Trophy. On his three-year-old debut the colt won the 2000 Guineas before finishing fourth when odds-on favourite for the 2018 Epsom Derby. He went on to be placed in the Irish Derby, Eclipse Stakes and Irish Champion Stakes.

== Background ==
Saxon Warrior is a bay stallion with a narrow white blaze bred in Japan by Orpendale, Chelston & Wynatt, a breeding company associated with the Coolmore Stud. Like most Coolmore horses he was sent into training with Aidan O'Brien at Ballydoyle. For racing purposes Saxon Warrior was registered as being owned by Derrick Smith, Mrs John Magnier and Michael Tabor although the precise details of his ownership differed from race to race.

He is from the eighth crop of foals sired by Japanese Triple Crown champion Deep Impact, who was the Japanese Horse of the Year in 2005 and 2006, winning races including the Tokyo Yushun, Tenno Sho, Arima Kinen and Japan Cup. Deep Impact's other progeny include Gentildonna, Harp Star, Kizuna, A Shin Hikari, Satono Diamond and Makahiki. Saxon Warrior is the second foal of his dam Maybe who was awarded the title of European Champion Two-Year-Old Filly in 2011 when she was undefeated in five races including the Moyglare Stud Stakes. Maybe's dam Sumora was a half-sister to Dancing Rain and closely related to Dr Devious.

== Racing career ==
=== 2017: two-year-old season ===
Saxon Warrior made his racecourse debut in a maiden race over one mile at the Curragh on 27 August in which he was ridden by his trainer's son Donnacha O'Brien and started at odds of 8/1 in a fourteen-runner field. After racing towards the rear of the field for most of the way he began to make rapid progress in the last quarter mile, took the lead inside the furlong and won "comfortably" by three and a quarter lengths from Meagher's Flag. Four weeks later, the colt was stepped up in class for the Group 2 Beresford Stakes over the same distance at Naas Racecourse. Ridden by Ryan Moore he was made the 5/6 favourite with the best of his four opponents appearing to be his stablemates Delano Roosevelt and Kew Gardens. After settling in third place, Saxon Warrior took the lead approaching the final furlong and went clear of his rivals to win by two lengths from Delano Roosevelt.

On 28 October, Saxon Warrior, accompanied by his stablemates Seahenge (Champagne Stakes), The Pentagon (Tyros Stakes) and Coat of Arms was sent to England to contest the Group 1 Racing Post Trophy at Doncaster Racecourse. The Irish contingent was completed by the National Stakes winner Verbal Dexterity, while the best of the British contenders appeared to be Roaring Lion and Chilean (Ascendant Stakes). Ridden by Moore, and starting the 13/8 favourite, Saxon Warrior tracked the leaders before going to the front two furlongs out. He was overtaken by Roaring Lion and hampered as his rival hung left but rallied "gamely" in the final strides to regain the advantage and win by a neck. The colt's victory gave Aidan O'Brien a record-breaking 26th Group 1 win of the season and saw Saxon Warrior promoted to favourite for the following year's Epsom Derby.

=== 2018: three-year-old season ===
Commenting on Saxon Warrior's progress in the early spring of 2018, Aidan O'Brien said "He's done very well and is a massive, big, physical horse. He was a big horse last year but he's bigger this year... He'll probably go straight for the Guineas." As O'Brien predicted he made his seasonal debut in the 210th running of the 2000 Guineas over the Rowley Mile at Newmarket Racecourse on 5 May and with Moore engaged to ride Mendelssohn in the Kentucky Derby the colt was ridden by Donnacha O'Brien. Saxon Warrior was made the 3/1 second favourite behind Masar while the other twelve runners included Roaring Lion, Gustav Klimt (Superlative Stakes), Elarqam (Somerville Tattersall Stakes), Expert Eye, James Garfield (Greenham Stakes), Rajasinghe (Coventry Stakes) and Cardsharp (July Stakes). Saxon Warrior was not among the early leaders as Murillo set the pace from Cardsharp, but moved into the lead two furlongs out. Staying on strongly down the centre of the course he won by one and a half lengths from the 50/1 outsider Tip Two Win who took second place ahead of Masar, Elarqaman and Roaring Lion. Donnacha O'Brien commented "It's very special. Obviously, I’m winning this race and riding in big races because of the position I’m in. I’m just very grateful. He's a very good horse, he's a proper horse". Derrick Smith's son Paul said "It was really eye-catching, Donnacha couldn’t speak too highly of him. He said when he quickened it was all over in a flash. He probably got there sooner than he wanted to, but he had so much horse under him. It's very exciting when they have that speed and look like they’ll get further. All things point to June now."

At Epsom Racecourse on 2 June Saxon Warrior started the 4/5 favourite in a twelve-runner field for the 2018 Epsom Derby. Ridden by Moore he stumbled at the start and had difficulty obtaining a clear run in the straight before staying on in the closing stages to finish fourth behind Masar, Dee Ex Bee and Roaring Lion. Four weeks later at the Curragh the colt started favourite for the Irish Derby, but despite making steady progress in the straight he never looked likely to win and finished third, beaten half a length and a neck by Latrobe and Rostropovich. He was then dropped back in distance and matched against older horses in the ten-furlong Eclipse Stakes at Sandown Park a week later. He was beaten a neck by Roaring Lion after a sustained struggle over the final furlong and looked a slightly unlucky loser as he was bumped by his rival in the final strides. At York Racecourse on 22 August he contested the International Stakes but proved no match for Roaring Lion, and was beaten five length into fourth place. The colt produced a much better effort in the Irish Champion Stakes at Leopardstown in which he took the lead in the straight and looked likely to win but was run down in the final strides and beaten a neck by his old rival Roaring Lion.

Saxon Warrior was found to be lame after his run in the Irish Champion Stakes and a veterinary examination revealed a serious injury to the flexor tendon in his left foreleg. Aidan O'Brien announced on 16 September that the colt was to be retired from racing.

== Race record ==
Date	Course	Race	Grade	Distance	Field	Finish	Time (Note: Official time of winning horse. The time written in Italics doesn't belong to Saxon Warrior.)	Winning (Losing) Margin	Jockey	Winner (2nd Place)	Ref
2017 – two-year-old season
Aug 17	Curragh	Maiden 2YO		1 mile	14	1st	1m 40.80s	3 1/4 L	D O'Brien	(Meagher's Flag)	
Sep 24	Naas	Beresford Stake	GII	1 mile	5	1st	1m 46.45s	2 1/2 L	R Moore	(Delano Roosevelt)	
Oct 28	Doncaster	Racing Post Trophy	GI	1 mile	12	1st	1m 40.12s	Neck	R Moore	(Roaring Lion)	
2018 – three-year-old season
May 5	Newmarket	2000 Guineas Stakes	GI	1 mile	14	1st	1m 36.55s	1 1/2 L	D O'Brien	(Tip Two Win)	
Jun 2	Epsom Downs	Epsom Derby	GI	1 mile 4 furlongs	12	4th	2m 34.93s	2 1/2 L	R Moore	Masar	
Jun 30	Curragh	Irish Derby	GI	1 mile 4 furlongs	12	3rd	2m 32.62s	Neck	R Moore	Latrobe	
Jul 7	Sandown Park	Eclipse Stakes	GI	1 mile 2 furlongs	7	2nd	2m 4.04s	Neck	D O'Brien	Roaring Lion	
Aug 22	York	International Stakes	GI	1 mile 2½ furlongs	8	4th	2m 7.70s	1 1/4 L	R Moore	Roaring Lion	
Sep 15	Leopardstown	Irish Champion Stakes	GI	1 mile 2 furlongs	7	2nd	2m 7.21s	Neck	R Moore	Roaring Lion	

== Stud career ==
Saxon Warrior stands as a stallion at Coolmore Stud for a service fee of €10,000.

=== Notable progeny ===
c = colt, f = filly, g = gelding

Foaled	Name	Sex	Major wins
2020	Victoria Road	c	Breeders' Cup Juvenile Turf
2021	Borna	c	Derby Italiano
2022	Sheza Alibi	f	Randwick Guineas, Doncaster Mile, Makybe Diva Stakes
2024	Green Empress	f	Prix Marcel Boussac

== Assessment and honours ==
In the official European Classification for 2017, Saxon Warrior was rated the second-best two-year-old of the season, three pounds behind his stablemate U S Navy Flag.

== Pedigree ==
Pedigree of Saxon Warrior (JPN), bay colt 2015
Sire Deep Impact (JPN) 2002	Sunday Silence (USA); 1986	Halo	Hail to Reason
Sire Deep Impact (JPN) 2002	Sunday Silence (USA); 1986	Halo	Cosmah
Sire Deep Impact (JPN) 2002	Sunday Silence (USA); 1986	Wishing Well (horse)	Understanding
Sire Deep Impact (JPN) 2002	Sunday Silence (USA); 1986	Wishing Well (horse)	Mountain Flower
Sire Deep Impact (JPN) 2002	Wind in Her Hair (IRE); 1991	Alzao (USA)	Lyphard
Sire Deep Impact (JPN) 2002	Wind in Her Hair (IRE); 1991	Alzao (USA)	Lady Rebecca (GB)
Sire Deep Impact (JPN) 2002	Wind in Her Hair (IRE); 1991	Burghclere (GB)	Busted
Sire Deep Impact (JPN) 2002	Wind in Her Hair (IRE); 1991	Burghclere (GB)	Highclere
Dam Maybe (IRE) 2009	Galileo; 1998	Sadler's Wells (USA)	Northern Dancer (CAN)
Dam Maybe (IRE) 2009	Galileo; 1998	Sadler's Wells (USA)	Fairy Bridge
Dam Maybe (IRE) 2009	Galileo; 1998	Urban Sea (USA)	Miswaki
Dam Maybe (IRE) 2009	Galileo; 1998	Urban Sea (USA)	Allegretta (GB)
Dam Maybe (IRE) 2009	Sumora; 2002	Danehill (USA)	Danzig
Dam Maybe (IRE) 2009	Sumora; 2002	Danehill (USA)	Razyana
Dam Maybe (IRE) 2009	Sumora; 2002	Rain Flower	Indian Ridge
Dam Maybe (IRE) 2009	Sumora; 2002	Rain Flower	Rose of Jericho (USA) (Family: 1-t)
