= Expert Eye =

British-bred Thoroughbred racehorse

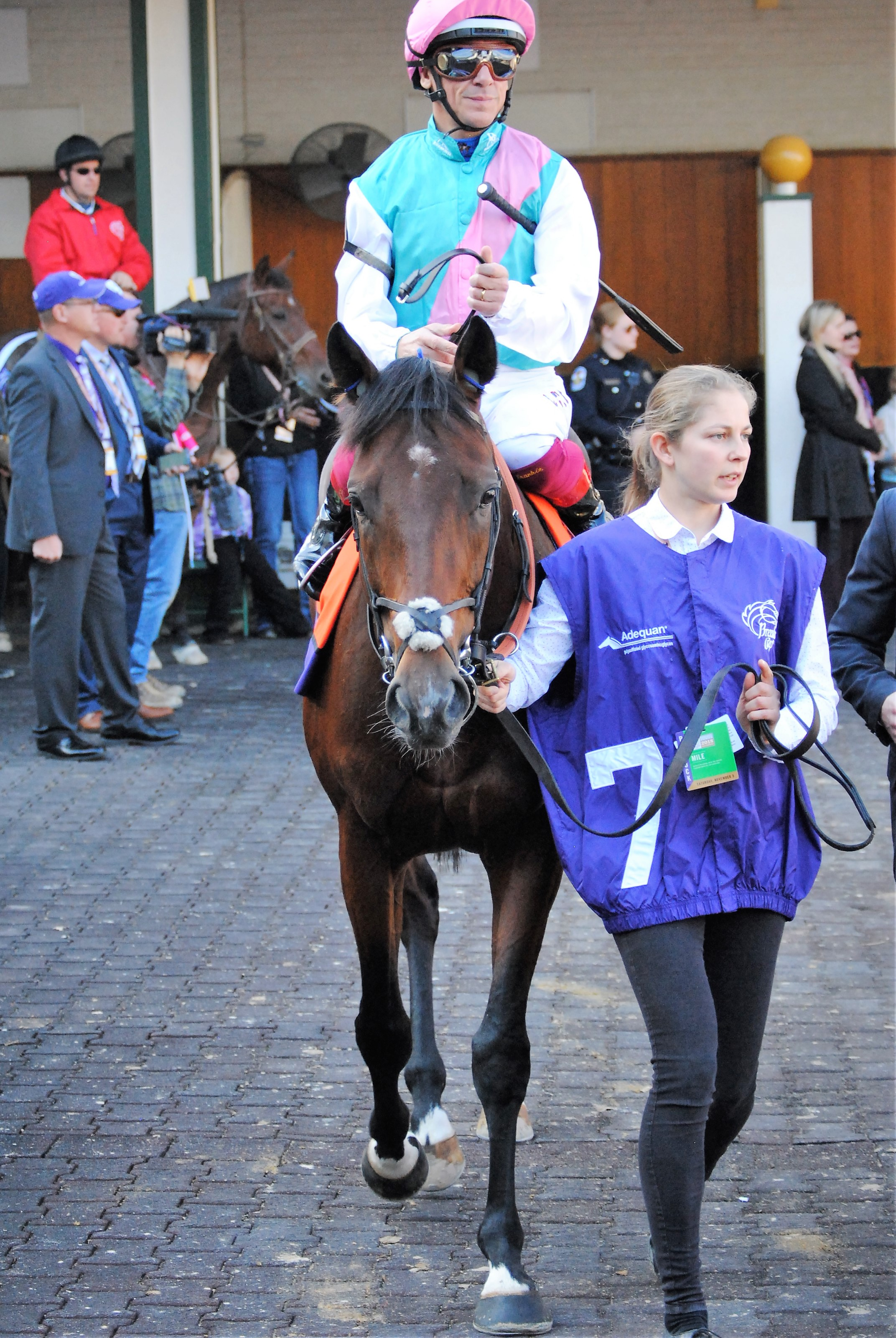
- Expert Eye at the 2018 Breeders' Cup
- Sire: Acclamation
- Grandsire: Royal Applause
- Dam: Exemplify
- Damsire: Dansili
- Sex: Colt
- Foaled: 31 January 2015
- Country: United Kingdom
- Colour: Bay
- Breeder: Juddmonte Farms
- Owner: Khalid Abdullah
- Trainer: Michael Stoute
- Record: 10: 5-2-1
- Earnings: £1,369,751

Major wins
- Vintage Stakes (2017); Jersey Stakes (2018); City of York Stakes (2018); Breeders' Cup Mile (2018)

Expert Eye (foaled 31 January 2015) is a British-bred Thoroughbred racehorse. He was one of the most promising two-year-olds of his generation in 2017 when he won the Vintage Stakes but disappointed on his final start in the Dewhurst Stakes. In 2018 he won the Jersey Stakes and City of York Stakes and was placed in the Greenham Stakes, Sussex Stakes and Prix du Moulin before recording his biggest win in the Breeders' Cup Mile.

== Background ==
Expert Eye is a bay colt with a small white star and three white coronet marks bred in England by his owner Khalid Abullah's Juddmonte Farms. He was sent into training with Michael Stoute at his Freemason Lodge stable in Newmarket, Suffolk.

He was sired by Acclamation, a high-class sprinter who won the Diadem Stakes in 2003 and whose other progeny have included Dark Angel, Marsha and Equiano. Expert Eye's dam Exemplify showed modest racing ability, winning one minor race from four starts in France, but was a half-sister to Special Duty and a female-line descendant of Chris Evert was closely related to Chief's Crown and Winning Colors.

== Racing career ==
=== 2017: two-year-old season ===
Expert Eye began his racing career in a minor race over six and a half furlongs at Newbury Racecourse on 15 June and started at odds of 6/1 in a nine-runner field. Ridden by Ryan Moore he overtook the favourite Mutakatif in the final furlong and won "readily" by one and a half lengths.

On 1 August the colt was stepped up in class for the Group 2 Vintage Stakes over seven furlongs at Goodwood Racecourse in which he was ridden by Andrea Atzeni and was made the 7/4 ahead of nine opponents. After racing in mid-division, Expert Eye took the lead approaching the last quarter mile and drew away to win in "impressive" style by four and a half lengths from Zaman. Following the race Atzeni said "He was very good. He settled nicely, but approaching three out we'd gone slow and he took off, I ended up getting there way too soon. I wasn't hard on him and when I picked him up he galloped out really well. I don't think I've sat on many two-year-olds like this". The form of the race was subsequently franked as Seahenge (fourth) and James Garfield (fifth) won the Champagne Stakes and the Mill Reef Stakes respectively. Expert Eye was made the ante-post favourite for the 2018 2000 Guineas but missed a scheduled appearance in the National Stakes after he was found to have contracted a minor respiratory infection.

On 14 October Expert Eye was made the 4/7 favourite for the Group 1 Dewhurst Stakes at Newmarket Racecourse when he was again ridden by Atzeni. After racing in second place he faded badly in the last quarter mile and came home last of the nine runners behind U S Navy Flag. He finished the race lame.

=== 2018: three-year-old season ===
Expert Eye began his second campaign in the Greenham Stakes (a major trial race for the 2000 Guineas) run over seven furlongs at Newbury on 21 April. Ridden by Atzeni, he started favourite but despite finishing strongly he failed by three quarters of a length to catch James Garfield. In the 2000 Guineas at Newmarket two weeks later he made little impression, coming home tenth behind Saxon Warrior after being hampered a furlong out. In both of his first two races of 2018 Expert Eye became upset in the starting stalls.

At Royal Ascot in June the colt was dropped back in class and distance for the Group 3 Jersey Stakes over seven furlongs in which he was ridden by James McDonald and started at 8/1. After being restrained towards the rear of the 21-runner field he began to make progress in the last quarter mile took the lead inside the final furlong and accelerated away from his rivals to win by four and a half lengths from Society Power. McDonald commented that the winner "felt like a rocket ship" while Michael Stoute said "He was such a good two-year-old and then things went wrong in the Dewhurst. I’m just so thrilled to see him back to this sort of form". At Goodwood on 1 August he was matched against older horses for the first time in the Sussex Stakes. He tracked the leaders before going to the front in the straight but was overtaken in the closing stages and beaten one and a half lengths into second by the seven-year-old Lightning Spear. Twenty-four days later the colt dropped back to Group 3 class for the City of York Stakes over seven furlongs at York Racecourse in which he was partnered for the first time by Frankie Dettori. Starting the even money favourite he took the lead approaching the final furlong and won by one and a quarter lengths from the ten-year-old Gordon Lord Byron. Stoute commented "He's very nice and relaxed. The stalls' situation has been resolved. He goes in better than ever now and he's very relaxed when he's in there. He seems in a good frame of mind. We just need to eke out a little more improvement. He's not too far off Group 1 class now".

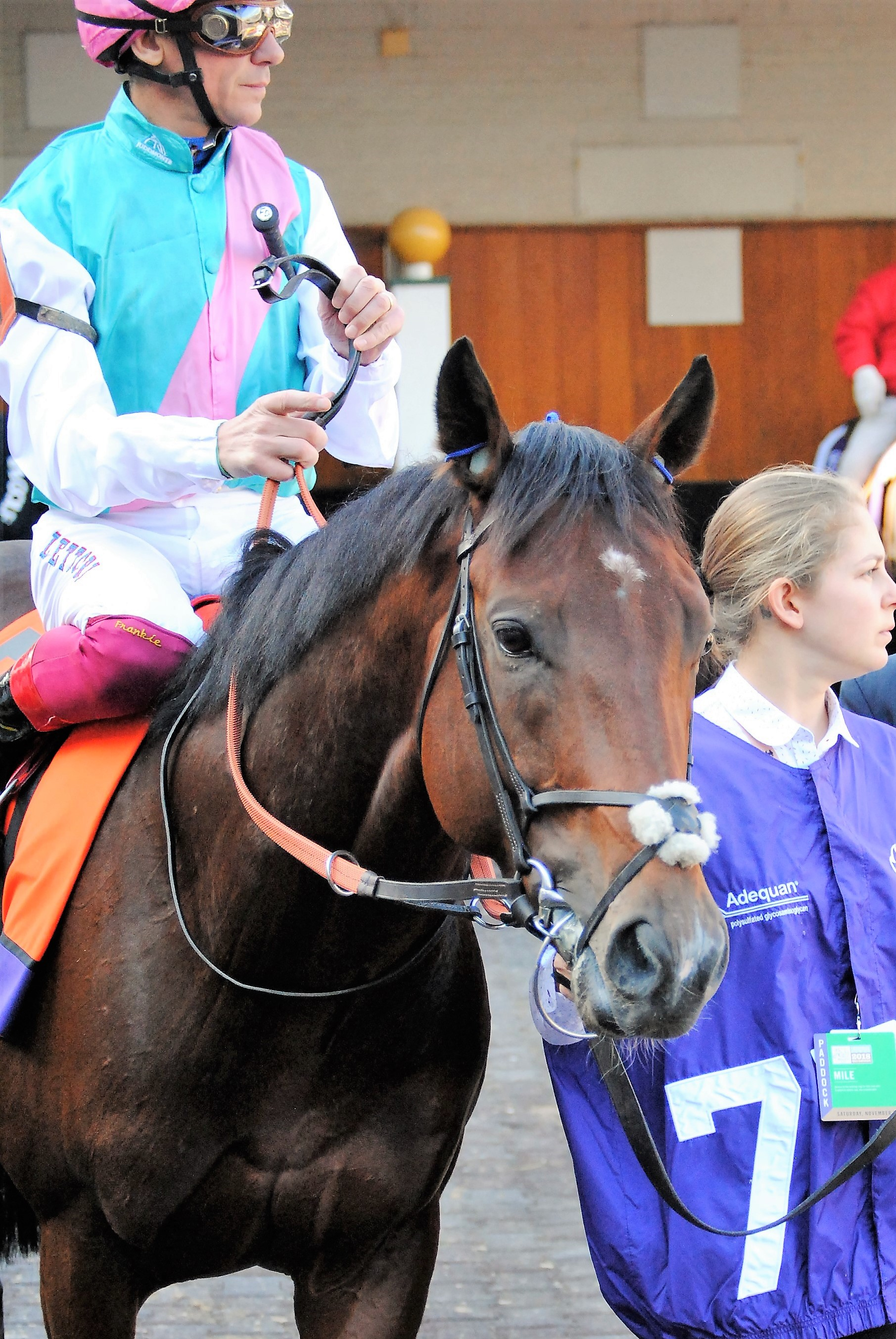
Expert Eye at the 2018 Breeders' Cup

On 9 September at Longchamp Racecourse Expert Eye was made the 5.3/1 third choice in the betting for the Group 1 Prix du Moulin over 1600 metres. With Moore in the saddle he finished strongly to take third place behind Recoletos and Wind Chimes. For his final run of the year the colt was sent to the United States to contest the Breeders' Cup Mile at Churchill Downs on 3 November. With Dettori in the saddle he was made the 9/2 favourite ahead of thirteen opponents including Oscar Performance, Happily, Lightning Spear, Clemmie, I Can Fly (runner-up in the Queen Elizabeth II Stakes), Next Shares (Shadwell Turf Mile Stakes) and One Master (Prix de la Forêt). After racing towards the rear, Expert Eye move up on the outside on the final turn and made his challenge in the straight. He looked unlikely to take a hand in the finish but began to rapid progress in the final furlong, took the lead in the final strides and won by half a length and a neck from Catapult and Analyze It. Dettori said "He broke well but then he took a false step and lost his position and I had to look for a plan B. As we got in to the straight, I asked him to pick up and the response wasn’t there for about 100m. I felt we were going to be a good fifth, and then he just managed to find his rhythm and I could see the leaders stopping. In the last 100 yards, he really got down and sprinted home. I went from despair to joy in the space of 100 yards".

Six days after his Breeders’ Cup victory it was announced that Expert Eye had been retired from racing and would begin his career as a breeding stallion at the Banstead Manor Stud in 2019 at a fee of £20,000.

== Pedigree ==
Pedigree of Expert Eye (GB), bay colt, 2015
Sire Acclamation (GB) 1999	Royal Applause (GB); 1993	Waajib (IRE)	Try My Best (USA)
Sire Acclamation (GB) 1999	Royal Applause (GB); 1993	Waajib (IRE)	Corvana
Sire Acclamation (GB) 1999	Royal Applause (GB); 1993	Flying Melody (IRE)	Auction Ring (USA)
Sire Acclamation (GB) 1999	Royal Applause (GB); 1993	Flying Melody (IRE)	Whispering Star (GB)
Sire Acclamation (GB) 1999	Princess Athena (IRE); 1985	Ahonoora (GB)	Lorenzaccio
Sire Acclamation (GB) 1999	Princess Athena (IRE); 1985	Ahonoora (GB)	Helen Nichols
Sire Acclamation (GB) 1999	Princess Athena (IRE); 1985	Shopping Wise	Floribunda (GB)
Sire Acclamation (GB) 1999	Princess Athena (IRE); 1985	Shopping Wise	Sea Melody (GB)
Dam Exemplify (GB) 2008	Dansili; 1996	Danehill (USA)	Danzig
Dam Exemplify (GB) 2008	Dansili; 1996	Danehill (USA)	Razyana
Dam Exemplify (GB) 2008	Dansili; 1996	Hasili (IRE)	Kahyasi
Dam Exemplify (GB) 2008	Dansili; 1996	Hasili (IRE)	Kerali (GB)
Dam Exemplify (GB) 2008	Quest To Peak (USA); 2002	Distant View	Mr. Prospector
Dam Exemplify (GB) 2008	Quest To Peak (USA); 2002	Distant View	Seven Springs
Dam Exemplify (GB) 2008	Quest To Peak (USA); 2002	Viviana	Nureyev
Dam Exemplify (GB) 2008	Quest To Peak (USA); 2002	Viviana	Nijinsky Star (Family: 23-b)
