= Roaring Lion (horse) =

American-bred Thoroughbred racehorse

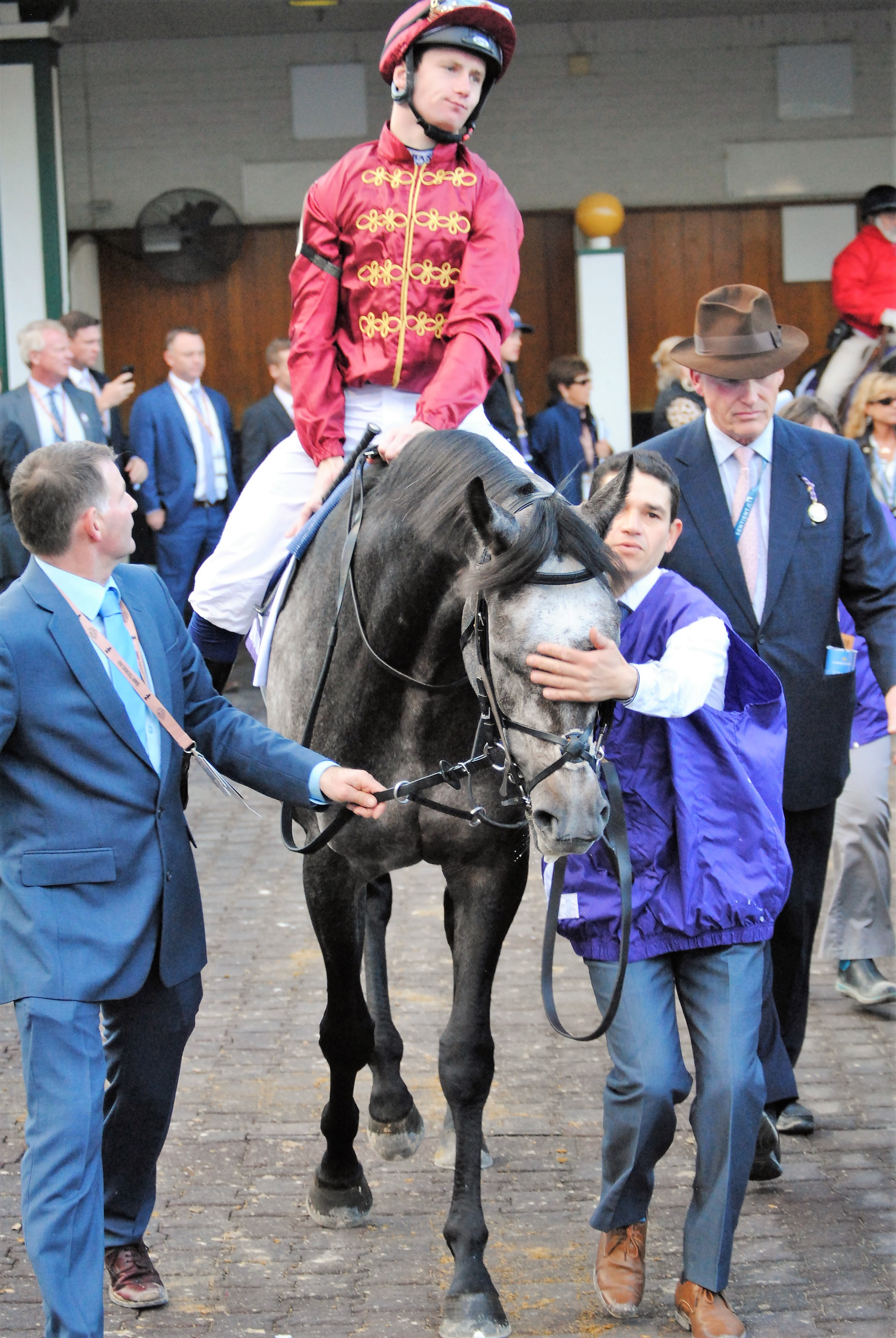
- Roaring Lion at the 2018 Breeders' Cup
- Sire: Kitten's Joy
- Grandsire: El Prado
- Dam: Vionnet
- Damsire: Street Sense
- Sex: Colt
- Foaled: March 11, 2015
- Died: August 23, 2019 (aged 4)
- Country: United States
- Colour: Grey
- Breeder: RanJan Racing Inc
- Owner: Qatar Racing
- Trainer: John Gosden
- Record: 13: 8-1-2
- Earnings: £2,723,865

Major wins
- Royal Lodge Stakes (2017); Dante Stakes (2018); Eclipse Stakes (2018); International Stakes (2018); Irish Champion Stakes (2018); Queen Elizabeth II Stakes (2018)

Awards
- Top-rated British 2-y-o Colt (2017); European Horse of the Year (2018); Cartier Champion Three-year-old Colt (2018); World's best three-year-old (2018)

Roaring Lion (March 11, 2015 – August 23, 2019) was an American-bred British-trained champion Thoroughbred racehorse who was the 2018 European Horse of the Year after winning the Juddemonte International Stakes, Eclipse Stakes, Irish Champion Stakes, and Queen Elizabeth II Stakes

He was the top-rated British-trained two-year-old of 2017, when he won three races, including the Royal Lodge Stakes, and suffered his only defeat when narrowly beaten by Saxon Warrior in the Racing Post Trophy. In the following year he won the Dante Stakes, the Eclipse Stakes, International Stakes, Irish Champion Stakes and Queen Elizabeth II Stakes as well as running third in the Craven Stakes, fifth in the 2000 Guineas and third in the Epsom Derby. He was euthanized following colic on August 23, 2019, at the age of four.

== Background ==
Roaring Lion was a grey colt bred in Kentucky by RanJan Racing Inc. As a yearling he was offered for sale at Keeneland in September 2016 and bought for $160,000 by the bloodstock agent David Redvers. He subsequently entered the ownership of Qatar Racing and was exported to England where he was sent into training with John Gosden at Newmarket, Suffolk. He was ridden in all but one of his races by Oisin Murphy

He was sired by Kenneth and Sarah Ramsey's stallion Kitten's Joy the U.S. Champion Male Turf Horse of 2004 whose other offspring include Stephanie's Kitten, Hawkbill, Bobby's Kitten and Big Blue Kitten. Roaring Lion was the first foal of his dam Vionnet, who won three minor races in the United States and finished third in the Rodeo Drive Stakes. As a descendant of the Irish broodmare Miss Albany (foaled 1938) she was distantly related to Flash of Steel and Rosdhu Queen.

== Racing career ==
=== 2017: two-year-old season ===
Roaring Lion made his debut in a minor race over one mile at Newmarket's July Course on 18 August in which he was ridden by Harry Bentley and started at odds of 7/2 in a ten-runner field. He took the lead a furlong from the finish and won "quite comfortably" by one and three quarter lengths from the 25/1 outsider Abandon Ship. Three weeks later, on the synthetic polytrack surface at Kempton Park Racecourse, the colt started 4/5 favourite for a similar event despite carrying a six-pound weight penalty. He took the lead two furlongs out and despite hanging to the left he pulled away from his rivals to win "very readily" by six lengths.

For his next race, Roaring Lion was stepped up in class for the Group 2 Royal Lodge Stakes over the Rowley Mile at Newmarket and started 11/4 second choice in the betting behind the Aidan O'Brien-trained Nelson, the winner of the Juvenile Stakes. The only one of the other three runners to be given any chance was Mildenberger, who had won the Stonehenge Stakes and finished third in the Vintage Stakes. Roaring Lion took the lead from the front-running Mildenberger approaching the final furlong and held off a challenge from Nelson to win by a neck. When aked if the colt might be a contender for the following year's Epsom Derby Murphy replied "I haven't ridden a Derby horse in a while, so I'm not sure if he is one or not. But he certainly has a big future".

On his final appearance of the season Roaring Lion was moved up again in class for the Racing Post Trophy at Doncaster Racecourse on 28 October. Starting at odds of 8/1 he was restrained by Murphy in the early stages before moving up to take the lead in the final furlong. He stayed on well despite hanging to the left but was caught in the final strides and beaten a neck by Saxon Warrior.

In the official European Classification for 2017, Roaring Lion was rated the third-best two-year-old of the season behind the Irish-trained colts U S Navy Flag and Saxon Warrior.

=== 2018: three-year-old season ===
==== Spring ====
Roaring Lion began his second season by starting odds-on favourite for the Craven Stakes (a major trial race for the 2000 Guineas) over the Rowley Mile on 19 April. He proved no match for Masar, who won by nine lengths and lost second place on the line to the 16/1 outsider White Mocha. In the 2000 Guineas over the same course and distance sixteen days later he started a 14/1 outsider and came home fifth behind Saxon Warrior, Tip Two Win, Masar and Elarqam, beaten two and a half lengths by the winner. On 17 May the colt started 3/1 favourite for the Dante Stakes over ten and a half furlongs at York Racecourse against eight opponents including Mildenberger, White Mocha, Crossed Baton (Blue Riband Trial Stakes) and Wells Farhh Go (Acomb Stakes). He took the lead a furlong and a half from the finish and accelerated away from the field to win "readily" by four and a half lengths. After the race his trainer John Gosden said "I'd have been disappointed if he hadn't won like this, he's been training beautifully at home and he's woken up since the Guineas. He's mentally in the zone, and I expected a big performance".

==== Summer ====
On 3 June 2018 Roaring Lion was one of twelve colts to contest the 239th running of the Derby Stakes over one and a half miles at Epsom Racecourse and started the 6/1 second favourite behind Saxon Warrior. After racing towards the rear and turning into the straight in ninth place he moved up to challenge the leaders approaching the final furlong and finished third behind Masar and Dee Ex Bee. Gosden later explained "He was out on his feet in the last 150 yards... it was like a 1,500 metre runner going in a marathon". The Eclipse Stakes over ten furlongs at Sandown Park Racecourse on 7 July saw Roaring Lion matched against older horses in a seven-runner field which included Saxon Warrior, Happily, Hawkbill and Cliffs of Moher. After being restrained by Murphy in fifth place, Roaring Lion moved up on the outside in the straight and in the closing stages he engaged in a sustained struggle with Saxon Warrior. He crossed the line a neck in front but appeared to have slightly hampered his rival when hanging to the right in the finals strides. The racecourse stewards held an immediate inquiry, but allowed the result to stand. After the race Murphy, who received four-day suspension for "careless riding" on the winner, commented "I was on the best horse in the race, that's the bottom line".

At York in August Roaring Lion started at 3/1 when he faced Saxon Warrior yet again in the International Stakes in an eight-runner field which also included the Group 1 winners Poet's Word (the 8/5 favourite), Thunder Snow, Benbatl (Dubai Turf), Latrobe (Irish Derby) and Without Parole (St James's Palace Stakes). After tracking the leaders on the inside rail he gained valuable racing room when the field tracked right to race up the stands-side in the straight. He went to the front inside the last quarter mile, drew clear of his rivals and won by three and a quarter lengths from Poet's Word, with third place going to the 50/1 outsider Thundering Blue. Gosden said "I had a difficult spring with him and he wasn't enjoying it, but he's been getting better and better and this wasn't a fluke. He wasn't really with me at the time of the Craven and the Guineas but the Guineas put him right. He's a proper horse with a massive middle on him and he's got stronger as the year's gone on... the curve is upward all the way."

==== Autumn ====
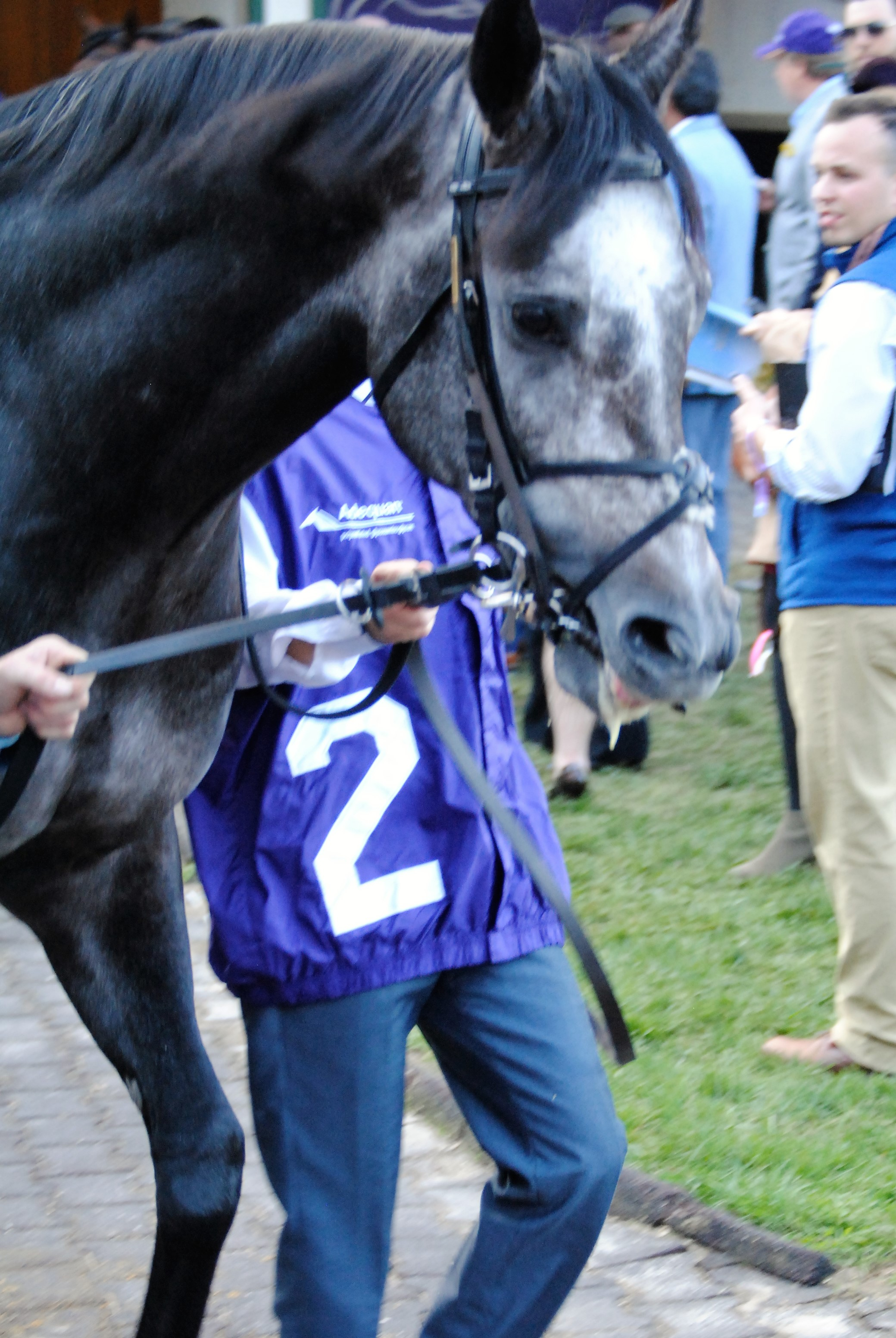
Roaring Lion at the 2018 Breeders' Cup

The Irish Champion Stakes over ten furlongs at Leopardstown Racecourse on 15 September saw Roaring Lion start the 8/11 favourite ahead of his old rival Saxon Warrior in their sixth meeting. The other five runners were Rhododendron, Study of Man (Prix du Jockey Club), Verbal Dexterity (National Stakes), Deauville (Belmont Derby) and Athena (Belmont Oaks). Murphy held the colt up towards the rear before switching to the outside to make his challenge in the last quarter mile by which point Saxon Warrior had established a clear advantage. Roaring Lion produced a strong late run, caught Saxon Warrior in the final strides and won by a neck. Oisin Murphy, who had very little prior experience of top-class race-riding in Ireland said "Once he got rolling I was always going to get there but I had to really get after him. I haven't much experience around Leopardstown. I was learning on the job. But I was on an exceptional horse".

Roaring Lion was aimed at one of the major races on British Champions' Day at Ascot on 20 October with his connections eventually opting drop the colt back in distance for the Queen Elizabeth II Stakes over one mile rather than contest the Champion Stakes. He started the 2/1 favourite ahead of Recoletos (Prix du Moulin) and Laurens while the other ten runners included Addeybb, Lord Glitters, Lightning Spear and Romanised. Racing on soft ground he settled in mid-division as Hay Gaman set the pace Roaring Lion began to make progress down the centre of the track in the last quarter mile, he gained the advantage from the outsider Century Dream inside the final furlong and held off the challenge of the Irish filly I Can Fly to win by a neck. Gosden said "He has proven his class and his guts to get there, but I think he was hating every second of running on that ground. You could see from his action and the way he was carrying himself. I would not work him on that ground". After the race it was announced that the colt would be retired to his owner's Tweenhills Stud in Gloucestershire at the end of the year.

For his final race, Roaring Lion was sent to the United States to contest the Breeders' Cup Classic on dirt at Churchill Downs on 3 November and started the 8/1 fifth choice in the betting. After racing in mid-division he dropped out of contention in the last half mile and finished tailed-off last of the fourteen runners.

At the 2018 Cartier Awards, Roaring Lion was named Champion Three-year-old Colt and European Horse of the Year. In the 2018 World's Best Racehorse Rankings Roaring Lion was rated the best three-year-old in the world and the fourth best horse of any age or sex.

== Stud career ==
Roaring Lion began his career as a stallion at Tweenhills Stud in Gloucestershire in 2019. His stud fee for his first season was announced in November 2018 as £40,000. In 2019, having covered 133 mares in Europe, he was shuttled to the Cambridge Stud in New Zealand for the southern hemisphere breeding season. In early August, shortly after leaving quarantine, Roaring Lion became seriously ill with horse colic and underwent surgery twice to remove sections of his small intestine. On 23 August he was found to be suffering from another bout of colic and was euthanized at the Cambridge Equine hospital.

=== Notable progeny ===
c = colt, f = filly, g = gelding

Foaled	Name	Sex	Major Wins
2020	Dubai Mile	c	Critérium de Saint-Cloud
2020	Kingswood	c	Coongy Cup, Zabeel Classic, Caulfield Cup, Zipping Classic

== Pedigree ==
Pedigree of Roaring Lion (USA), grey horse, 2015
Sire Kitten's Joy (USA) 2001	El Prado (IRE); 1989	Sadler's Wells	Northern Dancer
Sire Kitten's Joy (USA) 2001	El Prado (IRE); 1989	Sadler's Wells	Fairy Bridge
Sire Kitten's Joy (USA) 2001	El Prado (IRE); 1989	Lady Capulet	Sir Ivor
Sire Kitten's Joy (USA) 2001	El Prado (IRE); 1989	Lady Capulet	Cap and Bells
Sire Kitten's Joy (USA) 2001	Kitten's First (USA); 1991	Lear Fan	Roberto
Sire Kitten's Joy (USA) 2001	Kitten's First (USA); 1991	Lear Fan	Wac
Sire Kitten's Joy (USA) 2001	Kitten's First (USA); 1991	That's My Hon	L'Enjoleur
Sire Kitten's Joy (USA) 2001	Kitten's First (USA); 1991	That's My Hon	One Lane
Dam Vionnet (USA) 2009	Street Sense (USA); 2004	Street Cry	Machiavellian
Dam Vionnet (USA) 2009	Street Sense (USA); 2004	Street Cry	Helen Street
Dam Vionnet (USA) 2009	Street Sense (USA); 2004	Bedazzle	Dixieland Band
Dam Vionnet (USA) 2009	Street Sense (USA); 2004	Bedazzle	Majestic Legend
Dam Vionnet (USA) 2009	Cambiocorsa (USA); 2002	Avenue of Flags	Seattle Slew
Dam Vionnet (USA) 2009	Cambiocorsa (USA); 2002	Avenue of Flags	Beautiful Glass
Dam Vionnet (USA) 2009	Cambiocorsa (USA); 2002	Ultrafleet	Afleet
Dam Vionnet (USA) 2009	Cambiocorsa (USA); 2002	Ultrafleet	Social Conduct (Family: 9-f)
