= 2019 British Champions Series =

Ninth edition of the horse racing series comprising 35 of the UK's top flat races

- Sport: Horse racing
- Duration: 4 May – 19 October 2019

Leading Horses
- Highest Rated: Crystal Ocean (128); Enable (128)

Leading Jockey
- Winner: Frankie Dettori
- Win / 2nd / 3rd: 14 / 3 / 1

Leading Trainer
- Winner: John Gosden
- Win / 2nd / 3rd: 12 / 3 / 3

Seasons
- ← 2018 2020 →

The 2019 British Champions Series, sponsored by QIPCO, was the ninth edition of the horse racing series comprising 35 of the UK's top flat races. The series began with the 2,000 Guineas at Newmarket on 4 May, and concluded with British Champions Day at Ascot on 19 October.

== Results ==
The series was split into five categories: Sprint, Mile, Middle Distance, Long Distance and Fillies & Mares. Each category included seven races.

=== Sprint ===
Race	Date	Distance	Course	1st	2nd	3rd
King's Stand Stakes	18 June	5 furlongs	Ascot	Blue Point; James Doyle – Charlie Appleby	Battaash; Jim Crowley – Charles Hills	Soldier's Call; Daniel Tudhope – Archie Watson
Commonwealth Cup	21 June	6 furlongs	Ascot	Advertise; Frankie Dettori – Martyn Meade	Forever In Dreams; Oisin Murphy – Aidan Fogarty	Hello Youmzain; Kevin Stott – Kevin Ryan
Diamond Jubilee Stakes	22 June	6 furlongs	Ascot	Blue Point; James Doyle – Charlie Appleby	Dream Of Dreams; Daniel Tudhope – Michael Stoute	Kachy; Richard Kingscote – Tom Dascombe
July Cup	13 July	6 furlongs	Newmarket	Ten Sovereigns; Ryan Moore – Aidan O'Brien	Advertise; Frankie Dettori – Martyn Meade	Fairyland; Seamie Heffernan – Aidan O'Brien
Nunthorpe Stakes	23 August	5 furlongs	York	Battaash; Jim Crowley – Charles Hills	Soldier's Call; Daniel Tudhope – Archie Watson	So Perfect; Wayne Lordan – Aidan O'Brien
Sprint Cup	7 September	6 furlongs	Haydock	Hello Youmzain; James Doyle – Kevin Ryan	The Tin Man; Oisin Murphy – James Fanshawe	Waldpfad; Andrea Atzeni – Dominik Moser
British Champions; Sprint Stakes	19 October	6 furlongs	Ascot	Donjuan Triumphant; Silvestre de Sousa – Andrew Balding	One Master; Pierre-Charles Boudot – William Haggas	Forever In Dreams; Jamie Spencer – Aidan Fogarty

=== Mile ===
Race	Date	Distance	Course	1st	2nd	3rd
2,000 Guineas	4 May	1 mile	Newmarket	Magna Grecia; Donnacha O'Brien – Aidan O'Brien	King of Change; Sean Levey – Richard Hannon	Skardu; James Doyle – William Haggas
Lockinge Stakes	18 May	1 mile	Newbury	Mustashry; Jim Crowley – Michael Stoute	Laurens; P. J. McDonald – Karl Burke	Accidental Agent; Charles Bishop – Eve Johnson Houghton
Queen Anne Stakes	18 June	1 mile	Ascot	Lord Glitters; Daniel Tudhope – David O'Meara	Beat The Bank; Silvestre de Sousa – Andrew Balding	One Master; Pierre-Charles Boudot – William Haggas
St James's Palace Stakes	18 June	1 mile	Ascot	Circus Maximus; Ryan Moore – Aidan O'Brien	King Of Comedy; Adam Kirby – John Gosden	Too Darn Hot; Frankie Dettori – John Gosden
Sussex Stakes	31 July	1 mile	Goodwood	Too Darn Hot; Frankie Dettori – John Gosden	Circus Maximus; Ryan Moore – Aidan O'Brien	I Can Fly; Donnacha O'Brien – Aidan O'Brien
Sun Chariot Stakes	5 October	1 mile	Newmarket	Billesdon Brook; Sean Levey – Richard Hannon	Veracious; Oisin Murphy – Michael Stoute	Iridessa; Donnacha O'Brien – Joseph O'Brien
Queen Elizabeth II Stakes	19 October	1 mile	Ascot	King of Change; Sean Levey – Richard Hannon	The Revenant; Pierre-Charles Boudot – F-H Graffard	Safe Voyage; Jamie Spencer – John Quinn

=== Middle Distance ===
Race	Date	Distance	Course	1st	2nd	3rd
Coronation Cup	31 May	1 mile 4 furlongs	Epsom	Defoe; Andrea Atzeni – Roger Varian	Kew Gardens; Ryan Moore – Aidan O'Brien	Salouen; Oisin Murphy – Sylvester Kirk
Epsom Derby	1 June	1 mile 4 furlongs	Epsom	Anthony Van Dyck; Seamie Heffernan – Aidan O'Brien	Madhmoon; Chris Hayes – Kevin Prendergast	Japan; Wayne Lordan – Aidan O'Brien
Prince of Wales's Stakes	19 June	1 mile 2 furlongs	Ascot	Crystal Ocean; Frankie Dettori – Michael Stoute	Magical; Ryan Moore – Aidan O'Brien	Waldgeist; Pierre-Charles Boudot – André Fabre
Eclipse Stakes	6 July	1 mile 2 furlongs	Sandown	Enable; Frankie Dettori – John Gosden	Magical; Ryan Moore – Aidan O'Brien	Regal Reality; Kerrin McEvoy – Michael Stoute
King George VI & Queen Elizabeth Stakes	27 July	1 mile 4 furlongs	Ascot	Enable; Frankie Dettori – John Gosden	Crystal Ocean; James Doyle – Michael Stoute	Waldgeist; Pierre-Charles Boudot – André Fabre
International Stakes	21 August	1 mile 2½ furlongs	York	Japan; Ryan Moore – Aidan O'Brien	Crystal Ocean; James Doyle – Michael Stoute	Elarqam; Jim Crowley – Mark Johnston
Champion Stakes	19 October	1 mile 2 furlongs	Ascot	Magical; Donnacha O'Brien – Aidan O'Brien	Addeybb; James Doyle – William Haggas	Deirdre; Oisin Murphy – Mitsuru Hashida

=== Long Distance ===
Race	Date	Distance	Course	1st	2nd	3rd
Yorkshire Cup	17 May	1 mile 6 furlongs	York	Stradivarius; Frankie Dettori – John Gosden	Southern France; Ryan Moore – Aidan O'Brien	Mildenberger; Silvestre de Sousa – Mark Johnston
Ascot Gold Cup	20 June	2 miles 4 furlongs	Ascot	Stradivarius; Frankie Dettori – John Gosden	Dee Ex Bee; Silvestre de Sousa – Mark Johnston	Master Of Reality; Wayne Lordan – Joseph O'Brien
Goodwood Cup	30 July	2 miles	Goodwood	Stradivarius; Frankie Dettori – John Gosden	Dee Ex Bee; Silvestre de Sousa – Mark Johnston	Cross Counter; James Doyle – Charlie Appleby
Lonsdale Cup	23 August	2 miles ½ furlong	York	Stradivarius; Frankie Dettori – John Gosden	Dee Ex Bee; Silvestre de Sousa – Mark Johnston	Il Paradiso; Wayne Lordan – Aidan O'Brien
Doncaster Cup	13 September	2 miles 2 furlongs	Doncaster	Stradivarius; Frankie Dettori – John Gosden	Cleonte; Oisin Murphy – Andrew Balding	Max Dynamite; Ryan Moore – Willie Mullins
St Leger Stakes	14 September	1 mile 6½ furlongs	Doncaster	Logician; Frankie Dettori – John Gosden	Sir Ron Priestley; Franny Norton – Mark Johnston	Nayef Road; Andrea Atzeni – Mark Johnston
British Champions; Long Distance Cup	19 October	2 miles	Ascot	Kew Gardens; Donnacha O'Brien – Aidan O'Brien	Stradivarius; Frankie Dettori – John Gosden	Royal Line; Robert Havlin – John Gosden

=== Fillies & Mares ===
Race	Date	Distance	Course	1st	2nd	3rd
1,000 Guineas	5 May	1 mile	Newmarket	Hermosa; Wayne Lordan – Aidan O'Brien	Lady Kaya; Robbie Colgan – Sheila Lavery	Qabala; David Egan – Roger Varian
Epsom Oaks	31 May	1 mile 4 furlongs	Epsom	Anapurna; Frankie Dettori – John Gosden	Pink Dogwood; Ryan Moore – Aidan O'Brien	Fleeting; Wayne Lordan – Aidan O'Brien
Coronation Stakes	21 June	1 mile	Ascot	Watch Me; Pierre-Charles Boudot – F-H Graffard	Hermosa; Ryan Moore – Aidan O'Brien	Jubiloso; James McDonald – Michael Stoute
Falmouth Stakes	12 July	1 mile	Newmarket	Veracious; Oisin Murphy – Michael Stoute	One Master; James Doyle – William Haggas	I Can Fly; Ryan Moore – Aidan O'Brien
Nassau Stakes	1 August	1 mile 2 furlongs	Goodwood	Deirdre; Oisin Murphy – Mitsuru Hashida	Mehdaayih; Frankie Dettori – John Gosden	Rawdaa; Daniel Tudhope – Michael Stoute
Yorkshire Oaks	22 August	1 mile 4 furlongs	York	Enable; Frankie Dettori – John Gosden	Magical; Ryan Moore – Aidan O'Brien	Lah Ti Dar; William Buick – John Gosden
British Champions; Fillies & Mares Stakes	19 October	1 mile 4 furlongs	Ascot	Star Catcher; Frankie Dettori – John Gosden	Delphinia; Seamie Heffernan – Aidan O'Brien	Sun Maiden; Jim Crowley – Michael Stoute

== See also ==
- 2019 Epsom Derby
- 2019 King George VI and Queen Elizabeth Stakes
- 2019 Breeders' Cup Challenge series
