= King of Change =

Racehorse trained in Britain

- Racing silks of Ali Abdulla Saeed
- Sire: Farhh
- Grandsire: Pivotal
- Dam: Salacia
- Damsire: Echo of Light
- Sex: Colt
- Foaled: 20 March 2016
- Country: United Kingdom
- Colour: Bay
- Breeder: Rabbah Bloodstock
- Owner: Ali Abdulla Saeed
- Trainer: Richard Hannon Jr.
- Record: 6: 3-3-0
- Earnings: £766,139

Major wins
- Fortune Stakes (2018); Queen Elizabeth II Stakes (2019)

King of Change (foaled 20 March 2016) is a British Thoroughbred racehorse. After finishing second in both of his starts as a two-year-old in 2018 he developed into a top-class miler in the following year, finishing second in the 2000 Guineas and then returning from a lengthy absence to win the Fortune Stakes and the Queen Elizabeth II Stakes. He never raced again and was retired to stud in September 2020.

== Background ==
King of Change is a bay colt bred in England by Rabbah Bloodstock. He raced in the colours of Ali Abdulla Saeed, one of Rabbah Bloodstock's associates. He was sent into training with Richard Hannon Jr. at East Everleigh in Wiltshire.

He was from the second crop of foals sired by Farhh who won the Lockinge Stakes and the Champion Stakes in 2013. King of Change's dam Salacia showed modest racing ability, winning one minor race from six starts but made a promising start to her career as a broodmare by producing the Diomed Stakes winner Century Dream.

== Racing career ==
=== 2018: two-year-old season ===
King of Change made his track debut in a maiden race over eight and a half furlongs at Nottingham Racecourse on 31 October in which he started at odds of 12/1 and finished second, beaten half a length by the favourite Dalaalaat. On 17 November on the synthetic Tapeta track at Wolverhampton Racecourse the colt started 13/8 favourite for a novice race (for horses for no more than two previous wins) over nine and a half furlongs. Ridden as on his debut by Tom Marquand he tracked the leaders before taking the lead in the final furlong but was caught on the line and beaten a short head by the Roger Varian-trained Mackaar.

=== 2019: three-year-old season ===
King of Change was ridden in all of his races as a three-year-old by Sean Levey. On his first appearance of the season in a novice race at Nottingham on 10 April he recorded his first success as he won by two and a half lengths from King Ademir and ten others. The colt was then stepped up sharply in class to contest the 2000 Guineas over the Rowley Mile at Newmarket Racecourse. Starting a 66/1 outsider he was in contention from the start and kept on well to finish second to Magna Grecia with Ten Sovereigns, Royal Marine and Advertise finishing behind.

After a break of over four months King of Change returned to the track in the Listed Fortune Stakes over one mile at Sandown Park on 16 September in which he was matched against older horses for the first time. After tracking the leaders he went to the front approaching the final furlong and won by one and a quarter lengths from Turgenev. On 19 October King of Change faced fifteen opponents in the Queen Elizabeth II Stakes on heavy ground over the straight mile course at Ascot Racecourse. Benbatl started favourite while the other contenders included Magna Grecia, The Revenant (Prix Daniel Wildenstein), Lord Glitters, Accidental Agent, Phoenix of Spain and Veracious. King of Change raced in mid-division as Veracious set the pace before breaking through the pack to take the lead a furlong from the finish. Despite hanging to the left in the closing stages he kept on strongly to win by one and a quarter lengths from The Revenant. Sean Levey commented "When he ran in the Guineas people thought it was a bit of a fluke. But when he came in the autumn he was a massive stamp of a horse. We were worried about the ground but the way he's been working all he had to do was handle it. I said to Richard that I'd ridden Toronado and Sky Lantern at home and neither of them gave me a feel like him."

King of Change remained in training as a four-year-old but never returned to the track and was officially retired from racing in September 2020.

== Stud career ==
King of Change began his career as a breeding stallion at the Derrinstown Stud in Ireland, standing at an initial stud fee of €7,000.

== Pedigree ==
Pedigree of King of Change (GB), bay colt, 2016
Sire Farhh (GB) 2008	Pivotal (GB); 1993	Polar Falcon (USA)	Nureyev
Sire Farhh (GB) 2008	Pivotal (GB); 1993	Polar Falcon (USA)	Marie d'Argonne (FR)
Sire Farhh (GB) 2008	Pivotal (GB); 1993	Fearless Revival	Cozzene (USA)
Sire Farhh (GB) 2008	Pivotal (GB); 1993	Fearless Revival	Stufida
Sire Farhh (GB) 2008	Gonbarda (GER); 2002	Lando	Acatenango
Sire Farhh (GB) 2008	Gonbarda (GER); 2002	Lando	Laurea (IRE)
Sire Farhh (GB) 2008	Gonbarda (GER); 2002	Gonfalon (GB)	Slip Anchor
Sire Farhh (GB) 2008	Gonbarda (GER); 2002	Gonfalon (GB)	Grimpola (GER)
Dam Salacia (IRE) 2009	Echo of Light (GB); 2002	Dubai Millennium	Seeking The Gold (USA)
Dam Salacia (IRE) 2009	Echo of Light (GB); 2002	Dubai Millennium	Colorado Dancer (IRE)
Dam Salacia (IRE) 2009	Echo of Light (GB); 2002	Spirit of Tara (IRE)	Sadler's Wells (USA)
Dam Salacia (IRE) 2009	Echo of Light (GB); 2002	Spirit of Tara (IRE)	Flame of Tara
Dam Salacia (IRE) 2009	Neptune's Bride (USA); 1996	Bering (GB)	Arctic Tern (USA)
Dam Salacia (IRE) 2009	Neptune's Bride (USA); 1996	Bering (GB)	Beaune (FR)
Dam Salacia (IRE) 2009	Neptune's Bride (USA); 1996	Wedding of the Sea	Blushing Groom (FR)
Dam Salacia (IRE) 2009	Neptune's Bride (USA); 1996	Wedding of the Sea	Sweet Mover (Family 4-r)
