= 2019 King George VI and Queen Elizabeth Stakes =

69th King George VI and Queen Elizabeth Stakes
- King George VI and Queen Elizabeth Stakes
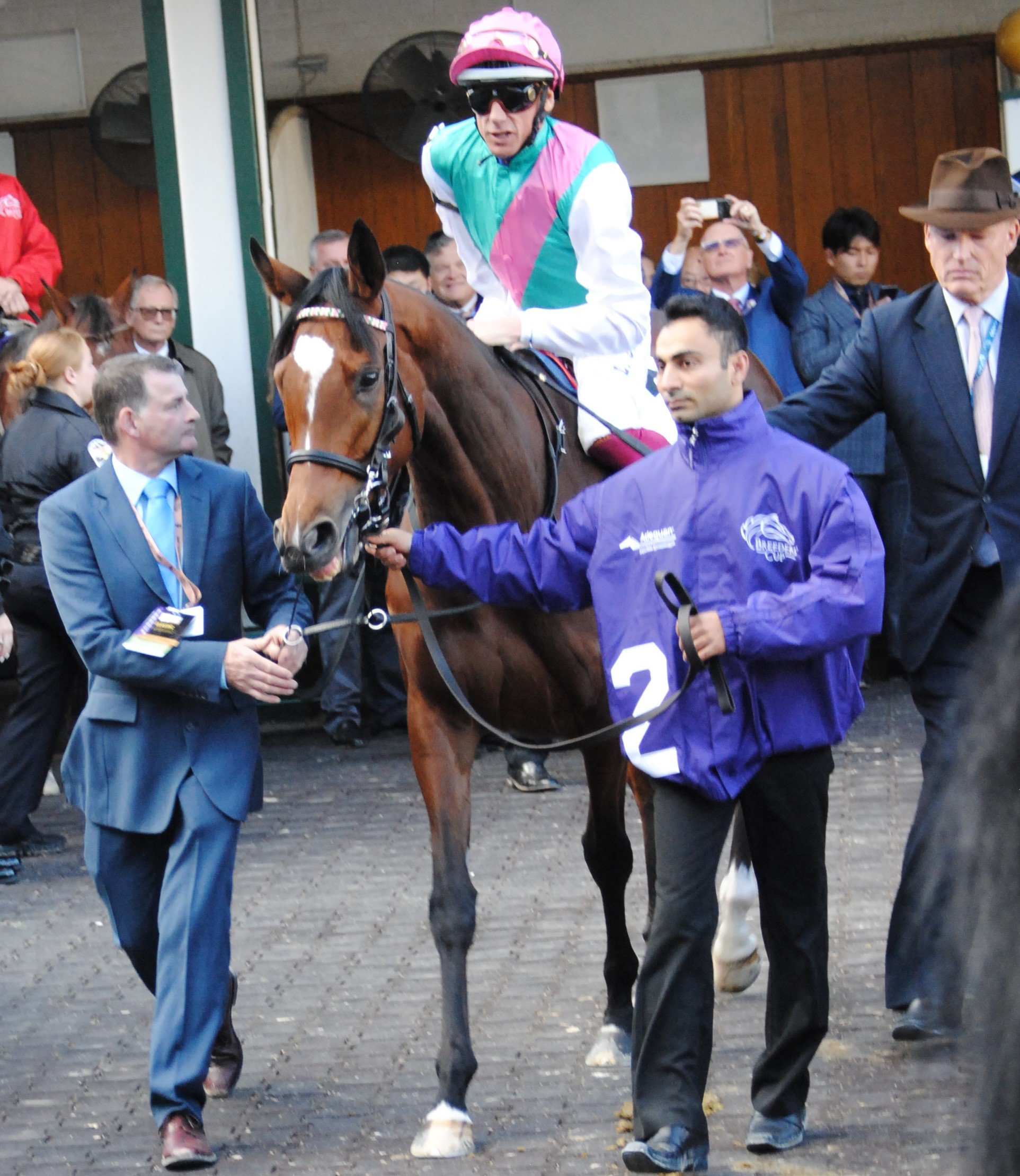
- Enable at the 2018 Breeders' Cup
- Location: Ascot Racecourse
- Date: 27 July 2019
- Winning horse: Enable
- Starting price: 8/15
- Jockey: Frankie Dettori
- Trainer: John Gosden
- Owner: Khalid Abullah

The 2019 King George VI and Queen Elizabeth Stakes was a horse race held at Ascot Racecourse on Saturday 27 July 2019. It was the 69th running of the King George VI and Queen Elizabeth Stakes.

The winner was Enable, a five-year-old bay mare trained at Newmarket by John Gosden, ridden by Frankie Dettori and owned by Khalid Abdullah. Enable's victory was the sixth in the race for Dettori, the fourth for Gosden and the third for Khalid Abdullah. Enable became the third horse after Dahlia and Swain to win the King George twice, and the first to win the race in non-consecutive years. She was the second five-year-old mare to win the race after Park Top in 1969.

== The contenders ==
The race attracted a field of eleven runners, five from England and four from Ireland, one from France and one from Japan.

The favourite for the race was Enable, a five-year-old mare who had won the race as a three-year-old in 2017 and had won two editions of the Prix de l'Arc de Triomphe in the interim. On her most recent start she had won the Eclipse Stakes. Her main threat appeared to come from Crystal Ocean who had been narrowly beaten in the 2018 edition of the race and had won the Prince of Wales's Stakes on his last appearance. Crystal Ocean was rated the best racehorse in the world in the July edition of the World's Best Racehorse Rankings. Another major contender was the improving five-year-old gelding Defoe who had won the Coronation Cup and the Hardwicke Stakes in his last two starts. The other two British-trained runners were Salouen, who was contesting the race for the third time and the Ormonde Stakes winner Morando.

Ireland was represented by the four-horse entry from Aidan O'Brien's Ballydoyle stable headed by the Epsom Derby winner Anthony Van Dyck. The other Ballydoyle contenders were Magic Wand (Ribblesdale Stakes), Hunting Horn (Hampton Court Stakes) and Norway (third in the Irish Derby). The French challenger was Waldgeist a winner of three Group 1 races while Japan's entry was the 2017 Japan Cup winner Cheval Grand.

Enable was made the 8/15 favourite ahead of Crystal Ocean on 7/2, Anthony Van Dyck on 7/1, Defoe on 10/1 and Waldgeist on 12/1.

== The race ==
Norway took the early lead and set a "blistering" pace from Magic Wand, Hunting Horn and Anthony Van Dyck. Crystal Ocean and Waldgeist raced in mid-division while Enable, who had been drawn on the wide outside settled towards the rear of the field. The leading group began to tire approaching the final turn and Crystal Ocean moved up on the outside to take the lead in the straight, closely followed by Enable and Waldgeist. The last quarter mile saw a sustained struggle between Crystal Ocean and Enable before the mare prevailed by a neck. Waldgeist was a length and three quarters back in third with the others finishing well strung out. Salouen got the better of Hunting Horn for fourth, with Cheval Grand taking sixth ahead of Norway while the remainder were tailed off.

== Race details ==
- Sponsor: QIPCO
- Purse: £1,229,625; First prize: £708,875
- Surface: Turf
- Going: Good to Soft
- Distance: 12 furlongs
- Number of runners: 11
- Winner's time: 2:32.42

== Full result ==
Pos.	Marg.	Horse (bred)	Age	Jockey	Trainer (Country)	Odds
1		Enable (GB)	5	Frankie Dettori	John Gosden (GB)	8/15
2	nk	Crystal Ocean (GB)	5	James Doyle	Michael Stoute (GB)	7/2
3	1¾	Waldgeist (GB)	5	Pierre-Charles Boudot	André Fabre (FR)	12/1
4	7	Salouen (IRE)	5	Jim Crowley	Sylvester Kirk (GB)	80/1
5	nk	Hunting Horn (IRE)	4	Seamie Heffernan	Aidan O'Brien (IRE)	66/1
6	3½	Cheval Grand (JPN)	7	Oisin Murphy	Yasuo Tomomichi (JPN)	33/1
7	7	Norway (IRE)	3	Wayne Lordan	Aidan O'Brien (IRE)	66/1
8	14	Morando (FR)	6	P. J. McDonald	Andrew Balding (GB)	66/1
9	nk	Defoe (IRE)	5	Andrea Atzeni	Roger Varian (GB)	10/1
10	5	Anthony Van Dyck (IRE)	3	Ryan Moore	Aidan O'Brien (IRE)	7/1
11	11	Magic Wand (IRE)	4	Donnacha O'Brien	Aidan O'Brien (IRE)	28/1

- Abbreviations: nse = nose; nk = neck; shd = head; hd = head

== Winner's details ==
Further details of the winner, Enable

- Sex: Mare
- Foaled: 12 February 2014
- Country: United Kingdom
- Sire: Nathaniel
- Owner: Khalid Abullah
- Breeder: Juddmonte Farms

== See also ==
- 2019 British Champions Series
