= Fairyland (horse) =

Irish Thoroughbred racehorse

- Racing silks of Mr Derrick Smith and Mrs E M Stockwell
- Sire: Kodiac
- Grandsire: Danehill
- Dam: Queenofthefairies
- Damsire: Pivotal
- Sex: Filly
- Foaled: 14 January 2016
- Country: Ireland
- Colour: Bay
- Breeder: Tally-Ho Stud
- Owner: Evie Stockwell, Michael Tabor, Derrick Smith & Sue Magnier
- Trainer: Aidan O'Brien
- Record: 13: 5-0-2
- Earnings: £647,483

Major wins
- Marble Hill Stakes (2018); Lowther Stakes (2018); Cheveley Park Stakes (2018); Flying Five Stakes (2019)

Fairyland (foaled 14 January 2016) is an Irish Thoroughbred racehorse. She was one of the best two-year-old fillies in Europe in 2018 when her wins included the Marble Hill Stakes, Lowther Stakes and Cheveley Park Stakes. In the following year she won the Flying Five Stakes and ran well in several major sprint races.

== Background ==
Fairyland is a bay filly with a white star bred in Ireland by the Tally-Ho Stud. In October 2017 the yearling filly was offered for sale at Tattersalls and was bought for 925,000 guineas by Michael Magnier of behalf of his father, John Magnier's Coolmore Stud organisation. The filly was sent into training with Aidan O'Brien at Ballydoyle. Like many Coolmore horses, the official details of her ownership changed from race to race: he has sometimes been listed as being the property of Evie Stockwell (John Magnier's mother), while on other occasions she was described as being owned by a partnership comprising Stockwell, Derrick Smith and Michael Tabor.

She was sired by Kodiac, a sprinter who won four minor races from twenty starts and finished second in the Hackwood Stakes and fourth in the Prix Maurice de Gheest. His other foals have included Tiggy Wiggy, Best Solution (Grosser Preis von Baden) Gifted Master (Stewards' Cup) and Kodi Bear (Celebration Mile). Fairyland's dam Queenofthefairies, a half-sister to Dream Ahead, did not race, but produced at least two other winners including Now Or Never (Derrinstown Stud 1,000 Guineas Trial). She is a distant female-line descendant of Cantrip, a full sister to the Epsom Derby winner Aboyeur.

== Racing career ==
=== 2018: two-year-old season ===
Fairyland was ridden by Ryan Moore when she made her racecourse debut in a six furlong maiden race at Naas Racecourse on 7 May and started at odds of 3/1 in a ten-runner field. She raced close to the leaders from the start, took the advantage a furlong from the finish and won "comfortably" by one and three quarter lengths. Nineteen days later the filly was stepped up in class and matched against male opposition in the Listed Marble Hill Stakes over the same distance at the Curragh in which she was partnered by Seamie Heffernan. After tracking the front-runners she took the lead in the last quarter mile and drew away to win by two and a half lengths and a neck from her stablemates Van Beethoven and Land Force. The second and third placed horses went on to win the Railway Stakes and the Richmond Stakes respectively. Heffernan was again in the saddle when the filly was sent to England to contest the Albany Stakes at Royal Ascot and started the 5/2 second favourite against seventeen opponents. Racing on the far side of the straight course (the right-hand side from the jockeys' view) she finished a close third behind Main Edition and La Pelosa, both of whom raced on the opposite side of the track. In the aftermath of the race she was reported to be "under the weather" as many of the Ballydoyle horses were affected by a viral infection.

After a break of two months, Fairyland returned for the Lowther Stakes at York Racecourse and started 6/4 favourite ahead of the Princess Margaret Stakes winner Angel's Hideaway. Ridden by Moore she led for most of the way and after being headed by The Mackem Bullet inside the furlong she rallied in the final strides to regain the advantage and win by a nose. After the race O'Brien said "I'm delighted with her. She did get headed so it was great to see her battle back... She's a lovely filly and [the Cheveley Park Stakes] is the way we'll be heading... she's a big, rangy filly – she looks more like a three-year-old than a two-year-old".

On 29 September Fairyland, ridden by Donnacha O'Brien, started at odds of 6/1 for the Group 1 Cheveley Park Stakes at Newmarket Racecourse. Her ten opponents included Pretty Pollyanna (winner of the Prix Morny), So Perfect (Grangecon Stud Stakes), Lady Kaya (second in the Moyglare Stud Stakes), Signora Cabello (Queen Mary Stakes, Prix Robert Papin), Queen of Bermuda (Firth of Clyde Stakes), Angel's Hideaway and The Mackem Bullet. After tracking the leaders she took the lead just inside the final furlong and kept on strongly to win by a neck from The Mackem Bullet with So Perfect half a length away in third place. Aidan O'Brien commented "We thought she would come forward from York and she did. She's a lovely, big filly and has loads of speed. Donnacha gave her a peach of a ride. We always thought she would maybe get a mile but she's not short of speed and has a lovely mind. We probably wouldn't run her again this season".

=== 2019: three-year-old season ===
On her three-year-old debut Fairyland was ridden by Frankie Dettori when she was one of fifteen fillies to contest the 1000 Guineas over the Rowley Mile at Newmarket on 5 May. Starting the 15/2 fifth choice in the betting she raced in mid-division before keeping well under pressure to finish fifth behind Hermosa, Lady Kaya, Qabala and Angel's Hideaway. In the Irish 1,000 Guineas at the Curragh she never looked likely to win and came home sixth behind Hermosa, beaten more than eight lengths by the winner. Fairyland was dropped back to sprint distances for the King's Stand Stakes over five furlongs at Royal Ascot and finished fifth behind Blue Point, Battaash, Soldier's Call and Mabs Cross. On her next race she contested the six-furlong July Cup at Newmarket in which she ran third to the colts Ten Sovereigns and Advertise.

In the Nunthorpe Stakes at York of 23 August Fairyland failed to recover from a poor start and trailed home tenth of the eleven runners in a race won by Battaash. The filly maintained her busy schedule in the Haydock Sprint Cup on 7 September when she ran sixth to Hello Youmzain beaten just over three lengths by the winner. Eight days after her defeat at Haydock Fairyland was partnered by Ryan Moore when she started at odds for 12/1 for the Group 1 Flying Five Stakes at the Curragh. Soffia (Sapphire Stakes) started favourite while the other seven runners included Mabs Cross, Soldier's Call, Houtzen (P J Bell Stakes), Invincible Army (Duke of York Stakes) and So Perfect (Lacken Stakes). After settling just behind the leaders Fairyland overtook the front-running outsider Caspian Prince approaching the final furlong and kept on well to hold off the late challenge of her stablemate So Perfect to win by a short head. O'Brien commented "Her best run of the year was back at five at Ascot in the King's Stand. The ground was too soft for her at Haydock and she got upset in the stalls and banged her head before that at York. You would have to be delighted."

Fairyland ran in France for the first time on 6 October when she contested the Prix de l'Abbaye over 1000 metres on very soft ground at Longchamp Racecourse but never looked likely to win and came home tenth behind Glass Slippers.

== Pedigree ==
Pedigree of Fairyland (IRE), bay filly, 2016
Sire Kodiac (GB) 2001	Danehill (USA); 1986	Danzig	Northern Dancer (CAN)
Sire Kodiac (GB) 2001	Danehill (USA); 1986	Danzig	Pas de Nom
Sire Kodiac (GB) 2001	Danehill (USA); 1986	Razyana	His Majesty
Sire Kodiac (GB) 2001	Danehill (USA); 1986	Razyana	Spring Adieu (CAN)
Sire Kodiac (GB) 2001	Rafha; 1987	Kris	Sharpen Up
Sire Kodiac (GB) 2001	Rafha; 1987	Kris	Doubly Sure
Sire Kodiac (GB) 2001	Rafha; 1987	Eljazzi (IRE)	Artaius (USA)
Sire Kodiac (GB) 2001	Rafha; 1987	Eljazzi (IRE)	Border Bounty (GB)
Dam Queenofthefairies (GB) 2007	Pivotal; 1993	Polar Falcon (USA)	Nureyev
Dam Queenofthefairies (GB) 2007	Pivotal; 1993	Polar Falcon (USA)	Marie d'Argonne (FR)
Dam Queenofthefairies (GB) 2007	Pivotal; 1993	Fearless Revival	Cozzene (USA)
Dam Queenofthefairies (GB) 2007	Pivotal; 1993	Fearless Revival	Stufida
Dam Queenofthefairies (GB) 2007	Land of Dreams; 1995	Cadeaux Genereux	Young Generation (IRE)
Dam Queenofthefairies (GB) 2007	Land of Dreams; 1995	Cadeaux Genereux	Smarten Up
Dam Queenofthefairies (GB) 2007	Land of Dreams; 1995	Sahara Star	Green Desert (USA)
Dam Queenofthefairies (GB) 2007	Land of Dreams; 1995	Sahara Star	Vaigly Star (Family 1-b)
