= Meydan Sprint =

Blue Point Sprint (formerly Meydan Sprint)
- Class: Group 2
- Location: Meydan Racecourse; Dubai, United Arab Emirates
- Inaugurated: 2012
- Race type: Thoroughbred - Flat racing

Race information
- Distance: 1,000 metres
- Surface: Turf
- Track: Straight
- Purse: $250,000

The Blue Point Sprint formerly Meydan Sprint, is a horse race run over a distance of 1,000 metres (five furlongs) on turf in February at Meydan Racecourse in Dubai. It was first contested in 2012.

The Meydan Sprint became a Listed race in 2013. The race was elevated to Group 3 level in 2013 and became a Group 2 event in 2019. Since 2022, it has been run as the Blue Point Sprint.

== Records ==
Record time:

- 0:55.90 - Ertijaal 2018

Most successful horse (2 wins):

- 2 - Shea Shea – 2013, 2014
- 2 - Ertijaal – 2017, 2018

Most wins by a jockey:

- 3 - Jim Crowley – 2017, 2018, 2020
- 3 - William Buick - 2019, 2022, 2026

Most wins by a trainer:

- 2 - Mike de Kock 2013, 2014
- 2 - Ali Al Rayhi 2017, 2018

Most wins by an owner:

- 4 - Hamdan Al Maktoum 2016, 2017, 2018, 2020

== Winners ==
Year	Winner	Age	Jockey	Trainer	Owner	Time
2012	Invincible Ash	7	Jamie Spencer	Mick Halford	P J Condron	0:59.28
2013	Shea Shea	5	Christophe Soumillon	Mike de Kock	Brian Joffee & Myron C Berzack	0:57.02
2014	Shea Shea	6	Christophe Soumillon	Mike de Kock	Brian Joffee & Myron C Berzack	0:57.07
2015	Sir Maximilian	4	Kieren Fallon	Ian Williams	Paul Wildes	0:57.10
2016	Fityaan	8	Paul Hanagan	Musabbeh Al Mheiri	Hamdan Al Maktoum	0:57.07
2017	Ertijaal	6	Jim Crowley	Ali Al Rayhi	Hamdan Al Maktoum	0:56.56
2018	Ertijaal	7	Jim Crowley	Ali Al Rayhi	Hamdan Al Maktoum	0:55.90
2019	Blue Point	5	William Buick	Charlie Appleby	Godolphin	0:56.52
2020	Waady	8	Jim Crowley	Doug Watson	Hamdan Al Maktoum	0:56.87
2021	Equilateral	6	Andrea Atzeni	Charles Hills	Mrs Fitri Hay	0:57.25
2022	Lazuli	6	William Buick	Charlie Appleby	Godolphin	0:56.95
2023	Miqyaas	8	Oscar Chavez	Rashed Bouresly	Bouresly Racing Syndicate	0:57.10
2024	Star Of Mystery	3	Mickael Barzalona	Charlie Appleby	Godolphin	0:56.14
2025	West Acre	3	Callum Shepherd	George Scott	Michael Blencowe	0:55.38
2026	Cover Up	6	William Buick	Simon & Ed Crisford	Khalifa Saeed Sulaiman	0:57.12

== See also ==
- List of United Arab Emirates horse races
