= Watch Me (horse) =

French Thoroughbred racehorse

- Sire: Olympic Glory
- Grandsire: Choisir
- Dam: Watchful
- Damsire: Galileo
- Sex: Filly
- Foaled: 18 March 2016
- Country: France
- Colour: Bay
- Breeder: Antoinette Tamagni & Cocheese Bloodstock Anstalt
- Owner: Alexander Tamagni-Bodmer & Regula Vannod
- Trainer: Francis-Henri Graffard
- Record: 9: 5-0-2
- Earnings: £554,216

Major wins
- Criterium du Languedoc (2018); Prix Imprudence (2019); Coronation Stakes (2019); Prix de la Calonne (2020); Prix Rothschild (2020)

Watch Me (foaled 18 March 2016) is a French Thoroughbred racehorse. As a two-year-old in 2018 she showed promise as she won the Listed Criterium du Languedoc on the second of her two starts. In the following year she won the Prix Imprudence and recorded her biggest win when she took the Group 1 Coronation Stakes at Royal Ascot. In 2020 she was unbeaten in two starts, namely the Prix de la Calonne and the Prix Rothschild.

== Background ==
Watch Me is a bay filly with a narrow white blaze bred in France by Antoinette Tamagni and Cocheese Bloodstock. In August 2017 the yearling filly was offered for sale at Deauville but failed to reach her reserve price of €30,000. She races in the colours of Tamagni's son Alexander Tamagni-Bodmer in partnership with Regula Vannod and was sent into training with Francis-Henri Graffard. The filly has been ridden in most of her races by Pierre-Charles Boudot.

She was from the first crop of foals sired by Olympic Glory, whose wins included the Prix Jean-Luc Lagardère, Queen Elizabeth II Stakes, Lockinge Stakes and Prix de la Forêt. Watch Me's dam Watchful showed modest racing ability, winning two minor races from four starts as a three-year-old in 2007. She was a granddaughter of the Prix Vermeille winner Sharaya making her a close relative of Shareta and Shawanda. She was descended from the British broodmare Aimee (foaled in 1957) whose other descendants have included Blushing Groom and King Kamehameha.

== Racing career ==
=== 2018: two-year-old season ===
Watch Me made her racecourse debut in a maiden race over 1600 meters at Saint-Cloud Racecourse on 11 October and disputed the lead for most of the way before finishing third behind So Unique and Ouzala, beaten one and a half lengths by the winner. On 10 November she was stepped up in class for the Listed Criterium du Languedoc over the same distance at Toulouse and went off at odds of 4.7/1 in a field of eight colts and fillies. Racing on heavy ground she recovered from a poor start to take the lead inside the final furlong and won "comfortably" by one and a quarter lengths from Go To Hollywood.

=== 2019: three-year-old season ===
On 10 April 2019 Watch Me began her second campaign in the Listed Prix Imprudence over 1400 metres at Maisons-Laffitte Racecourse in which she was partnered by Christophe Soumillon and started the 5.8/1 third choice in a field of seven. After being restrained in the early stages she made progress in the last 400 metres overtook the favourite Suphala in the closing stages and won by a short neck. The filly was ridden by Olivier Peslier when she was moved up to the highest class for the Group 1 Poule d'Essai des Pouliches over 1600 metres at Longchamp Racecourse on 12 May. She appeared to be making good progress when she was hampered in the closing stages and came home sixth of the ten runners behind Castle Lady.

In June Watch Me was sent to England and started a 20/1 outsider for the Coronation Stakes over one mile at Royal Ascot. Hermosa started favourite, while the other seven runners included Castle Lady, Pretty Pollyanna and the undefeated Jubiloso. After tracking the leaders, Boudot sent Watch Me into the lead approaching the final furlong and the French filly kept on well to defeat Hermosa by one and a half lengths. Her victory was enthusiastically celebrated by a contingent of flag-waving French supporters. Graffard said "She traveled really nicely, and I shouted a lot... I worked six years in England, so I always said to myself, 'I need to come here and win a big race.' I've tried before, but today is just amazing. I love this filly. I always thought she was very good, and it's incredible".

Watch Me returned to the track in August for the Prix Jacques Le Marois at Deauville Racecourse, a race which saw her matched against older horses for the first time. She was made the 2.1/1 favourite but was unable to quicken in the closing stages and finished fourth behind Romanised, Shaman and Line of Duty, beaten just over two and a half lengths by the winner. After another break the filly contested the Prix de l'Opéra over 2000 metres at Longchamp on 6 October in which she was repeatedly denied a clear run in the straight before coming home third behind Villa Marina and Fleeting.

=== 2020: four-year-old season ===
The flat racing season in Europe was restructured as a result of the COVID-19 outbreak and Watch Me made her first appearance in the Listed Prix de la Calonne which was run over 1600 metres behind closed doors at Deauville on 12 July. Starting the odds-on favourite against seven opponents she produced her "trademark kick" of acceleration to take the lead 400 metres from the finish and won by two and a half lengths from the 36/1 outsider Norma. Graffard commented: "I was very happy with her performance. I thought she had trained on well from three to four, she was training well and was happy to be back at the races – it was the perfect comeback."

Three weeks after her win in the Prix de la Calonne, Watch Me started the 0.7/1 favourite for the Group 1 Prix Rothschild over the same course and distance. Her five opponents were Summer Romance (Princess Elizabeth Stakes), Speak of the Devil (runner-up in the 2020 Poule d'Essai des Pouliches), Half Light (Hamburger Stutenmeile), Know It All (Derrinstown Stud Fillies Stakes) and Norma. Watch Me was settled in third place by Boudot before breaking through a narrow gap on the inside to take the lead approaching the last 200 metres and winning by three quarters of a length and a short head from Half Light and Know It All. After the race Boudot said: "She showed herself to be tenacious and a fighter. She's a filly that stays 2,000 meters, and that told in the final strides. We had a bit of luck because if I'd had to take back and come round, that would have made life pretty difficult. She's done it well today, and it's great to have her back at this level."

Five days after the Prix Rothschild Graffard announced that Watch Me had been retired from racing. He said "I wasn't completely happy with how she came out of the race. We spoke to the owners and we decided together that we should respect the filly [by retiring her]. It was a good way for her to finish – she proved she's a very good filly."

== Pedigree ==
Pedigree of Watch Me (FR), bay filly, 2016
Sire Olympic Glory (IRE) 2010	Choisir (AUS); 1999	Danehill Dancer (IRE)	Danehill (USA)
Sire Olympic Glory (IRE) 2010	Choisir (AUS); 1999	Danehill Dancer (IRE)	Mira Adonde (USA)
Sire Olympic Glory (IRE) 2010	Choisir (AUS); 1999	Great Selection	Lunchtime (GB)
Sire Olympic Glory (IRE) 2010	Choisir (AUS); 1999	Great Selection	Pensive Mood
Sire Olympic Glory (IRE) 2010	Acidanthera (GB); 1995	Alzao (USA)	Lyphard
Sire Olympic Glory (IRE) 2010	Acidanthera (GB); 1995	Alzao (USA)	Lady Rebecca (GB)
Sire Olympic Glory (IRE) 2010	Acidanthera (GB); 1995	Amaranthus	Shirley Heights
Sire Olympic Glory (IRE) 2010	Acidanthera (GB); 1995	Amaranthus	Amaranda (USA)
Dam Watchful (IRE) 2004	Galileo (IRE); 1998	Sadler's Wells (USA)	Northern Dancer (CAN)
Dam Watchful (IRE) 2004	Galileo (IRE); 1998	Sadler's Wells (USA)	Fairy Bridge
Dam Watchful (IRE) 2004	Galileo (IRE); 1998	Urban Sea (USA)	Miswaki
Dam Watchful (IRE) 2004	Galileo (IRE); 1998	Urban Sea (USA)	Allegretta (GB)
Dam Watchful (IRE) 2004	Sharakawa (IRE); 1990	Darshaan (GB)	Shirley Heights
Dam Watchful (IRE) 2004	Sharakawa (IRE); 1990	Darshaan (GB)	Delsy (FR)
Dam Watchful (IRE) 2004	Sharakawa (IRE); 1990	Sharaya (USA)	Youth
Dam Watchful (IRE) 2004	Sharakawa (IRE); 1990	Sharaya (USA)	Shanizadeh (IRE) (Family: 22-d)

- Watch Me was inbred 4 × 4 to Shirley Heights, meaning that this stallion appears twice in the fourth generation of her pedigree.
