= Skitter Scatter =

American-bred Thoroughbred racehorse

- Racing silks of Anthony Rogers & Mrs Sonia Rogers
- Sire: Scat Daddy
- Grandsire: Johannesburg
- Dam: Dane Street
- Damsire: Street Cry
- Sex: Filly
- Foaled: 4 April 2016
- Country: United States
- Colour: Bay
- Breeder: Three Chimneys Farm & Airlie Stud
- Owner: Anthony Rogers & Mrs Sonia Rogers
- Trainer: Patrick Prenderast
- Record: 10: 4-2-2
- Earnings: £304,538

Major wins
- Silver Flash Stakes (2018); Debutante Stakes (2018); Moyglare Stud Stakes (2018)

Awards
- Cartier Champion Two-year-old Filly (2018)

Skitter Scatter (foaled 4 April 2016) is an American-bred, Irish-trained Thoroughbred racehorse. In 2018, she won one minor race in her first four starts but then made rapid improvement to win the Silver Flash Stakes, Debutante Stakes and Moyglare Stud Stakes. At the end of the season she was named Cartier Champion Two-year-old Filly. She failed to win in three starts in 2019.

== Background ==
Skitter Scatter is a bay mare with a small white star bred in Kentucky by Three Chimneys Farm and the Irish-based Airlie Stud. After being withdrawn from the Keeneland yearling sale in September 2017, she was sent to Ireland and entered training with Patrick "P. J." Prendergast at Melitta Lodge, County Kildare. In 2018 she raced in the colours of the mother and son team of Sonia Rogers and Anthony Rogers of the Airlie Stud and was ridden in all of her races by Ronan Whelan.

She was sired by Scat Daddy, who won the Champagne Stakes in 2006 and the Florida Derby in 2007 before his racing career was ended by injury. Scat Daddy's other offspring include Justify, No Nay Never, Daddy Long Legs and Lady Aurelia. Skitter Scatter's dam Dane Street (a half-sister to Intense Focus) was an American-bred mare who raced in Ireland and showed modest racing ability, winning two minor races from eleven starts. As a descendant of the British broodmare Fanghorn she was also related to Soldier of Fortune, Double Form and Gran Criterium winner Sholokhov.

== Racing career ==
=== 2018: two-year-old season ===
Skitter Scatter began her racing career in a five furlong maiden race on the Polytrack surface at Dundalk Racecourse on 28 March and finished third of seven runners, beaten a neck and one and a half lengths by Jungle Jane and Romme. Two weeks later she started at odds of 5/1 for a maiden over the same course and distance and recorded her first success, defeating the Aidan O'Brien-trained colt Sergei Prokofiev by a short head. The runner-up went on to win the Rochestown Stakes and the Cornwallis Stakes. On 20 May the filly was stepped up in class and distance for the Listed Fillies' Sprint Stakes over six furlongs at Naas Racecourse. Starting at 8/1 she led in the early stages before being overtaken in the last quarter mile and came home third behind Servalan and Chicas Amigas, just ahead of the odds-on favourite So Perfect.

On 1 July Skitter Scatter started a 16/1 outsider for the Group 3 Grangecon Stud Stakes at the Curragh Racecourse and after disputing the lead for most of the way she was overhauled in the final strides and beaten half a length by So Perfect. At Leopardstown Racecourse at the end of the month the filly was moved up in distance for the Silver Flash Stakes over seven furlongs at started at odds of 10/1 in a six-runner field headed by the O'Brien trained Goddess. After being up with the leaders from the start, she went to the front two furlongs out, established a clear lead, and stayed on to win by one and a half lengths from Moravia. Ronan Whelan commented "She got a beautiful run throughout and I wasn’t concerned about the step up in trip, as she's more relentless than a quickener and I didn’t want to give her too much to do. I got to the front too soon, but she's tough and I knew they’d have to work to get to me." On 26 August Skitter Scatter was moved up to Group 2 class for the seven-furlong Debutante Stakes at the Curragh. Zagitova started favourite ahead of Lady Kaya and Viadera (runner-up in the Anglesey Stakes) with Skitter Scatter the 7/1 fourth choice in the betting alongside Hermosa. After tracking the leaders Skitter Scatter gained the advantage in the last quarter mile and won "comfortably" by two and a quarter lengths from the 50/1 outsider Bandiuc Eile. The subsequent Fillies' Mile winner Iridessa came home three lengths further back in fifth place.

The Group 1 Moyglare Stud Stakes over seven furlongs at the Curragh on 16 September saw Skitter Scatter start the 7/2 favourite against nine opponents. Bandiuc Eile, Zagitova, Hermosa and Lady Kaya were again in opposition while the others included Just Wonderful (Flame of Tara Stakes) and the British challengers Beyond Reason (Chesham Stakes, Prix du Calvados) and Main Edition (Albany Stakes, Sweet Solera Stakes). She was restrained by Whelan in the early stages before beginning to make progress in the last quarter mile. She took the lead inside the final furlong and pulled ahead to win by two lengths from Lady Kaya. After the race Patrick Prerdergast said "Coming here I thought this was a filly who could run well in a Guineas, now I think she could win it. I'm quite astounded at how good she is. I was worried coming into today because I'd felt it had been a long year for her. We just wanted to win her maiden, that was my brief and it's incredible that she has just kept going and improving. I was also worried that she has finally started to grow – she's not going to be so small next year."

At the 2018 Cartier Awards, Skitter Scatter was named Champion Two-year-old Filly.

=== 2019: three-year-old season ===
For the 2019 season Skitter Scatter was moved to the stable of John Oxx although Whelan remained her regular jockey. On her three-year-old debut the filly started at odds of 7/1 in fifteen-runner field for the 206th running of the 1000 Guineas on 5 May at Newmarket Racecourse but made little impact and finished towards the rear in a race won by Hermosa. After a lengthy break Skitter Scatter returned on 29 August and started 5/2 favourite for the Group 3 Fairy Bridge Stakes over seven and a half furlongs at Tipperary Racecourse. She took the lead inside the final furlong but was run down by the four-year-old Waitingfortheday and beaten half a length into second place. At Leopardstown on 14 September the filly started at odds of 14/1 for the Matron Stakes and came home a distant last of the seven runners.

== Pedigree ==
Pedigree of Skitter Scatter, bay filly, 2016
Sire Scat Daddy (USA) 2004	Johannesburg; 1999	Hennessy	Storm Cat
Sire Scat Daddy (USA) 2004	Johannesburg; 1999	Hennessy	Island Kitty
Sire Scat Daddy (USA) 2004	Johannesburg; 1999	Myth	Ogygian
Sire Scat Daddy (USA) 2004	Johannesburg; 1999	Myth	Yarn
Sire Scat Daddy (USA) 2004	Love Style; 1999	Mr. Prospector	Raise a Native
Sire Scat Daddy (USA) 2004	Love Style; 1999	Mr. Prospector	Gold Digger
Sire Scat Daddy (USA) 2004	Love Style; 1999	Likeable Style	Nijinsky (CAN)
Sire Scat Daddy (USA) 2004	Love Style; 1999	Likeable Style	Personable Lady
Dam Dane Street (USA) 2009	Street Cry (IRE); 1998	Machiavellian (USA)	Mr. Prospector
Dam Dane Street (USA) 2009	Street Cry (IRE); 1998	Machiavellian (USA)	Coup de Folie
Dam Dane Street (USA) 2009	Street Cry (IRE); 1998	Helen Street (GB)	Troy
Dam Dane Street (USA) 2009	Street Cry (IRE); 1998	Helen Street (GB)	Waterway (FR)
Dam Dane Street (USA) 2009	Daneleta (IRE); 1999	Danehill (USA)	Danzig
Dam Dane Street (USA) 2009	Daneleta (IRE); 1999	Danehill (USA)	Razyana
Dam Dane Street (USA) 2009	Daneleta (IRE); 1999	Zavaleta	Kahyasi
Dam Dane Street (USA) 2009	Daneleta (IRE); 1999	Zavaleta	La Meilleure (Family:14-c)
