= Hermosa (horse) =

Irish-bred Thoroughbred racehorse

- Racing silks of Michael Tabor
- Sire: Galileo
- Grandsire: Sadler's Wells
- Dam: Beauty Is Truth
- Damsire: Pivotal
- Sex: Filly
- Foaled: 6 May 2016
- Country: Ireland
- Colour: Bay
- Breeder: Beauty Is Truth Syndicate
- Owner: Susan Magnier, Michael Tabor & Derrick Smith
- Trainer: Aidan O'Brien
- Record: 13: 4-4-1
- Earnings: £892,338

Major wins
- Weld Park Stakes (2018); 1000 Guineas (2019); Irish 1000 Guineas (2019)
- Last updated on 6 October 2019

Hermosa (foaled 6 May 2016) is an Irish Thoroughbred racehorse. She showed very good form as a juvenile in 2018 when she won two of her seven races including the Weld Park Stakes as well as finishing second in both the Fillies' Mile and the Critérium International and third in the Moyglare Stud Stakes. She improved in the following spring to record Group 1 victories in the 1000 Guineas and the Irish 1000 Guineas.

== Background ==
Hermosa (Spanish for beautiful) is a bay filly with a small white star bred in Ireland by the Beauty is Truth Syndicate, a breeding company associated with the Coolmore Stud. The filly was sent into training with Aidan O'Brien at Ballydoyle. Like many Coolmore horses, the official details of her ownership have changed from race to race but she has usually been described as being owned by a partnership of Michael Tabor, Derrick Smith and Susan Magnier.

She was sired by Galileo, who won the Derby, Irish Derby and King George VI and Queen Elizabeth Stakes in 2001. Galileo is now one of the world's leading stallions and has been a multiple champion sire of Great Britain and Ireland. His other progeny include Cape Blanco, Frankel, Golden Lilac, Nathaniel, New Approach, Rip Van Winkle, Found Minding and Ruler of the World. Hermosa's dam Beauty Is Truth was a high-class sprinter whose wins included the Prix d'Arenberg and the Prix du Gros Chêne and whose other foals have included Hydrangea, The United States (Ranvet Stakes) and Fire Lily (Anglesey Stakes). She was a descendant of the broodmare Irish Lass (foaled 1962), the female-line ancestor of numerous major winners including Bikala, Assert, Eurobird and Last Tycoon.

== Racing career ==
=== 2018: two-year-old season ===
Hermosa began her racing career in a maiden race over seven furlongs at the Curragh on 29 June in which she started at odds of 7/2 and finished fourth of the eleven runners behind her stablemate Peach Tree. In a similar event over the same distance at Galway Racecourse on 31 July she started the 11/8 favourite and recorded her first success as she took the lead inside the final furlong and won by a length from Engles Rock. She was then moved up in class for the Group 2 Debutante Stakes at the Curragh in August and came home sixth of the nine runners, more than six lengths behind the winner Skitter Scatter. In the following month she contested the Group 1 Moyglare Stud Stakes in which he started a 20/1 outsider but exceeded expectations by finishing third behind Skitter Scatter and Lady Kaya.

On 30 September Hermosa was dropped back to Group 3 class for the Weld Park Stakes at Naas Racecourse and started the 5/4 favourite against seven opponents. Ridden by Ryan Moore she led for most of the way, pulled clear of the field in the closing stages and won by two and a half lengths from Foxtrot Liv. After the race Aidan O'Brien said "She's a lovely, laid-back filly and is learning with every run. I think she’ll go for the Fillies' Mile. She crying out to go up to a mile."

In October, as her trainer had predicted, the filly was sent to England and stepped up in distance for the Fillies' Mile at Newmarket Racecourse in which he was made the 5/2 favourite, but despite staying on well in the closing stages she was beaten into second place by Iridessa. On her final run of the season Hermosa was matched against male opponents in the Critérium International at Chantilly Racecourse. She took the lead 400 metres from the finish but was overtaken in the closing stages and beaten three quarters of a length by the colt Royal Meeting.

=== 2019: three-year-old season ===
On her three-year-old debut Hermosa raced at Newmarket for the second time when she was one of four Ballydoyle entries in the fifteen-runner field for the 206th running of the 1000 Guineas on 5 May and started at odds of 14/1. The Nell Gwyn Stakes winner Qabalah started favourite while the other runners included Iridessa, Skitter Scatter, Lady Kaya, Fairyland, Just Wonderful (Rockfel Stakes) and Dandhu (Fred Darling Stakes). Ridden by Wayne Lordan Hermosa took the lead from the start, and despite coming under strong pressure in the last quarter mile she kept on well to win by a length and a neck from Lady Kaya and Qabala. O'Brien commented "Physically, she changed a lot over the winter and really grew into a three-year-old. She's a very, very, very tough filly. She won't mind stepping up in trip. It's that will to win that makes [horses sired by Galileo] so tough, they're never beaten. When anything comes to challenge, they put their heads down and fight to the end."

Three weeks after her victory at Newmarket, Hermosa, with Moore in the saddle, started 5/2 favourite for the Irish 1000 Guineas at the Curragh. Qabala, Just Wonderful, Iridessa and Fairyland where again in opposition, while the best of the other five runners appeared to be Pretty Pollyanna and East (Prix Thomas Bryon). As in her previous start Hermosa immediately went to the front and after maintaining a narrow advantage for most of the way she drew away in the final furlong and won by four lengths from Pretty Pollyanna. After the race Moore said "She was always in control and didn't really look like getting beat at any stage. She is very strong."

At Royal Ascot on 21 June Hermosa started favourite against eight opponents as she attempted to complete a Group 1 hat-trick in the Coronation Stakes. After racing in second place behind Pretty Pollyanna she moved up to take the lead in the straight but was overtaken approaching the final furlong and beaten into second place by the French-trained outsider Watch Me. On 1 August Hermosa started favourite when matched against older fillies and mares in the Nassau Stakes at Goodwood Racecourse but faded badly in the closing stages and finished tailed-off last of the nine runners behind the Japanese challenger Deirdre. She produced a much better effort in the Matron Stakes at Leopardstown Racecourse in September, taking the lead in the last quarter mile before being overtaken in the closing stages and beaten three quarters of a length by Iridessa. At Newmarket in October Hermosa was made joint-favourite for the Sun Chariot Stakes but came home eighth of the nine runners behind Billesdon Brook, beaten just over seven lengths by the winner.

== Pedigree ==
Pedigree of Hermosa (IRE), bay filly, 2016
Sire Galileo (IRE) 1998	Sadler's Wells (USA); 1981	Northern Dancer	Nearctic
Sire Galileo (IRE) 1998	Sadler's Wells (USA); 1981	Northern Dancer	Natalma
Sire Galileo (IRE) 1998	Sadler's Wells (USA); 1981	Fairy Bridge	Bold Reason
Sire Galileo (IRE) 1998	Sadler's Wells (USA); 1981	Fairy Bridge	Special
Sire Galileo (IRE) 1998	Urban Sea (USA) ch. 1989	Miswaki	Mr. Prospector
Sire Galileo (IRE) 1998	Urban Sea (USA) ch. 1989	Miswaki	Hopespringseternal
Sire Galileo (IRE) 1998	Urban Sea (USA) ch. 1989	Allegretta	Lombard
Sire Galileo (IRE) 1998	Urban Sea (USA) ch. 1989	Allegretta	Anatevka
Dam Beauty Is Truth (IRE) 2004	Pivotal (GB); 1993	Polar Falcon	Nureyev
Dam Beauty Is Truth (IRE) 2004	Pivotal (GB); 1993	Polar Falcon	Marie d'Argonne
Dam Beauty Is Truth (IRE) 2004	Pivotal (GB); 1993	Fearless Revival	Cozzene
Dam Beauty Is Truth (IRE) 2004	Pivotal (GB); 1993	Fearless Revival	Stufida
Dam Beauty Is Truth (IRE) 2004	Zelding (IRE); 1995	Warning	Known Fact
Dam Beauty Is Truth (IRE) 2004	Zelding (IRE); 1995	Warning	Slightly Dangerous
Dam Beauty Is Truth (IRE) 2004	Zelding (IRE); 1995	Zelda	Caerleon
Dam Beauty Is Truth (IRE) 2004	Zelding (IRE); 1995	Zelda	Mill Princess (Family 8-c)
