= Ten Sovereigns =

Irish-bred Thoroughbred racehorse

- Racing silks of Mr Derrick Smith
- Sire: No Nay Never
- Grandsire: Scat Daddy
- Dam: Seeking Solace
- Damsire: Exceed and Excel
- Sex: Colt
- Foaled: 28 March 2016
- Country: Ireland
- Colour: Bay
- Breeder: Camas Park, Lynch Bages & Summerhill
- Owner: Michael Tabor, Derrick Smith & Sue Magnier
- Trainer: Aidan O'Brien
- Record: 8: 4-0-0
- Earnings: £749,219

Major wins
- Round Tower Stakes (2018); Middle Park Stakes (2018); July Cup (2019)

Ten Sovereigns (foaled 28 March 2016) is an Irish Thoroughbred racehorse. He was one of the best two-year-olds in Europe in 2018 when he was unbeaten in three races including the Round Tower Stakes and the Middle Park Stakes. He was beaten when favourite for the 2000 Guineas on his reappearance in 2019 but subsequently returned to sprint distances and won the July Cup.

== Background ==
Ten Sovereigns is a bay colt bred in Ireland by Camas Park, Lynch Bages & Summerhill. In October 2017 the yearling was offered for sale at Tattersalls and was bought for 200,000 guineas by the bloodstock agent Charlie Gordon-Watson of behalf of John Magnier's Coolmore Stud organisation. The colt was sent into training with Aidan O'Brien at Ballydoyle. Like many Coolmore horses, the official details of his ownership changed from race to race: he has sometimes been listed as being the property of Susan Magnier, while on other occasions he was described as being owned by a partnership of Derrick Smith, Michael Tabor and Susan Magnier.

He is from the first crop of foals sired by No Nay Never, an American horse who had his greatest success in Europe where he won the Norfolk Stakes and the Prix Morny as a juvenile in 2013. His other foals from his first season at stud included the Richmond Stakes winner Land Force. Ten Sovereigns' name appears to derive from the lyric "I took from my pocket ten sovereigns bright" from the song The Wild Rover: the chorus of the song begins with the words "No, nay, never..." the name of his sire. Ten Sovereigns' dam Seeking Solace showed some racing ability in France, winning one minor race and finishing fourth in the Prix Penelope. She was descended from the CCA Oaks winner Marshua.

== Racing career ==
=== 2018: two-year-old season ===
Ten Sovereigns was ridden in all three of his races by his trainer's son Donnacha O'Brien. On his racecourse debut on 25 August the colt started at odds of 5/1 in a twenty-five runner maiden race over six furlongs at the Curragh. After tracking the leaders he went to the front a furlong out and drew right away in the closing stages to win "easily" by seven lengths from Carbon Fibre. A week later over the same course and distance the colt was stepped up in class to contest the Group 3 Round Tower Stakes and was made the 1/3 favourite against seven opponents headed by the Fillies' Sprint Stakes winner Servalan. He recorded another easy win as he settled in second behind his stablemate Fantasy before taking the lead approaching the final furlong and pulling clear to win by almost four lengths. After the race Aidan O'Brien said "He's definitely fast, but he's relaxed and he's very clean-winded. He seemed to do everything right and he has a good, big, open stride. He has a lovely mind, even into the stalls, and everything is very easy".

On 29 September Ten Sovereigns was sent to England for the Group 1 Middle Park Stakes over six furlongs at Newmarket Racecourse. His six rivals included his stablemate Sergei Prokofiev (Rochestown Stakes), Jash (unbeaten in two starts), Emaraaty Ana (Gimcrack Stakes) and Rumble Inthejungle (Molecomb Stakes). After tracking the leaders he went to the front in the last quarter mile and held off the sustained challenge of Jash to win by half a length, with the pair coming home well clear of the rest. Donnacha O'Brien commented "He learned a lot today and he had to fight today,” his jockey said. “It was a big learning curve and when the other horse came to him, he did fight. He put his head down and battled hard. He’s a fast horse and a natural sprinter".

Aidan O'Brien considered running the colt in the Dewhurst Stakes two weeks later but gave up on the idea, saying "he had three runs in a relatively short space of time and, in fairness to the horse, we've decided to leave him alone until next season".

=== 2019: three-year-old season ===
On his first appearance of 2019 Ten Sovereigns was ridden by Ryan Moore when he started the 9/4 favourite in a nineteen-runner field for the 2000 Guineas at Newmarket. The race appeared to be strongly affected by the draw as the three horses drawn on the stands side dominated the race for most of the way and finished first, second and sixth. Ten Sovereigns raced up the centre of the track and came home fifth, almost five lengths behind his stablemate Magna Grecia, but only a neck behind Skardu, who finished first in the centre group. The colt was then dropped back to sprint distances to contest the Commonwealth Cup at Royal Ascot on 21 June. Ridden by Moore he started favourite again, but despite making steady progress in the closing stages he never looked likely to win and finished fourth behind Advertise. On 13 July at Newmarket Ten Sovereigns was matched against older horses in the July Cup and started at odds of 9/2 in a twelve-runner field. Advertise started favourite, while the other contenders included Pretty Pollyanna, Fairyland, Limato and Cape Byron (Wokingham Stakes). Racing down the centre of the track, Ten Sovereigns disputed the lead from the start and drew away from his opponents in the closing stages to win by two and three quarter lengths. After the race Aidan O'Brien commented "We knew he was very good from last year but we trained him for a Guineas and he hadn’t really clicked into sprinting at Ascot. We knew his last few works before coming here that he was right there again. He's like all those good athletes, he goes a very high pace very easily, and when you ask him, he quickens".

At York Racecourse on 23 August Ten Sovereigns was dropped back to five furlongs and started 13/8 favourite for the Nunthorpe Stakes but after tracking the leaders he faded in the closing stages and finished sixth of the eleven runners behind Battaash. The colt was then sent to Australia to contest The Everest, a valuable sprint race over 1200 metres at Randwick Racecourse on 19 October. He was never in serious contention and finished last.

== Stud record ==
At the end of his racing career, Ten Sovereigns was retired to become a breeding stallion at the Coolmore Stud.

=== Notable progeny ===
c = colt, f = filly, g = gelding

Foaled	Name	Sex	Major Wins
2022	Lush Lips	f	Queen Elizabeth II Challenge Cup Stakes
2022	Zulu Kingdom	c	American Turf Stakes
2023	Balantina	f	Breeders' Cup Juvenile Fillies Turf

== Pedigree ==
Pedigree of Ten Sovereigns (IRE), bay colt, 2016
Sire No Nay Never (USA) 2011	Scat Daddy; 2004	Johannesburg	Hennessy
Sire No Nay Never (USA) 2011	Scat Daddy; 2004	Johannesburg	Myth
Sire No Nay Never (USA) 2011	Scat Daddy; 2004	Love Style	Mr Prospector
Sire No Nay Never (USA) 2011	Scat Daddy; 2004	Love Style	Likeable Style
Sire No Nay Never (USA) 2011	Cat's Eye Witness; 2003	Elusive Quality	Gone West
Sire No Nay Never (USA) 2011	Cat's Eye Witness; 2003	Elusive Quality	Hopespringseternal
Sire No Nay Never (USA) 2011	Cat's Eye Witness; 2003	Comical Cat	Exceller
Sire No Nay Never (USA) 2011	Cat's Eye Witness; 2003	Comical Cat	Six Months Long
Dam Seeking Solace (GB) 2007	Exceed and Excel (AUS); 2000	Danehill (USA)	Danzig
Dam Seeking Solace (GB) 2007	Exceed and Excel (AUS); 2000	Danehill (USA)	Razyana
Dam Seeking Solace (GB) 2007	Exceed and Excel (AUS); 2000	Patrona (USA)	Lomond
Dam Seeking Solace (GB) 2007	Exceed and Excel (AUS); 2000	Patrona (USA)	Gladiolus
Dam Seeking Solace (GB) 2007	Flamelet (USA); 2000	Theatrical (IRE)	Nureyev (USA)
Dam Seeking Solace (GB) 2007	Flamelet (USA); 2000	Theatrical (IRE)	Tree of Knowledge
Dam Seeking Solace (GB) 2007	Flamelet (USA); 2000	Darling Flame	Capote
Dam Seeking Solace (GB) 2007	Flamelet (USA); 2000	Darling Flame	My Darling One (Family 16)
