= Pretty Pollyanna =

British-bred Thoroughbred racehorse

- Racing silks of Mr W J Gredley
- Sire: Oasis Dream
- Grandsire: Green Desert
- Dam: Unex Mona Lisa
- Damsire: Shamardal
- Sex: Filly
- Foaled: 25 February 2016
- Country: United Kingdom
- Colour: Bay
- Breeder: Stetchworth & Middle Park Studs
- Owner: W J and T C O Gredley
- Trainer: Michael Bell
- Record: 11: 3-2-1
- Earnings: £402,129

Major wins
- Duchess of Cambridge Stakes (2018); Prix Morny (2018)

Pretty Pollyanna (foaled 25 February 2016) is a British Thoroughbred racehorse. As a two-year-old in 2018 she was one of the best fillies of her generation in Europe, winning the Duchess of Cambridge Stakes and the Prix Morny.

== Background ==
Pretty Pollyanna is a bay filly with a white blaze and a white sock on her left foreleg bred by her owner Bill Gredley at his Stetchworth Stud near Newmarket, Suffolk. As a yearling the filly was put up for auction at Tattersalls in October 2017, but the bidding stopped short of the reserve price of 50,000 guineas. The filly was sent into training with Michael Bell at Newmarket.

She was sired by Oasis Dream, a sprinter who won the July Cup and the Nunthorpe Stakes in 2003 before becoming a very successful breeding stallion. His other progeny have included Midday, Muhaarar and Power. Pretty Pollyanna's dam Unex Mona Lisa was an unraced daughter of Friendlier who was a half-sister to Gredley's great racemare User Friendly.

== Racing career ==
=== 2018: two-year-old season ===
On her racecourse debut Pretty Pollyanna started a 14/1 outsider in an eight-runner maiden race over six furlongs at Yarmouth Racecourse on 15 June. Ridden by Hayley Turner she tracked the front-running favourite Assembly of Truth before taking the lead in the last quarter mile and despite veering left in the final furlong she won by half a length from Kareena Kapoor. Eight days after her win at Yarmouth the filly was stepped up sharply in class to contest the Group 3 Albany Stakes at Royal Ascot and was ridden for the first time by Silvestre de Sousa. Starting a 28/1 outsider she came home fifth of the eighteen runners behind Main Edition, La Pelosa, Fairyland and Angel's Hideaway. De Sousa was again in the saddle when the filly started at 20/1 for the Group 2 Duchess of Cambridge Stakes at Newmarket Racecourse on 13 July when her eight opponents included La Pelosa, Main Edition and Angel's Hideaway. Pretty Pollyanna took the lead two furlongs out and drew right away to win by seven lengths from Angel's Hideaway despite being eased down in the final strides. After the race Michael Bell said "It was very impressive. There was a little bit of scrimmaging in behind so some might have been closer, but either way it was a good time and she won very easily so you can't be more than very impressed with her. She was impressive at Yarmouth and Ascot last time was a learning curve for her. She has clearly improved a lot from Ascot, but she has only done one piece of easy work. There is a lot to look forward to".

On 19 August Pretty Pollyanna was sent to France and matched against male opposition in the Group 1 Prix Morny over 1200 metres at Deauville Racecourse. Ridden by De Sousa she was made the 1.6/1 favourite against eight opponents including Land Force (winner of the Richmond Stakes), Signora Cabello (Queen Mary Stakes, Prix Robert Papin), Sexy Metro (Prix La Flèche) and Comedy (Prix de Cabourg). Racing down the centre of the wide track Pretty Pollyanna went to the front and half way and held off a sustained challenge from Signora Cabello to win by three quarters of a length, with the pair coming home well clear of the rest. De Sousa commented "She travelled well, like she did last time. Mr Bell said to keep it simple. She's an improving filly and did it the hard way. I think going up to a mile [for the 1000 Guineas] shouldn’t bother her".

In the Group 1 Cheveley Park Stakes at Newmarket on 29 September Pretty Pollyanna started the 6/4 favourite but despite staying on well in the closing stages she never looked likely to win and came home fourth behind Fairyland, The Mackem Bullet and So Perfect, beaten one and three quarter lengths by the winner. Two weeks later at the same track, the filly was stepped up in distance for the Group 1 Fillies' Mile in which she was partnered by Danny Tudhope. She disputed the lead from the start and went to the front approaching the last quarter mile but was overtaken in the final furlong and finished third behind the Irish-trained fillies Iridessa and Hermosa.

=== 2019: three-year-old season ===
On 26 May Pretty Pollyanna made her three-year-old debut at the Curragh in the Irish 1000 Guineas over one mile when she was ridden by Frankie Dettori and started at odds of 9/1 in a ten-runner field. After racing just behind the leaders she kept on well in the closing stages to finish second behind Hermosa. She faced Hermosa again in the Coronation Stakes at Royal Ascot but after leading for most of the way she faded badly in the closing stages and came home seventh of the nine runners. The filly then reverted to sprint distances and was matched against older horses and male opposition in the July Cup at Newmarket in which she finished fourth to Ten Sovereigns, Advertise and Fairyland. At Deauville in August she was beaten less than two and a half lengths when running sixth to Advertise in the Prix Maurice de Gheest. Later that month Pretty Pollyanna was dropped back to Listed class for the Hopeful Stakes at Newmarket and started 10/11 favourite against nine opponents. She took the lead inside the final furlong but was caught near the finish and beaten a head by the six-year-old gelding Raucous.

== Pedigree ==
Pedigree of Pretty Pollyanna (GB), bay filly, 2016
Sire Oasis Dream (GB) 2000	Green Desert (USA); 1983	Danzig	Northern Dancer (CAN)
Sire Oasis Dream (GB) 2000	Green Desert (USA); 1983	Danzig	Pas de Nom
Sire Oasis Dream (GB) 2000	Green Desert (USA); 1983	Foreign Courier	Sir Ivor
Sire Oasis Dream (GB) 2000	Green Desert (USA); 1983	Foreign Courier	Courtly Dee
Sire Oasis Dream (GB) 2000	Hope (IRE); 1991	Dancing Brave (USA)	Lyphard
Sire Oasis Dream (GB) 2000	Hope (IRE); 1991	Dancing Brave (USA)	Navajo Princess
Sire Oasis Dream (GB) 2000	Hope (IRE); 1991	Bahamian	Mill Reef (USA)
Sire Oasis Dream (GB) 2000	Hope (IRE); 1991	Bahamian	Sorbus
Dam Unex Mona Lisa (GB) 2009	Shamardal (USA); 2002	Giant's Causeway	Storm Cat
Dam Unex Mona Lisa (GB) 2009	Shamardal (USA); 2002	Giant's Causeway	Mariah's Storm
Dam Unex Mona Lisa (GB) 2009	Shamardal (USA); 2002	Helsinki (GB)	Machiavellian (USA)
Dam Unex Mona Lisa (GB) 2009	Shamardal (USA); 2002	Helsinki (GB)	Helen Street
Dam Unex Mona Lisa (GB) 2009	Friendlier; 2000	Zafonic (USA)	Gone West
Dam Unex Mona Lisa (GB) 2009	Friendlier; 2000	Zafonic (USA)	Zaizafon
Dam Unex Mona Lisa (GB) 2009	Friendlier; 2000	Rostova	Blakeney
Dam Unex Mona Lisa (GB) 2009	Friendlier; 2000	Rostova	Poppy Day (Family: 1-s)
