= Battaash =

Irish-bred Thoroughbred racehorse

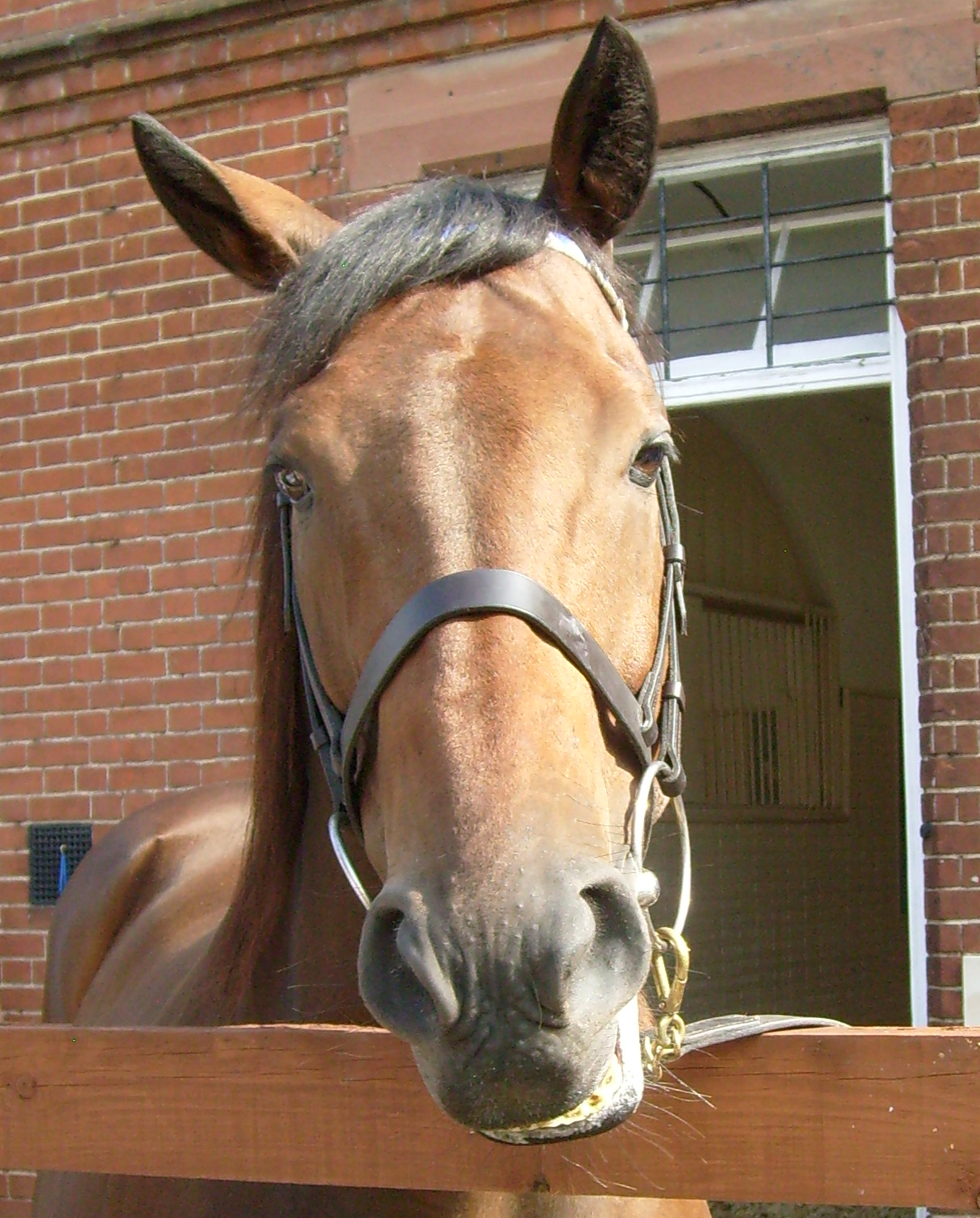
- Battaash in September 2024
- Sire: Dark Angel
- Grandsire: Acclamation
- Dam: Anna Law
- Damsire: Lawman
- Sex: Gelding
- Foaled: 10 February 2014
- Country: Ireland
- Colour: Bay
- Breeder: Ballyphilip Stud
- Owner: Hamdan Al Maktoum
- Trainer: Charles Hills
- Record: 25: 13-2-3
- Earnings: £1,774,180

Major wins
- Scurry Stakes (2017); Coral Charge (2017); King George Stakes (2017, 2018, 2019, 2020); Prix de l'Abbaye (2017); Temple Stakes (2018, 2019); Nunthorpe Stakes (2019, 2020); King's Stand Stakes (2020)

Awards
- Cartier Champion Sprinter (2020)

Battaash (foaled 10 February 2014) is retired Irish-bred, British-trained Thoroughbred racehorse. A specialist sprinter who usually competed at the minimum distance of five furlongs, he was noted for his exceptional speed and unpredictable temperament. He won once from five starts as a juvenile in 2016 and was gelded in an attempt to improve his behaviour. In the following year he emerged as one of the best sprinters in the world, winning the Scurry Stakes, Coral Charge and King George Stakes before ending the season with an emphatic win in the Prix de l'Abbaye. In 2018 he won the Temple Stakes and recorded a second victory in the King George Stakes. As a five-year-old he won a second Temple Stakes and a third King George Stakes before producing his best performance of the season to take the Nunthorpe Stakes. In 2020 he was unbeaten in three starts, namely the King's Stand Stakes, King George Stakes and Nunthorpe Stakes. He was retired after two unsuccessful runs in 2021.

== Background ==
Battaash is a bay gelding bred in Ireland by the County Limerick-based Ballyphilip Stud. In October 2015 the yearling colt was put up for auction at Tattersalls and was bought for 200,000 guineas by Hamdan Al Maktoum's Shadwell Estate Company. Battaash was sent into training with Charles "Charlie" Hills at Lambourn in Berkshire.

His sire Dark Angel won four races including the Mill Reef Stakes and the Middle Park Stakes as a two-year-old in 2007 before being retired to stud at the end of the year. Dark Angel's other offspring have included Harry Angel, Lethal Force, Mecca's Angel and Persuasive. Battaash's dam Anna Law showed no racing ability, finishing at the rear of the field in all four of her races in 2012. Her grand-dam Noirmant was a half-sister to Braashee (Prix Royal-Oak), Ghariba (Nell Gwyn Stakes) and Adam Smith (Fort Marcy Handicap) and, as a female-line descendant of Pelting (foaled 1958) related to several other major winners including Moon Ballad, Bassenthwaite, Telescope and Awzaan.

== Racing career ==
=== 2016: two-year-old season ===
Battaash made his first appearance in a maiden race over five furlongs on good ground at Bath Racecourse on 18 May and started a 14/1 outsider in a nine-runner field. Ridden by the apprentice jockey Michael Murphy he started poorly but took the lead a furlong from the finish and went clear to win "readily" by four lengths. The colt was then stepped up in class for the Listed Windsor Castle Stakes at Royal Ascot in June. He became highly agitated prior to the race and reared up in the starting stalls before finishing unplaced behind Ardad. Shortly after the race he was gelded.

Battaash recovered from his operation and returned to the track on 9 September in a minor race at Doncaster in which he led for most of the way before hanging to the right in the closing stages and finishing third behind Lost At Sea and Dream of Dreams. Two week later, under top weight of 133 pounds, he ran third in nursery handicap at Haydock Park. On his final appearance of the season, the gelding was stepped up to Group 3 class for the Cornwallis Stakes at Newmarket on 7 October. He briefly took the lead approaching the final furlong before being overtaken and beaten into third place by the fillies Mrs Danvers and Clem Fandango: as at Doncaster he compromised his chances by hanging badly to the right.

=== 2017: three-year-old season ===
On his three-year-old debut, Battaash was partnered by Dane O'Neill and started at odds of 11/1 for the Listed Scurry Stakes at Sandown Park on 17 June. He started slowly but went to the front a furlong out and won from Koropick and the favourite Copper Knight despite displaying his old tendency to drift right in the closing stages. O'Neill was again in the saddle when the gelding was matched against older horses in the Group 3 Coral Charge over the same course and distance on 8 July. On this occasion he started 5/2 favourite against nine opponents including Goldream, Muthmir (2015 King George Stakes) Mirza (Prix du Petit Couvert) and Tis Marvellous (Prix Robert Papin). He took the lead soon after the start, opened up a clear advantage, and won in "impressive " style by three and a quarter lengths from Mirza. Battaash was moved up to Group 2 class for the first time when he contested the King George Stakes at Goodwood Racecourse on 4 August in which he was ridden by Jim Crowley. He went off at odds of 9/2 in an eleven-runner field which included Profitable (King's Stand Stakes), Marsha, Priceless (Temple Stakes), Take Cover (winner of the race in 2014 and 2016), Washington, D.C. and Ardad. Battaash tracked the leaders before accelerating into the lead a furlong out and winning by two and a quarter lengths from Profitable. After the race Charles Hill commented "He's a three-year-old who's improving and going through the ranks and this is another step up today. He's up against some proper sprinters there and he just travelled with such ease."

The Nunthorpe Stakes at York Racecourse on 25 August featured a much-anticipated clash between Battaash and the American filly Lady Aurelia. Battaash was among the leaders from the start but was unable to quicken in the closing stages and came home fourth behind Marsha, Lady Aurelia and the outsider Cotai Glory (also trained by Hills). In October the gelding was sent to France to contest the Group 1 Prix de l'Abbaye over 1000 metres at Chantilly Racecourse and started favourite in a thirteen-runner field which also included Marsha, Queen Kindly (Lowther Stakes), Signs of Blessing (Prix Maurice de Gheest), Profitable, Finsbury Square (Prix de Meautry) and Son Cesio (Prix du Gros Chêne). Crowley sent Battaash into the lead soon after the start and the gelding steadily increased his advantage to win "unchallenged" by four lengths from Marsha. Crowley commented "It was an unbelievable performance. He broke well and was absolutely winging; they just couldn't go fast enough for him. I ended up taking it up after a furlong and a half. With Battaash you're just a passenger, it's as simple as that."

In November, Battaash underwent an operation to correct a potential breathing problem caused by a trapped epiglottis.

In the 2017 World's Best Racehorse Rankings, Battaash was given a rating of 123, making him the twelfth-best horse in the world and the second best sprinter, two pounds behind Harry Angel.

=== 2018: four-year-old season ===
Battaash began in his third season in the Temple Stakes at Haydock on 26 May, in which he was ridden by O'Neill. Despite carrying a five-pound weight penalty, he started the odds-on favourite and produced a strong late run to win by a head from Washington, D.C. The other beaten horses included Muthmir, Take Cover, Mabs Cross (Palace House Stakes) and Kachy (Molecomb Stakes).

The Group 1 King's Stand Stakes at Royal Ascot in June saw Battaash start the 9/4 second favourite behind Lady Aurelia in a fourteen-runner field. After becoming agitated before the start, the gelding led for most of the way but was overtaken inside the final furlong and beaten into second place by the Godolphin representative Blue Point. On 3 August Battaash started the 8/11 when he attempted to repeat his 2017 success in the King George Stakes at Goodwood. Take Cover, Muthmir and Kachy were again in opposition while his other seven opponents included the three-year-olds Sioux Nation (Phoenix Stakes) and Havana Grey (Sapphire Stakes). After tracking the leaders, Battaash took the lead two furlongs from the finish and accelerated away from his opponents to win impressively by four lengths from Take Cover. Hills said "He is an exceptional horse, and I think that could well be a career-best. It was also the best he has behaved in the preliminaries. He has had plenty more racing now and I think he is learning with every run", while Crowley commented "When those gates open, you light the fuse".

Three weeks after his win at Goodwood Battaash made his second attempt to win the Nunthorpe Stakes and started 4/5 favourite in a fifteen-runner field. Once again however, he failed to show his best form in the race, briefly taking the lead but fading in the final furlong and coming home fourth behind the 40/1 outsider Alpha Delphini. Jim Crowley said "I don't know what to make of it. He didn't get upset in any way... He just didn't have any kick... I don't know why, I'm gutted". When Battaash attempted to repeat his 2017 success in the Prix de l'Abbaye he started favourite but after leading for most of the way he was overtaken in the last 200 metres and came home fourth behind the filly Mabs Cross.

In the 2018 World's Best Racehorse Rankings Battaash repeated his 2017 rating of 123, making him the fourteenth best horse in the world and the second best sprinter, level with the Australian Trapeze Artist and one pound behind the American dirt performer Roy H. was placed eighth, with a rating of 125.

=== 2019: five-year-old season ===
On his debut as a five-year-old Battaash attempted to repeat his 2018 success in the Temple Stakes and started 4/5 favourite against five opponents including Mabs Cross, Alpha Delphini and Kachy. With Crowley in the saddle he took the lead two furlongs out and drew clear to win in "impressive" style by two and a half lengths. In June the gelding made his second attempt to win the King's Stand Stakes at Royal Ascot and started the 2/1 favourite in a twelve-runner field. He raced on the stands side before switching to the centre of the track but despite making good progress in the closing stages he was unable to get on terms with Blue Point and was beaten into second place. On 2 August Battaash started the 1/4 favourite as he attempted to become the first horse to win three runnings of the King George Stakes with the best fancied of his eight opponents being the French-trained pair El Astronaute and Big Brothers Pride (Prix Sigy). He raced in second place before taking the lead two furlongs out and was "always in command" thereafter, winning by three quarters of a length from Houtzen. Crowley commented "He's all speed. He's the fastest five furlong horse around and he doesn't really get much further. If there were four and a half furlong races around he'd be unbelievable".

Three weeks after his win in the King George, Battaash made his third attempt to win the Nunthorpe Stakes and started the 7/4 second favourite behind the three-year-old Ten Sovereigns. The other nine runners included Mabs Cross, Fairyland and Soldier's Call (Flying Childers Stakes). Battaash raced close behind the leaders before going to the front two furlongs out and drew away to win by three and a quarter lengths from Soldier's Call. His winning time of 55.90 broke the record for the race at York, which had stood since Hamdan Al Maktoum's Dayjur won in 56.16 twenty-nine years earlier. Charlie Hills said "he'd finished fourth on both starts here before but he's a lot more experienced now and now I think he's one of the fastest horses there's ever been... he was on the wing and got a great lead.. To lower Dayjur's record is pretty amazing... I thought there would never be another one faster than him. But there is now, and Willie Carson always said to me that he looks like he could be the next Dayjur".

In October Battaash started odds-on favourite for the Prix de l'Abbaye on very soft ground at Longchamp but ran very poorly to finish fourteenth of the sixteen runners behind Glass Slippers. Plans to send him to the United States for the Breeders' Cup Turf Sprint were abandoned. Hills said "He's come out of it really fresh. We gave him a good look over and couldn't find anything wrong with him, so I just think it had to be the ground."

In the 2019 World's Best Racehorse Rankings Battaash was given a rating of 126, making him the 5th best racehorse in the world and the highest rated sprinter.

=== 2020: six-year-old season ===
The 2020 flat racing season in England and Ireland was disrupted by the COVID-19 pandemic and Battaash did not make his reappearance until 16 June when he contested his third King's Stand Stakes and started the 5/6 favourite against ten opponents including Liberty Beach (Molecomb Stakes), Glass Slippers, Equilateral (Scarbrough Stakes), Tis Marvellous and Sergei Prokofiev (Cornwallis Stakes). Battaash led from the start and never looked in any danger of defeat, drawing away in the closing stages to win by two and a quarter lengths from Equilateral. Jim Crowley commented "I had to hold him for two furlongs as he was on a bit of a going day today and wanting to charge off - my only concern was trying to get the fractions right on him as there was nothing quick enough to lead him. When the gates opened today, he was gone. Every time he wins it feels special, as when he wins he wins well. I was a bit worried the stiff uphill finish might find him out on his first run, but he's just a real superstar."

Only six horses appeared to oppose Battaash when he went off at odds of 2/7 in his attempt at a record fourth consecutive win in the King George Stakes at Goodwood on 31 July. He overtook the front-running outsider Ken Colt three furlongs out and kept on well to win by two and a quarter lengths from Glass Slippers. Hills commented "The conditions were great for him today and they obviously went a very fast pace. The key to him is to not take him back really - his main advantage is he seems to get horses out of their comfort zone in the middle part of the race. He's a six-year-old now and knows more about racing than most of us at this stage. He's got very professional... It's a credit to the horse to still have the enthusiasm he has - he's a true athlete."

Three weeks after his win at Goodwood Battaash started 1/2 favourite for the Nunthorpe Stakes at York with the best fancied of his six opponents being the three-year-olds Art Power (Lacken Stakes) and A'Ali (Prix Robert Papin). After racing in second place he got the better of a sustained struggle with the four-year-old filly Que Amoro over the last quarter mile to win by a length. After the race Hills said "The second showed amazing speed, and with the tailwind it can be hard to reel them in, so I knew it was going to be tough. I'm so proud of him today, I probably think it was the best run of his career as conditions were against him. He had to knuckle down and work really hard." The gelding was expected to end his season in the Prix de l'Abbaye but was scratched from the race on account of the very soft ground. Hills explained "It's a real shame but the ground looks like it will be the same or worse than last year and it would be silly to take a risk with a horse like him."

On 19 November Battaash was named Champion Sprinter at the Cartier Racing Awards. In the 2020 World's Best Racehorse Rankings, Battaash was rated on 123, making him the equal 15th best racehorse in the world and the best sprinter in Europe.

=== 2021: seven-year-old season and retirement ===
At the beginning of the season Battaash's groom, Bob Grace, who had helped turn the gelding's behaviour around, retired from racing. Battaash's first race of the season was the King's Stand Stakes at Royal Ascot, where he started 11/8 favourite and came fourth behind Oxted. He again started favourite for the King George Stakes at Goodwood on 30 July, only to come seventh of thirteen runners. The following day his retirement from racing was announced. After his retirement, he went out to grass with stablemate and Group 2 winner Akmal at one of the Shadwell farms and made occasional public appearances.

== Pedigree ==
Pedigree of Battaash (IRE), bay gelding, 2014
Sire Dark Angel (IRE) 2005	Acclamation (GB); 1999	Royal Applause	Waajib (IRE)
Sire Dark Angel (IRE) 2005	Acclamation (GB); 1999	Royal Applause	Flying Melody (IRE)
Sire Dark Angel (IRE) 2005	Acclamation (GB); 1999	Princess Athena (IRE)	Ahonoora (GB)
Sire Dark Angel (IRE) 2005	Acclamation (GB); 1999	Princess Athena (IRE)	Shopping Wise
Sire Dark Angel (IRE) 2005	Midnight Angel (GB); 1994	Machiavellian (USA)	Mr. Prospector
Sire Dark Angel (IRE) 2005	Midnight Angel (GB); 1994	Machiavellian (USA)	Coup de Folie
Sire Dark Angel (IRE) 2005	Midnight Angel (GB); 1994	Night at Sea	Night Shift(USA)
Sire Dark Angel (IRE) 2005	Midnight Angel (GB); 1994	Night at Sea	Into Harbour
Dam Anna Law (IRE) 2010	Lawman (FR); 2004	Invincible Spirit (IRE)	Green Desert (USA)
Dam Anna Law (IRE) 2010	Lawman (FR); 2004	Invincible Spirit (IRE)	Rafha (GB)
Dam Anna Law (IRE) 2010	Lawman (FR); 2004	Laramie (USA)	Gulch
Dam Anna Law (IRE) 2010	Lawman (FR); 2004	Laramie (USA)	Light The Lights (FR)
Dam Anna Law (IRE) 2010	Portelet (GB); 1992	Night Shift (USA)	Northern Dancer (CAN)
Dam Anna Law (IRE) 2010	Portelet (GB); 1992	Night Shift (USA)	Ciboulette (CAN)
Dam Anna Law (IRE) 2010	Portelet (GB); 1992	Noirmant	Dominion
Dam Anna Law (IRE) 2010	Portelet (GB); 1992	Noirmant	Krakow (Family:4-k)

- Battaash was inbred 3 × 4 to Night Shift, meaning that this stallion appears in both the third and fourth generations of his pedigree.
