= Iridessa =

Irish-bred Thoroughbred racehorse

- Racing silks of Mrs A-M O'Brien and Mrs C C Regalado-Gonzalez
- Sire: Ruler of the World
- Grandsire: Galileo
- Dam: Senta's Dream
- Damsire: Danehill
- Sex: Filly
- Foaled: 14 January 2016
- Country: Ireland
- Colour: Bay
- Breeder: Whisperview Trading Ltd
- Owner: Anne-Marie O'Brien; Chantal Regalado-Gonzalez
- Trainer: Joseph Patrick O'Brien
- Record: 12: 5-0-3
- Earnings: £1,560,887

Major wins
- Fillies' Mile (2018); Pretty Polly Stakes (2019); Matron Stakes (2019); Breeders' Cup Filly & Mare Turf (2019)

Iridessa (foaled 14 January 2016) is an Irish Thoroughbred racehorse. As a two-year-old in 2018 she was one of the best fillies of her generation in Europe, winning the Group 1 Fillies' Mile. In the following year she was beaten in her first three races but then recorded further major wins in the Pretty Polly Stakes, Matron Stakes, and Breeders' Cup Filly & Mare Turf.

== Background ==
Iridessa is a bay filly bred in Ireland by Whisperview Trading Ltd, a breeding company partly owned by Aidan O'Brien. The filly entered the ownership of O'Brien's wife Anne-Marie and was sent into training with his son Joseph Patrick O'Brien.

She was from the first crop of foals sired by the Epsom Derby winner Ruler of the World. Iridessa's dam Senta's Dream was an unraced daughter of the top class racemare Starine. As a broodmare, Senta's Dream also produced Order of Australia and Santa Barbara.

== Racing career ==
=== 2018: two-year-old season ===
On her racecourse debut, Iridessa was ridden by Seamie Heffernan in a minor race over one mile at Killarney Racecourse on 17 July. Starting a 20/1 outsider in a six-runner field she raced in second place behind the favourite Cardini before taking the lead a furlong out and drawing away to win easily by four lengths. Before her next race the filly entered the ownership of Chantal Regalado-Gonzalez. On 26 August Iridessa was moved up in class to contest the Group 2 Debutante Stakes over seven furlongs at the Curragh in which she was ridden by Donnacha O'Brien and finished fifth of the nine runners behind Skitter Scatter. In the Listed Ingabelle Stakes over the same distance at Leopardstown Racecourse on 15 September she finished third behind Sparkle'n'joy and Foxtrot Liv.

On 12 October Iridessa was sent to England for the Group 1 Fillies' Mile at Newmarket Racecourse. Ridden by Wayne Lordan she started a 14/1 outsider in an eight-runner field which included Pretty Pollyanna, Hermosa, Antonia de Vega (Prestige Stakes) and Beyond Reason (Prix du Calvados). Iridessa raced in mid-division before making a forward move in the last quarter mile but was obstructed when attempting to obtain a clear run. She accelerated through a gap to take the lead in the final furlong and won by one and a half lengths from Hermosa with Pretty Pollyanna three quarters of a length back in third. After the race Joseph O'Brien said "We've always loved her. She ran well in a messy race at the Curragh and then was drawn on the inside at Leopardstown so she was set an almost impossible task. Today was probably the first time since her debut that she had a fair crack at everything. She travelled very well through the race. Wayne gave her a fantastic ride".

=== 2019: three-year-old season ===
Iridessa began her second season in the Leopardstown 1,000 Guineas Trial Stakes on 6 April and finished third of the fourteen runners behind Lady Kaya and Happen. On 5 May the filly started 6/1 for the 1000 Guineas over the Rowley Mile at Newmarket, but after tracking the leaders she was outpaced in the final furlong and came home eighth to Hermosa, three lengths behind the winner. In the Irish 1000 Guineas at the Curragh on 26 May she again proved no match for Hermosa and was beaten more than six lengths into fourth place. For her next race, Iridessa was stepped up in distance and matched against older fillies and mares in the Group 1 Pretty Polly Stakes over ten furlongs at the Curragh in which she was ridden by Wayne Lordan. The Epsom Oaks runner-up Pink Dogwood started favourite ahead of Wild Illusion, Magic Wand (Ribblesdale Stakes) and Worth Waiting (Dahlia Stakes) with Iridessa being made the 8/1 outsider in the five-runner field. She raced just behind the leaders Magic Wand and Wild Illusion before taking the lead inside the final furlong and pulling away to win by two and a quarter lengths. After the race O'Brien said "She won very well and it was a huge performance... It was very strong race. There wasn't a big field, but there were some very very good fillies in the race... the step up in distance was a big help to her as well... she's strong and hardy. That's obviously a career-best again today and she's progressed with each run so far this year."

In July Iridessa was again moved up in distance for the Irish Oaks over one and a half miles at the Curragh. She went off the 4/1 third favourite but was never in serious contention and finished seventh of the eight runners, almost twelve lengths behind the winner Star Catcher. At Leopardstown on 14 September the filly was dropped back to one mile for the Matron Stakes in which she was partnered by Lordan and started at odds of 10/1. Laurens went off favourite in a seven-runner field which also included Hermosa, I Can Fly (second in the Queen Elizabeth II Stakes), Just Wonderful (Rockfel Stakes), Skitter Scatter and Happen. Laurens set the pace from Hermosa with Iridessa settled in fourth place before making a forward move in the last quarter mile. She took the lead 150 yards from the finish and kept on well to win by three quarters of a length from Hermosa. O'Brien commented "She's a very good mare when things fall right for her. Wayne gave her a great ride, and she was the best filly on the day. She has a huge engine... She's by a Derby winner but physically looks like more of a miler than a staying filly, but she seems really versatile distance-wise".

At Newmarket on 5 October Iridessa was made third choice in the betting behind Hermosa and Lauren in the Group 1 Sun Chariot Stakes over the Rowley mile. With Donnacha O'Brien in saddle she stayed on well in the closing stages to take third place, beaten one and a half lengths and half a length by Billesdon Brook and Veracious. For her final run of the season the filly was sent to California to contest the Breeders' Cup Filly & Mare Turf over ten furlongs at Santa Anita Park on 2 November. With Lordan in the saddle she went off the 8/1 third favourite behind Sistercharlie and Vasilika (Gamely Stakes) while the other seven runners included Billesdon Brook, Villa Marina, Castle Lady and Mirth (Rodeo Drive Stakes). After racing in third place behind Mirth and Vasilika she went to the front in the straight and kept on well to win by a neck from Vasilika with a gap of two and a quarter lengths back to Sistercharlie in third place. Aidan O'Brien commented "I was very happy through the race. We just wanted to get a nice position early and she had the early place to do that. It was always the plan to finish her season here and we were fortunate to have a good draw and things worked out lovely under a great ride by Wayne. She’s been a great servant to her owner, competing in all the best races and either winning or placing, and I’d love to think she will stay in training next year, when we will run in all the top mile and mile-and-a-quarter races".

In February 2020 it was announced that Iridessa had been retired from racing after sustaining a tendon injury in her stable. She was sold and exported to Japan to become a broodmare.

== Pedigree ==
Pedigree of Iridessa (IRE), bay filly, 2016
Sire Ruler of the World (IRE) 2010	Galileo (IRE); 1998	Sadler's Wells (USA)	Northern Dancer (CAN)
Sire Ruler of the World (IRE) 2010	Galileo (IRE); 1998	Sadler's Wells (USA)	Fairy Bridge
Sire Ruler of the World (IRE) 2010	Galileo (IRE); 1998	Urban Sea (USA)	Miswaki
Sire Ruler of the World (IRE) 2010	Galileo (IRE); 1998	Urban Sea (USA)	Allegretta (GB)
Sire Ruler of the World (IRE) 2010	Love Me True (USA); 1998	Kingmambo	Mr Prospector
Sire Ruler of the World (IRE) 2010	Love Me True (USA); 1998	Kingmambo	Miesque
Sire Ruler of the World (IRE) 2010	Love Me True (USA); 1998	Lassie's Lady	Alydar
Sire Ruler of the World (IRE) 2010	Love Me True (USA); 1998	Lassie's Lady	Lassie Dear
Dam Senta's Dream (GB) 2004	Danehill (USA); 1986	Danzig	Northern Dancer (CAN)
Dam Senta's Dream (GB) 2004	Danehill (USA); 1986	Danzig	Pas de Nom
Dam Senta's Dream (GB) 2004	Danehill (USA); 1986	Razyana	His Majesty
Dam Senta's Dream (GB) 2004	Danehill (USA); 1986	Razyana	Spring Adieu (CAN)
Dam Senta's Dream (GB) 2004	Starine (FR); 1997	Mendocino (USA)	Theatrical (IRE)
Dam Senta's Dream (GB) 2004	Starine (FR); 1997	Mendocino (USA)	Brorita
Dam Senta's Dream (GB) 2004	Starine (FR); 1997	Grisonnante	Kaldoun
Dam Senta's Dream (GB) 2004	Starine (FR); 1997	Grisonnante	Lady Cherie (Family 4-i)

- Iridessa was inbred 4 × 4 to Northern Dancer, meaning that this stallion appears twice in the fourth generation of his pedigree.
