= Blue Point (horse) =

Irish-bred Thoroughbred racehorse

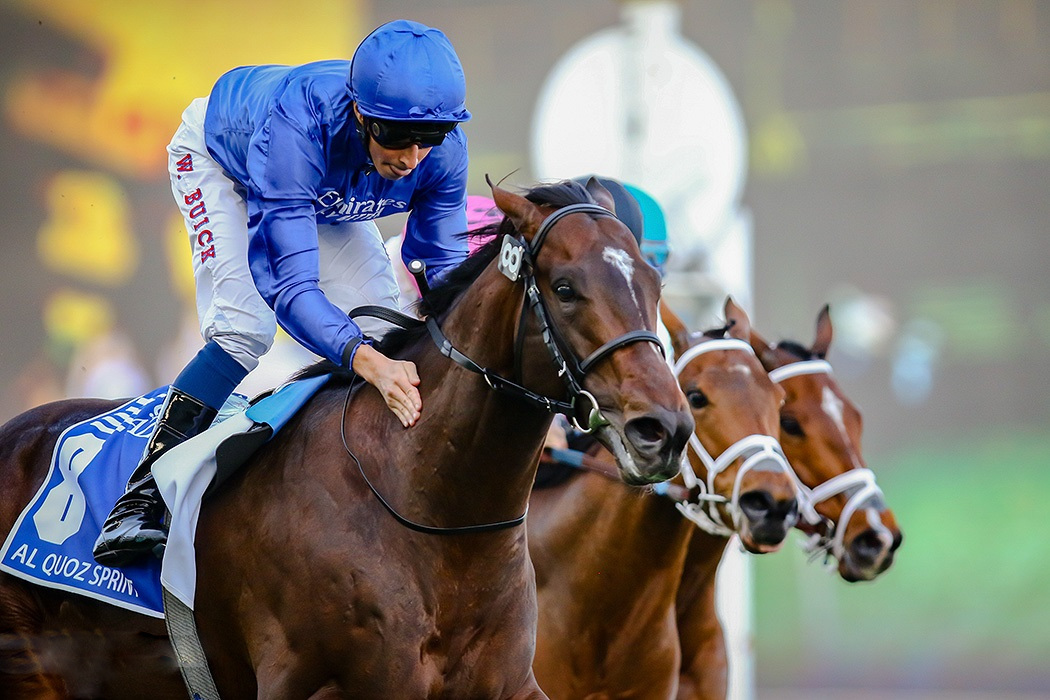
- Blue Point winning the Al Quoz Sprint in 2019
- Sire: Shamardal
- Dam: Scarlett Rose
- Sex: Stallion
- Foaled: 16 March 2014
- Country: Ireland
- Colour: Bay
- Breeder: Oak Lodge Bloodstock
- Owner: Godolphin
- Trainer: Charlie Appleby
- Record: 20: 11-3-3
- Earnings: £2,631,333

Major wins
- Gimcrack Stakes (2016); Pavilion Stakes (2017); Bengough Stakes (2017); King's Stand Stakes (2018, 2019); Meydan Sprint (2019); Nad Al Sheba Turf Sprint (2019); Al Quoz Sprint (2019); Diamond Jubilee Stakes (2019)

Awards
- Cartier Champion Sprinter (2019)

Blue Point, (foaled 16 March 2014) is an Irish-bred, British-trained Thoroughbred racehorse. He was one of the best British-trained two-year-olds of 2016 when he won the Gimcrack Stakes and was placed in the Richmond Stakes, Middle Park Stakes and Dewhurst Stakes. In the following year he developed into a high class sprint horse, taking the Pavilion Stakes and Bengough Stakes as well as running third in the Commonwealth Cup. As a four-year-old in 2018 he recorded his first Group 1 success in the King's Stand Stakes. In 2019 he won three races in Dubai including the Al Quoz Sprint before recording a double at Royal Ascot, taking the King's Stand Stakes for the second time and winning the Diamond Jubilee Stakes.

== Background ==
Blue Point is a bay horse with a white star and a white sock on his left hind leg bred in Ireland by Oak Lodge Bloodstock. As a foal in November 2014 he was put up for auction at Tattersalls where he was sold for 110,000 guineas to Ebor Bloodstock. In October 2015 the yearling returned to the Tattersalls sales ring and was bought for 200,000 guineas by John Ferguson Bloodstock, acting on behalf of Godolphin. The colt was sent into training with Charlie Appleby at Godolphin's British base in Newmarket, Suffolk. He was ridden in most of his races by William Buick.

He was from the eighth crop of foals sired by Shamardal whose wins included the Dewhurst Stakes, Poule d'Essai des Poulains, Prix du Jockey Club and St James's Palace Stakes. His other offspring have included Able Friend, Mukhadram, Lope de Vega and Casamento. Blue Point's dam Scarlett Rose demonstrated little racing ability, failing to win in thirteen starts, but did better as a broodmare, producing the Railway Stakes winner Formosina. She was a half-sister to the Horris Hill Stakes winner Tumbleweed Ridge and, as a descendant of the broodmare Grand Peace, was distantly related to the Ascot Gold Cup winner Sagaro and the Lockinge Stakes winner Sovereign Path.

== Racing career ==
=== 2016: two-year-old season ===
Blue Point began in his racing career in a minor race over six furlongs at Nottingham Racecourse on 9 June and started the 6/4 second favourite in a six-runner field. He took the lead a furlong out and despite hanging left in the closing stages he won "readily" by half a length from the favoured Tafaakhor. On 14 July, with James McDonald in the saddle, the colt started odds-on favourite for a similar event at Doncaster Racecourse and won impressively, coming home eleven lengths clear of his five opponents. Two weeks later the colt was stepped up in class and started 5/6 favourite for the Group 2 Richmond Stakes at Goodwood Racecourse. Ridden by James Doyle he led for most of the way but after hanging to the right in the closing stages he was beaten by a neck by the July Stakes winner Mehmas. On 20 August at York Racecourse, Blue Point contested the Group 2 Gimcrack Stakes and was made the 11/4 favourite ahead of nine opponents including The Last Lion, Mokarris (Rose Bowl Stakes) and Ardad (Windsor Castle Stakes). He raced just behind the leaders before going to the front in the last quarter mile and accelerated away from his rivals in the closing stages to win by three lengths.

On 24 September Blue Point stepped up to Group 1 class for the Middle Park Stakes over six furlongs at Newmarket Racecourse and started the 11/10 favourite against nine opponents. He was always in contention but although he made progress in the last quarter mile he was never able to catch the front-running The Last Lion and was beaten three quarters of a length into second place. At the same track two weeks later, the colt was moved up to seven furlongs for the Dewhurst Stakes and finished third behind Churchill and Lancaster Bomber, with Thunder Snow and Rivet in fourth and fifth.

In the official European Classification of two-year-olds for 2016 Blue Point was given a rating of 116, making him the fifth best juvenile colt of the season, six pounds behind the top-rated Churchill.

=== 2017: three-year-old season ===
Blue Point began his second campaign in the Pavilion Stakes over six furlongs at Ascot Racecourse on 3 May and started the 13/8 favourite in a ten-runner field which included Harry Angel, Mokarris, Yalta (Molecomb Stakes) and Sir Dancealot (Rockingham Stakes). After racing in third place he took the lead approaching the final furlong and kept on well to win by one and a half lengths from Harry Angel in a track record time of 1:11.05. Charlie Appleby said "I'm not going to start changing my opinion of him – he's the quickest horse in the yard and always has been. The horse has wintered well. A couple of people have said he's not the biggest, but for me he's got a great chest on him and plenty of strength". In the Commonwealth Cup over the same course and distance on 23 June he was always in contention before challenging for the lead in the last quarter mile and finishing third, beaten three quarters of a length and half a length by Caravaggio and Harry Angel.

After a break of two and a half month the colt returned on 9 September in the 32Red Sprint Cup on heavy ground at Haydock Park. Ridden by James Doyle, he raced in second place for most of the way but was outpaced in the closing stages and came home fourth behind Harry Angel, Tasleet and The Tin Man. For his final start of the season, Blue Point was dropped back in class for the Group 3 Bengough Stakes at Ascot in October and went off the even money favourite. He led from the start and opened up a three length advantage approaching the final furlong but then came under pressure before holding on to win by half a length from the four-year-old gelding Projection. William Buick, who was returning to the saddle after a serious back injury, said "It's fantastic and I have to thank a lot of people. First of all, Sheikh Mohammed who has been very supportive all along and this horse is not a bad ride to come back on, so my thanks to Charlie and all the team at home".

In the 2017 World's Best Racehorse Rankings, Blue Point was rated the 183rd-best horse in the world with a rating of 116.

=== 2018: four-year-old season ===
In the winter of 2017–2018 Blue Point was sent to be trained at Godolphin's base in Dubai. On his seasonal debut he contested the Group 2 Meydan Sprint over 1000 metres at Meydan Racecourse in February and finished strongly to take second place, beaten a head by the seven-year-old Ertijaal. He was then sent to Hong Kong for the Chairman's Sprint Prize at Sha Tin Racecourse in April but made little impact and came home last of the nine runner field behind Ivictory.

On his first appearance of the year in Europe Blue Point was one of fourteen sprinters to contest the Group 1 King's Stand take over five furlongs at Royal Ascot on 19 June and went off the 6/1 third choice in the betting behind Lady Aurelia and Battaash. The other contenders included Mabs Cross, Kachy (Molecomb Stakes), Washington DC (Windsor Castle Stakes), Different League (Albany Stakes), Finsbury Square (Prix du Gros Chêne) and Gifted Master (Pavilion Stakes). After tracking the leaders Blue Point moved up alongside the front-running Battaash a furlong out before gaining the advantage in the closing stages and drawing ahead to win by one and three quarter lengths. After the race William Buick said "I'm very, very pleased for the horse; he deserves it. He's a very quick horse, I was always very comfortable where I was and I always knew he would see the race out better than Battaash and it was just a case of whether I would be close enough."

In the July Cup over six furlongs at Newmarket Blue Point started the 5/2 favourite but never looked likely to win and came home seventh of the thirteen runners, beaten four and three quarter lengths behind the winner U S Navy Flag. The colt was brought back in distance for the Nunthorpe Stakes over five furlongs at York in August and produced a much better performance to finish third behind Alpha Delphini and Mabs Cross.

In the 2018 World's Best Racehorse Rankings Blue Point was given a rating of 122, making him the 42nd best horse in the world and the third-best sprinter in Europe.

=== 2019: five-year-old season ===
==== Dubai campaign ====
As in the previous year, Blue Point began his season at Meydan Racecourse in Dubai. In the Meydan Sprint on 14 February he started the 1/4 favourite and won "easily" by five lengths from Australian gelding Faatinah. Three weeks later Blue Point contested the Nad Al Sheba Turf Sprint and was made the odds-on favourite against ten opponents. He took the lead 400 metres from the finish and drew away to record another easy win, coming home three lengths clear of Ekhtiyaar.

On 30 March Blue Point contested the Group 1 Al Quoz Sprint and was made the 4/6 favourite ahead of twelve opponents including Brave Smash (Manikato Stakes), Sands of Mali, Stormy Liberal, Ekhtiyaar and The Right Man (winner of the race in 2017). After racing in second place behind the American-trained mare Belvoir Bay he took the lead 100 metres from the finish and won "comfortably" by one and a quarter lengths. Buick commented "The horse has so much confidence. It makes me very confident; we were in great shape throughout. That was nice and straightforward, and the horse deserved it... He travelled really strongly and has again shown a great turn of foot. When he gets to the front he knows he has done enough. It is great at the age of five he is showing everyone just how good he is".

==== Royal Ascot ====
On 18 June at Royal Ascot, Blue Point was ridden by Doyle as he attempted to repeat his 2018 success in the King's Stand Stakes and started the 5/2 second favourite behind his old rival Battaash. The other ten runners included Mabs Cross, Imprimis (Shakertown Stakes), Fairyland, Sergei Prokofiev (Cornwallis Stakes), Soldier's Call (Flying Childers Stakes), Houtzen (P J Bell Stakes) and Signora Cabello (Prix Robert Papin). In a race run in heavy rain Blue Point was always among the leaders, went to the front two furlongs out and kept on "gamely" to win by one and a quarter lengths from Battaash, with Soldier's Call taking third place ahead of Mabs Cross. After the race Appleby said "To do back-to-back wins in this race is fantastic, as I knew he's going to have a great career at stud when he retires at the end of the season. During the winter we saw how much more professional he was. He's strengthened and when William got off him after his first start in Dubai he said he was a different animal. He's the finished article now."

Four days later Blue Point attempted to become the first horse since Choisir to win Royal Ascot's two big weight-for-age sprint races when he started favourite for the Diamond Jubilee Stakes over six furlongs. His seventeen opponents included Bound For Nowhere (Shakertown Stakes) from the United States, City Light (Prix de Saint-Georges) from France, Invincible Army (Duke of York Stakes), Sands of Mali, The Tin Man and the Singapore challenger Lim's Cruiser. He raced just behind the leaders before taking the lead a furlong out and held off a late challenge from Dream of Dreams to win by a head. Appleby commented "we've always known it's when he comes to Ascot that he really brings his 'A' game. I got a bit too excited too soon today. The way he traveled and picked up, I thought he'd put it to bed. Through the last 50 yards, I was holding my breath".

Two days after his win in the Diamond Jubilee it was announced that Blue Point had been retired from racing. Appleby said "To do what he did within five days was the pinnacle of his career and he couldn't have done any more. He retires fit and well to Dalham Hall... we don't think he has anything else to prove".

In November Blue Point was named Champion Sprinter at the Cartier Awards for 2018. In the 2019 World's Best Racehorse Rankings Blue Point was given a rating of 124, making him the 12th best racehorse in the world.

== Stud career ==
In 2020 Blue Point commenced shuttle stallion duties in Victoria, Australia at Darley Northwood Park for a service fee of A$44,000.

=== Notable progeny ===
c = colt, f = filly, g = gelding

Foaled	Name	Sex	Major wins
2021	Rosallion	c	Prix Jean-Luc Lagardère, Irish 2,000 Guineas, St James's Palace Stakes
2021	Big Evs	c	Breeders' Cup Juvenile Turf Sprint
2021	Kind Of Blue	c	British Champions Sprint Stakes
2022	Blue Bolt	f	Falmouth Stakes, Prix Rothschild, Matron Stakes, Sun Chariot Stakes
2023	Samangan	c	Prix Maurice de Gheest
2024	Folsom Blues	c	Vincent O'Brien National Stakes

== Pedigree ==
Pedigree of Blue Point (IRE), bay stallion, 2014
Sire Shamardal (USA) 2002	Giant's Causeway; 1997	Storm Cat	Storm Bird (CAN)
Sire Shamardal (USA) 2002	Giant's Causeway; 1997	Storm Cat	Terlingua
Sire Shamardal (USA) 2002	Giant's Causeway; 1997	Mariah's Storm	Rahy
Sire Shamardal (USA) 2002	Giant's Causeway; 1997	Mariah's Storm	Immense
Sire Shamardal (USA) 2002	Helsinki (GB); 1993	Machiavellian (USA)	Mr. Prospector
Sire Shamardal (USA) 2002	Helsinki (GB); 1993	Machiavellian (USA)	Coup de Folie
Sire Shamardal (USA) 2002	Helsinki (GB); 1993	Helen Street	Troy
Sire Shamardal (USA) 2002	Helsinki (GB); 1993	Helen Street	Waterway (FR)
Dam Scarlett Rose (GB) 2001	Royal Applause; 1993	Waajib (IRE)	Try My Best (USA)
Dam Scarlett Rose (GB) 2001	Royal Applause; 1993	Waajib (IRE)	Coryana
Dam Scarlett Rose (GB) 2001	Royal Applause; 1993	Flying Melody (IRE)	Auction Ring (USA)
Dam Scarlett Rose (GB) 2001	Royal Applause; 1993	Flying Melody (IRE)	Whispering Star (GB)
Dam Scarlett Rose (GB) 2001	Billie Blue; 1986	Ballad Rock (IRE)	Bold Lad (IRE)
Dam Scarlett Rose (GB) 2001	Billie Blue; 1986	Ballad Rock (IRE)	True Rocket
Dam Scarlett Rose (GB) 2001	Billie Blue; 1986	Blue Nose (IRE)	Windjammer (USA)
Dam Scarlett Rose (GB) 2001	Billie Blue; 1986	Blue Nose (IRE)	Hill Slipper (GB) (Family 4-l)
