= Advertise (horse) =

British-bred Thoroughbred racehorse

- Racing silks of Manton Estate Racing and Phoenix Thoroughbred Limited
- Sire: Showcasing
- Grandsire: Oasis Dream
- Dam: Furbelow
- Damsire: Pivotal
- Sex: Colt
- Foaled: 23 February 2016
- Country: United Kingdom
- Colour: Bay
- Breeder: Cheveley Park Stud
- Owner: Manton Estate Racing; Phoenix Thoroughbred Limited 1
- Trainer: Martyn Meade
- Record: 10: 5-3-0
- Earnings: £904,358

Major wins
- July Stakes (2018); Phoenix Stakes (2018); Commonwealth Cup (2019); Prix Maurice de Gheest (2019)

Advertise (foaled 23 February 2016) is a British Thoroughbred racehorse. As a two-year-old in 2018 he was one of the best colts of his generation in Europe, winning three of his five races including the July Stakes and the Phoenix Stakes. In the following year he developed into a top-class sprinter, recording major victories in the Commonwealth Cup and the Prix Maurice de Gheest.

== Background ==
Advertise is a bay horse with a narrow white blaze bred by the Newmarket-based Cheveley Park Stud. In August 2017 the yearling was put up for auction at Goffs and was bought for £60,000 by the bloodstock dealer Dermot Farrington. The colt's ownership was held by Manton Estate Racing before passing to Phoenix Thoroughbreds. He was sent into training with Martyn Meade at the Manton Estate near Manton, Wiltshire.

He was from the fifth crop of foals sired by Showcasing, a stallion who won two of his seven races including the 2009 edition of the Gimcrack Stakes. His other foals have included Quiet Reflection, Toocoolforschool (Mill Reef Stakes), Prize Exhibit (San Clemente Handicap), Tasleet (Greenham Stakes) and Cappella Sansevero (Round Tower Stakes). Advertise's dam Furbelow showed modest racing ability, winning one minor race as a three-year-old in 2012. She was a granddaughter of Heart of Joy, who won the Nell Gwyn Stakes in England and the Palomar Handicap in the United States and was a distant relative of St Paddy and Flying Water.

== Racing career ==
=== 2018: two-year-old season ===
Advertise made his racecourse debut in a maiden race over six furlongs at Newbury Racecourse on 18 May in which he was ridden by Richard Kingscote and started the 4/1 joint-favourite in a twelve-runner field. After being restrained in the early stages he finished strongly, took the lead inside the last 100 yards and won by three quarters of a length from Pogo. In June the colt was moved up sharply in class for the Group 2 Coventry Stakes at Royal Ascot. Ridden by Oisin Murphy he started at 10/1 and finished strongly to finish second of the 23 runners behind the John Gosden-trained Calyx who raced up the opposite side of the straight. Frankie Dettori took the ride when Advertise started the 11/10 favourite for the July Stakes at Newmarket Racecourse on 12 July. The best-fancied of his seven opponents were Legends of War (from the Gosden stable), Van Beethoven (Railway Stakes) and Konchek. He was settled towards the rear of the field before making good progress in the last quarter mile, taking the lead inside the final furlong and winning "comfortably" by a length from Konchek. Martyn Meade commented "Wow, that's all I can say. I'm so thrilled. He's done everything right, but of course you never know until you get on to the racetrack. I think he could prove to be a really good horse. He's got a bright future. I'm very much thinking 2000 Guineas next year – over an extra distance I think he'll be a better horse".

Dettori was again in the saddle when Advertise was sent to Ireland to contest the Group 1 Phoenix Stakes over six furlongs at the Curragh on 12 August. Before the race Meade had been very confident about the colt's future objectives, saying "It's just a case of which race we want to go and win", leading to accusations of "arrogance" on Twitter. His opponents included three from Aidan O'Brien's Ballydoyle stable, namely Sergei Prokofiev (Rochestown Stakes), The Irish Rover and the filly So Perfect (Grangecon Stud Stakes), while the five runner field was completed by the Jessica Harrington-trained Indigo Balance. In a change of tactics, Advertise disputed the lead from the start, established an advantage in the last quarter mile and won by half a length from So Perfect. Dettori said "he's got a great temperament and he really wants to do it for you". After becoming the first British trainer to win the race for over 20 years Meade commented "I've been quite bullish about this horse and luckily it's paid off, otherwise I might have had to eat my words. We'll give him a bit of a break and then go for the Dewhurst or something like that I suppose. The big question is if he'll get a mile, but he'll definitely get seven. It was a great ride by Frankie and it's great to have him on board. As he said to me after he won the July Stakes, "send him anywhere you like" and that proved to be right".

After an absence of two months, Advertise returned in the Group 1 Dewhurst Stakes over seven furlongs at Newmarket on 12 October and started at odds of 7/1 in a seven-runner field. Ridden by Murphy he took the lead inside the final furlong but was overtaken and beaten into second place by Too Darn Hot.

In the official ratings of European juveniles for 2018 Advertise was given a mark of 119, making him the fourth best two-year-old of the year behind Too Darn Hot, Quorto and Ten Sovereigns.

=== 2019: three-year-old season ===
On his three-year-old debut Advertise was one of seventeen colts to contest the 211th running of the 2000 Guineas over the Rowley Mile at Newmarket on 4 May. He started at odds of 11/1 but was never in contention and came home fifteenth, more than nineteen lengths by the winner Magna Grecia. At Royal Ascot on 21 June the colt was dropped back in distance for the Commonwealth Cup over six furlongs and started the 8/1 fifth choice in a nine-runner field. Ten Sovereigns started favourite while the best fancied of the other runners were Jash (King Charles II Stakes), Hello Youmzain and Khadeem (Carnarvon Stakes). Ridden by Dettori, Advertise was in contention from the start, took the lead jut inside the final furlong and kept on well to win by a length and a half from Forever In Dreams (also owned by Phoenix Thoroughbreds) with Hello Youmzain and Ten Sovereigns close behind in third and fourth. Martyn Meade, whose trainees had been running inexplicably poorly in the spring said "There's obviously huge elation but certainly relief as well, as the horses have been well under par. He's only had one bad run in the and I've always believed in him. He was not right at Newmarket; we wanted to see if he got the mile but never found out that day, and we decided to go back to what we know over six, where we knew he was so good last year."

Three weeks after his win at Ascot, Advertise started 3/1 favourite when he was matched against older horses for the first time in the July Cup over six furlongs at Newmarket. He was in contention throughout the race and stayed on well but proved no match for Ten Sovereigns who beat him into second place by two and three quarter lengths. The colt was then sent to France for the Prix Maurice de Gheest over 1300 metres at Deauville Racecourse in which he was partnered by Dettori and went off the 2.2/1 favourite. His fourteen opponents included Space Blues (Surrey Stakes), Polydream (winner of the race in 2018), One Master (Prix de la Forêt), Pretty Pollyanna, King Malpic (Prix de Ris-Orangis), Le Brivido (Jersey Stakes) and Brando (winner in 2017). After tracking the leaders Advertise took the lead 300 metres from the finish and held off a late challenge from Brando to win by a neck. Dettori commented "he showed a good turn of foot... He was just idling a bit, but when he felt Brando coming, he took off again... he's a tough horse. He doesn't know how to run a bad race."

On 19 October Advertise was made 4/1 joint favourite (alongside One Master) for the British Champions Sprint Stakes over six furlongs at Ascot. Racing on heavy ground he was in contention for most of the way but was unable to quicken in the closing stages and came home seventh behind the 33/1 upset winner Donjuan Triumphant. On 1 November it was announced that Advertise had been retired from racing and that he would begin his stud career at the National Stud in 2020.

== Pedigree ==
Pedigree of Advertise (GB), bay colt, 2016
Sire Showcasing (GB) 2007	Oasis Dream; 2000	Green Desert (USA)	Danzig
Sire Showcasing (GB) 2007	Oasis Dream; 2000	Green Desert (USA)	Foreign Courier
Sire Showcasing (GB) 2007	Oasis Dream; 2000	Hope (IRE)	Dancing Brave (USA)
Sire Showcasing (GB) 2007	Oasis Dream; 2000	Hope (IRE)	Bahamian
Sire Showcasing (GB) 2007	Arabesque; 1997	Zafonic (USA)	Gone West
Sire Showcasing (GB) 2007	Arabesque; 1997	Zafonic (USA)	Zaizafon
Sire Showcasing (GB) 2007	Arabesque; 1997	Prophecy (IRE)	Warning (GB)
Sire Showcasing (GB) 2007	Arabesque; 1997	Prophecy (IRE)	Andaleeb (USA)
Dam Furbelow (GB) 2009	Pivotal; 1993	Polar Falcon (USA)	Nureyev
Dam Furbelow (GB) 2009	Pivotal; 1993	Polar Falcon (USA)	Marie d'Argonne (FR)
Dam Furbelow (GB) 2009	Pivotal; 1993	Fearless Revival	Cozzene (USA)
Dam Furbelow (GB) 2009	Pivotal; 1993	Fearless Revival	Stufida
Dam Furbelow (GB) 2009	Red Tiara (USA); 1996	Mr. Prospector	Raise a Native
Dam Furbelow (GB) 2009	Red Tiara (USA); 1996	Mr. Prospector	Gold Digger
Dam Furbelow (GB) 2009	Red Tiara (USA); 1996	Heart of Joy	Lypheor (GB)
Dam Furbelow (GB) 2009	Red Tiara (USA); 1996	Heart of Joy	Mythographer (Family: 14-c)
