= Rochestown Stakes =

Rochestown Stakes
2018
Sergei Prokofiev	Andre Amar	Offline

Previous years
2016
Peace Envoy	Lundy	Moritzburg
2015
Argentero	Galway Bay	Birchwood
2014
Kool Kompany	Toscanini	War Envoy
2013
Stubbs	Sacha Park	Club Wexford
2012
Dawn Approach	Mister Marc	Tennessee Wildcat
2011
Lilbourne Lad	Snowflake Dancer	French Emperor
2010
Clondinnery	Moment Of Weakness	Highly Composed
2009
Love Lockdown	King Ledley	Roi De Vitesse
2008
Heart Of Fire	Spring Tale	Three Way Stretch
2007
Irish Jig	May Meeting	Another Express
2006
He's A Decoy	Varsity Blues	Howya Now Kid
2005
Golden Arrow	Duff	Cappa Brack
2004
Man O World	Joyce	Clash Of The Ash
2003
King Hesperus	Jemmy's Brother	Wathab

The Rochestown Stakes is a Listed flat horse race in Ireland open to thoroughbreds aged two years only. It is run at Naas over a distance of 6 furlongs (1,206 metres), and it is scheduled to take place each year in late May or early June.

The race was first run in 1993. It was run at Leopardstown until 2004 and at Cork from 2005 until 2010.

== Winners ==
Year	Winner	Jockey	Trainer	Time
1993	Cois Na Tine	Christy Roche	Jim Bolger	1:14.10
1994	Tante Zoe	Michael Kinane	Noel Meade	1:15.60
1995	Sunset Reigns	Stephen Craine	Aidan O'Brien	1:13.40
1996	Azra	Kevin Manning	Jim Bolger	1:12.50
1997	Flame Violet	Christy Roche	Aidan O'Brien	1:14.10
1998	Pharmacist	Michael Kinane	Dermot Weld	1:13.10
1999	Monashee Mountain	Michael Kinane	Aidan O'Brien	1:15.10
2000	Pirate Of Penzance	Michael Kinane	Aidan O'Brien	1:17.20
2001	High Society	Johnny Murtagh	Edward Lynam	1:13.10
2002	Akanti	Wayne Smith	Ger Lyons	1:19.60
2003	King Hesperus	Michael Kinane	Aidan O'Brien	1:16.70
2004	Man O World	Pat Smullen	Dermot Weld	1:14.10
2005	Golden Arrow	Pat Smullen	Dermot Weld	1:10.40
2006	He's A Decoy	Michael Kinane	David Wachman	1:11.50
2007	Irish Jig	Niall McCullagh	Ger Lyons	1:11.93
2008	Heart Of Fire	Declan McDonogh	Kevin Prendergast	1:12.37
2009	Love Lockdown	Keegan Latham	Ger Lyons	1:10.92
2010	Clondinnery	Keegan Latham	Ger Lyons	1:09.32
2011	Lilbourne Lad	Richard Hughes	Richard Hannon Sr.	1:11.24
2012	Dawn Approach	Kevin Manning	Jim Bolger	1:11.48
2013	Stubbs	Joseph O'Brien	Aidan O'Brien	1:11.90
2014	Kool Kompany	Pat Dobbs	Richard Hannon Jr.	1:11.29
2015	Argentero	Colin Keane	Ger Lyons	1:17.55
2016	Peace Envoy	Ryan Moore	Aidan O'Brien	1:13.06
2017	True Blue Moon	Donnacha O'Brien	Joseph O'Brien	1:02.00
2018	Sergei Prokofiev	Ryan Moore	Aidan O'Brien	1:00.80

== See also ==
- Horse racing in Ireland
- List of Irish flat horse races
