= Navigation Stakes =

Flat horse race in Ireland

Navigation Stakes
2024
| Mutasarref | Dublin | Wigmore Street |

Previous years
2023
Foniska | Snapraeterea | Clever And Cool
2022
Statement | Monaasib | Georgeville
2021
Queenship | April Showers | Oodnadatta

2020-2011
2020
Keats | Free Solo | Fame And Acclaim
2019
Up Helly Aa | Pincheck | Laughifuwant
2018
Ship Of Dreams | North Face | Moteo
2017
Brendan Brackan | Onenightidreamed | Bumbasina
2016
Brendan Brackan | Black Hawk War | Tipstaff
2015
Brendan Brackan | Akira | Corail
2014
Sun On The Run | Sruthan | Stuccodor
2013
Rich Coast | Brendan Brackan | Beacon Lodge
2012
Chrysanthemum | Barack | Rock Critic
2011
Look At Me | Defining Year | Stunning View

2010-2006
2010
Ask Jack | Hujaylea | Separate Ways
2009
Alaiyma | Jumbajukiba | Six of Hearts
2008
Almass | Jalmira | Rain Rush
2007
Jalmira | Hard Rock City | Anna's Rock
2006
Farinelli | Bawaader | Harrington

The Navigation Stakes is a Listed flat horse race in Ireland open to thoroughbreds aged three years or older. It is run at Cork over a distance of 1 mile (1,609 metres), and it is scheduled to take place each year in late September or early October.

The race was first run in 2006. Prior to 2021 it was run over a distance of around 1 mile and half a furlong , with the exact distance varying from 1 mile and 125 yards to 1 mile and 50 yards.

== Records ==
Most successful horse (3 Wins):

- Brendan Brackan - (2015,2016,2017)

Leading jockey (3 wins):

- Colin Keane - Brendan Brackan (2017), Mutasarref (2024), Purview (2025)

Leading trainer (4 wins):

- Ger Lyons – Brendan Brackan (2015,2016,2017), Mutasarref (2024)

== Winners ==
| Year | Winner | Age | Jockey | Trainer | Time |
|---|---|---|---|---|---|
| 2006 | Farinelli | 3 | Niall McCullagh | John Oxx | 1:49.97 |
| 2007 | Jalmira | 6 | Billy Lee | Charlie Swan | 1:46.36 |
| 2008 | Almass | 3 | Declan McDonogh | Kevin Prendergast | 1:54.05 |
| 2009 | Alaiyma | 3 | Michael Kinane | John Oxx | 1:45.77 |
| 2010 | Ask Jack | 6 | Wayne Lordan | Joseph G Murphy | 1:45.23 |
| 2011 | Look At Me | 3 | Joseph O'Brien | Aidan O'Brien | 1:52.05 |
| 2012 | Chrysanthemum | 4 | Sean Foley | David Wachman | 1:49.96 |
| 2013 | Rich Coast | 5 | Niall McCullagh | Johnny Murtagh | 1:48.87 |
| 2014 | Sun On The Run | 4 | Kevin Manning | Jim Bolger | 1:53.35 |
| 2015 | Brendan Brackan | 6 | Gary Carroll | Ger Lyons | 1:46.73 |
| 2016 | Brendan Brackan | 7 | Gary Carroll | Ger Lyons | 1:54.12 |
| 2017 | Brendan Brackan | 8 | Colin Keane | Ger Lyons | 1:54.68 |
| 2018 | Ship of Dreams | 3 | Wayne Lordan | Joseph O'Brien | 1:46.54 |
| 2019 | Up Helly Aa | 3 | Billy Lee | Willie McCreery | 1:52.95 |
| 2020 | Keats | 3 | Seamie Heffernan | Aidan O'Brien | 1:43.49 |
| 2021 | Queenship | 3 | Mikey Sheehy | Joseph O'Brien | 1:46.89 |
| 2022 | Statement | 4 | Dylan Browne McMonagle | Joseph O'Brien | 1:39.34 |
| 2023 | Foniska | 3 | Shane Foley | Jessica Harrington | 1:45.41 |
| 2024 | Mutasarref | 6 | Colin Keane | Ger Lyons | 1:39.36 |
| 2025 | Purview | 3 | Colin Keane | Dermot Weld | 2:13.56 |
| 2026 | Shaihaan | 3 | Chris Hayes | Donnacha O'Brien | 2:34.51 |

== See also ==
- Horse racing in Ireland
- List of Irish flat horse races
