= Knockaire Stakes =

Flat horse race in Ireland

Knockaire Stakes
2016
Sovereign Debt	Blue De Vega	Downforce

Previous years
2015
Sovereign Debt	Iveagh Gardens	The Happy Prince
2014
Kanes Pass	Francis Of Assisi	Witches Brew
2013
Francis Of Assisi	Big Break	Pop Art
2012
Lady Wingshot	Ondeafears	Core Element
2011
Enchanted Evening	Shirley Blake	Catch The Eye
2010
Luisant	Stunning View	Crystal Gal
2009
Libano	Rayeni	Luisant
2008
Almass	Girouette	Al Qasi
2007
Lord Admiral	Excelerate	Mooretown Lady
2006
Modeeroch	Ugo Fire	Eastern Appeal
2005
Sugarhoneybaby	Hard Rock City	Turnkey
2004
Fearn Royal	Mombassa	Alone He Stands
2003
Bon Expresso	Dixie Evans	Livadiya

The Knockaire Stakes is a Listed flat horse race in Ireland open to thoroughbreds aged three years or older. It is run at Leopardstown over a distance of 7 furlongs (1,408 metres), and it is scheduled to take place each year in October.

== Records ==
Most successful horse (2 wins):

- Sovereign Debt – 2015, 2016
- Norwalk Havoc - 2024, 2025

Leading jockey (4 wins):

- Kevin Manning – Free To Speak (1998), Just Special (2002), Bon Expresso (2003), Modeeroch (2006)

Leading trainer (7 wins):

- Dermot Weld – Low Key Affair (1994), Nautical Pet (1995), Free To Speak (1998), Major Force (2000), Libano (2009), Enchanted Evening (2011), Making Light (2017)

== Winners ==
Year	Winner	Age	Jockey	Trainer	Time
1994	Low Key Affair	3	Pat Shanahan	Dermot Weld	1:37.80
1995	Nautical Pet	3	Pat Shanahan	Dermot Weld	1:32.80
1996	Wizard King	5	George Duffield	Sir Mark Prescott	1:31.90
1997	Orange Grouse	4	Stephen Craine	Liam Browne	1:38.90
1998	Free To Speak	6	Kevin Manning	Dermot Weld	1:40.60
1999	One Won One	5	Johnny Murtagh	Joanna Morgan	1:37.60
2000	Major Force	4	Pat Smullen	Dermot Weld	1:33.20
2001	Shoal Creek	4	Michael Kinane	Aidan O'Brien	1:33.80
2002	Just Special	4	Kevin Manning	Michael Grassick	1:35.80
2003	Bon Expresso	3	Kevin Manning	Jim Bolger	1:28.00
2004	Fearn Royal	5	Colm O'Donoghue	Peter Casey	1:34.20
2005	Sugarhoneybaby	4	Johnny Murtagh	Noel Meade	1:35.00
2006	Modeeroch	3	Kevin Manning	Jim Bolger	1:30.80
2007	Lord Admiral	6	Michael Kinane	Charles O'Brien	1:26.30
2008	Almass	3	Declan McDonogh	Kevin Prendergast	1:31.12
2009	Libano	3	Pat Smullen	Dermot Weld	1:32.56
2010	Luisant	7	Fran Berry	James Nash	1:34.41
2011	Enchanted Evening	5	Pat Shanahan	Dermot Weld	1:31.58
2012	Lady Wingshot	3	Ronan Whelan	Jim Bolger	1:33.52
2013	Francis Of Assisi	3	Seamie Heffernan	Aidan O'Brien	1:28.15
2014	Kanes Pass	5	Billy Lee	Willie McCreery	1:29.26
2015	Sovereign Debt	6	Chris Hayes	David Nicholls	1:31.23
2016	Sovereign Debt	7	Declan McDonogh	David Nicholls	1:28.57
2017	Making Light (Note: Larchmont Lad finished first in 2017 but was placed second after a stewards' enquiry)	3	Leigh Roche	Dermot Weld	1:32.83
2018	Smash Williams	5	Kevin Manning	Jim Bolger	1:30.93
2019	Psychadelic Funk	5	Gary Carroll	Ger Lyons	1:36.41
2020	Surrounding	7	Ronan Whelan	Michael Halford	1:31.47
2021	Masen	3	Colin Keane	Ger Lyons	1:28.02
2022	Power Under Me	4	Colin Keane	Ger Lyons	1:46.95
2023	Mutasarref	5	Colin Keane	Ger Lyons	1:48.47
2024	Norwalk Havoc	3	Shane Foley	Jessica Harrington	1:46.08
2025	Norwalk Havoc	4	Seamie Heffernan	Jessica Harrington	1:48.03
2026	King Cuan	5	Billy Lee	Paddy Twomey	1:47.99

== See also ==
- Horse racing in Ireland
- List of Irish flat horse races
