= Midsummer Sprint Stakes =

Flat horse race in Ireland

Midsummer Sprint Stakes
2026
Kendall Roy	Likedbymike	Erosandpsyche

Previous years
2025
Powerful Nation	Songhai	Erosandpsyche
2024
Clarendon House	Erosandpsyche	Jakajaro
2023
Go Athletico	Ano Syra	Lady Tilbury
2022
Geocentric	Pirate Jenny	Chocquinto
2021
Logo Hunter	Dickiedooda	Erosandpsyche

2020-2011
2020
Make A Challenge	Urban Beat	Buffer Zone
2019
El Astronaute	Smash Williams	Ardhoomey
2018
Dali	Mirza	Snowstar
2017
Hit The Bid	Go Kart	Abstraction
2016
Spirit Quartz	Ardhoomey	Fainleog
2015
Line Of Reason	Ardhoomey	Russian Soul
2014
Timeless Call	Jamesie	Master Speaker
2013
Cape Of Approval	Maarek	Red Dubawi
2012
Mirza	My Girl Anna	Gossamer Seed
2011
Inxile	Liberty Lady	Oor Jock

The Midsummer Sprint Stakes is a Listed flat horse race in Ireland open to thoroughbreds aged three years or older. It is run at Cork over a distance of 5 furlongs (1,006 metres), and it is scheduled to take place each year in June.

The race was first run in 2011.

== Winners ==
Year	Winner	Age	Jockey	Trainer	Time
2011	Inxile	6	Adrian Nicholls	David Nicholls
2012	Mirza	5	Fran Berry	Rae Guest	0:59.84
2013	Cape Of Approval	4	Billy Lee	Tommy Stack	0:58.60
2014	Timeless Call	6	Pat Smullen	Reginald Roberts	0:57.56
2015	Line Of Reason	5	Paul Mulrennan	Paul Midgley	0:55.90
2016	Spirit Quartz	8	Pat Smullen	Robert Cowell	0:57.88
2017	Hit The Bid	3	Leigh Roche	Darren Bunyan	0:57.40
2018	Dali (Note: The 2018 race took place at Naas)	3	Donnacha O'Brien	Aidan O'Brien	0:59.70
2019	El Astronaute	6	Jason Hart	John Quinn	0:58.70
2020	Make a Challenge (Note: The 2020 race took place at The Curragh in July over 5½ furlongs due to the COVID-19 pandemic in the Republic of Ireland)	5	Joe Doyle	Denis Hogan	1:07.22
2021	Logo Hunter	3	Billy Lee	Michael Browne	1:00.07
2022	Geocentric	3	Colin Keane	Ger Lyons	0:58.28
2023	Go Athletico	5	Ronan Whelan	Adrian McGuinness	1:00.93
2024	Clarendon House	6	Colin Keane	Robert Cowell	0:58.60
2025	Powerful Nation	3	Andrew Slattery	Andrew Slattery	0:59.33
2026	Kendall Roy	5	Chris Hayes	Kate McGivern	0:59.51

== See also ==
- Horse racing in Ireland
- List of Irish flat horse races
