= El Gran Senor Stakes =

Flat horse race in Ireland

El Gran Senor Stakes
2025
Thesecretadversary	Brussels	Suspicious Mindz

Previous years
2024
January	Beckman	Green Triangle
2022
Hellsing	Papilio	Lakota Seven
2021
Seisai	Tuwaiq	Glengarra

2020-2011
2020
Sweet Gardenia	Ontario	Vafortino
2019
Justifier	Harpocrates	Rebel Tale
2018
Christmas	Highland Fortune	Wargrave
2016
Capri	Boyfriend Brian	Intern
2015
Waipu Cove	Play The Game	Glamorous Approach
2014
Convergence	East India	King Christophe
2013
Indian Maharaja	Ceisteach	Fly To The Moon
2012
First Cornerstone	Orgilgo Bay	Dibayani
2011
Strait Of Zanzibar	Battle Of Saratoga	East Meets West

2010-2003
2010
Snow Watch	Triple Eight	Jackaroo
2009
Viscount Nelson	Bobbyscot	Kingdom Of Munster
2008
Westphalia	Sawtooth Mountain	Driving Snow
2007
Lisvale	Achill Island	Capt Chaos
2006
Zafonical Storm	Chinese Whisper	Warriors Key
2005
Rhythm'n Roots	Altius	Royal Intrigue
2004
Gaff	Zelkova	Ridder
2003
Simple Exchange	Cornwall	Amalie Bay

The El Gran Senor Stakes is a Listed flat horse race in Ireland open to thoroughbreds aged two years only. It is run at Tipperary over a distance of 7 furlongs and 100 yards (1,513 metres), and it is scheduled to take place each year in August.

The race was first run in 2003 as the El Gran Senor Stakes. However, as is the case for the Tipperary Stakes, the name is regularly changed to advertise one of the Coolmore Stud stallions. Churchill has been the beneficiary since 2020, preceded by Caravaggio (2018-19), Ivawood (2017), Canford Cliffs (2012-2016), Hurricane Run (2008-2011) and Ad Valorem (2007).

== Records ==
Leading jockey (4 wins):

- Colin Keane – Convergence (2014), Waipu Cove (2015), Justifier (2019), Hellsing (2022)

Leading trainer (8 wins):

- Aidan O'Brien – Westphalia (2008), Viscount Nelson (2009), Indian Maharaja (2013), Capri (2016), Ballet Shoes (2017), Christmas (2018), January (2024), Sergei Diaghilev (2026)

== Winners ==
Year	Winner	Jockey	Trainer	Time
2003	Simple Exchange	Pat Smullen	Dermot Weld	1:24.10
2004	Gaff	Pat Smullen	Dermot Weld	1:30.00
2005	Rhythm'n Roots	Davy Moran	Jim Bolger	1:42.20
2006	Zafonical Storm	Davy Moran	Brendan Duke	1:40.40
2007	Lisvale	Wayne Lordan	David Wachman	1:39.10
2008	Westphalia	Johnny Murtagh	Aidan O'Brien	1:39.77
2009	Viscount Nelson	Johnny Murtagh	Aidan O'Brien	1:37.61
2010	Snow Watch	Declan McDonogh	Kevin Prendergast	1:35.67
2011	Strait Of Zanzibar	Shane Foley	Ken Condon	1:37.53
2012	First Cornerstone	Chris Hayes	Andy Oliver	1:38.82
2013	Indian Maharaja	Joseph O'Brien	Aidan O'Brien	1:33.96
2014	Convergence	Colin Keane	Ger Lyons	1:35.59
2015	Waipu Cove	Colin Keane	Ger Lyons	1:40.86
2016	Capri	Seamie Heffernan	Aidan O'Brien	1:36.43
2017	Ballet Shoes	Donnacha O'Brien	Aidan O'Brien	1:37.40
2018	Christmas	Donnacha O'Brien	Aidan O'Brien	1:36.03
2019	Justifier	Colin Keane	Ger Lyons	1:39.20
2020	Sweet Gardenia (Note: The 2020 race was run in October due to the COVID-19 pandemic in the Republic of Ireland)	Robbie Colgan	John Joseph Murphy	1:38.92
2021	Seisai	Shane Crosse	Joseph O'Brien	1:40.86
2022	Hellsing	Colin Keane	Ger Lyons	1:35.12
2023	Warnie	Dylan Browne McMonagle	Joseph O'Brien	1:41.98
2024	January	Ryan Moore	Aidan O'Brien	1:35.09
2025	Thesecretadversary	Seamie Heffernan	Fozzy Stack	1:37.55
2026	Sergei Diaghilev (Note: The 2026 race was run at Gowran Park)	Wayne Lordan	Aidan O'Brien	1:39.47

== See also ==
- Horse racing in Ireland
- List of Irish flat horse races
