= Tipperary Stakes =

Flat horse race in Ireland

Tipperary Stakes
2025
Arugam Bay	First Approach	Fresh Fade

Previous years
2024
Usdi Atohi	Powerful Nation	Shamrock Breeze
2023
Son Of Corballis	Alabama	Gaenari
2022
Wodao	Ardad's Great	The Antarctic
2021
Sacred Bridge	Misty Ayr	Harmony Rose

2020-2011
2020
Dickiedooda	Grammata	Chief Little Hawk
2019
Strive For Glory	Air Force Jet	Isabeau
2018
Land Force	Mintd	Usra
2017
Sirici	Actress	Now You're Talking
2016
Yulong Baobei	Swish	Mirdif
2015
Promised Money	Independence Day	Shrill
2014
Accepted	Simply A Star	Avenue Montaigne
2013
Sacred Aspect	Abbakova	Hurryupharriet
2012
Parliament Square	Boston Rocker	Zoola
2011
Requinto	An Ghalanta	Dam Beautiful

2010-2001
2010
Anadolu	Moonlit Garden	Cloneylass
2009
Our Jonathan	Rock Jock	Dream Deer
2008
Senor Mirasol	Nubar Lady	Roof Fiddle
2007
Porto Marmay	Shivering	Rose Rouge
2006
Flash McGahon	Spirit Of Pearl	Mood Music
2005
Dandy Man	Waterways	Cappa Brack
2004
Kay Two	Tournedos	Dancing Duchess
2003
Nights Cross	Blue Crush	Miss Serendipity
2002
Shizao	Miguel Cervantes	Seattle Queen
2001
Lahinch	Church Cross	Real Delight

The Tipperary Stakes is a Listed flat horse race in Ireland open to thoroughbreds aged two years only. It is run at Tipperary over a distance of five furlongs (1,006 metres), and it is scheduled to take place each year in July.

The race was first run in 2001 as the Entrepreneur Stakes. It was renamed the Tipperary Stakes the following year, but generally also carries the name of a Coolmore Stud stallion, initially Danehill Dancer and more recently Excelebration, Pride of Dubai and U S Navy Flag.

== Records ==
Leading jockey (3 wins):

- Shane Foley – Sacred Aspect (2013), Yulong Baobei (2016), Dickiedooda (2020)

Leading trainer (4 wins):

- Aidan O'Brien – Lahinch (2001), Parliament Square (2012), Land Force (2018), Carry The Flag (2026)

== Winners ==
Year	Winner	Jockey	Trainer	Time
2001	Lahinch	Colm O'Donoghue	Aidan O'Brien	0:59.60
2002	Shizao	Colm O'Donoghue	Jim Bolger	0:57.30
2003	Nights Cross	Tony Culhane	Mick Channon	0:56.80
2004	Kay Two	Declan McDonogh	Frances Crowley	1:03.40
2005	Dandy Man	Pat Shanahan	Con Collins	0:57.70
2006	Flash McGahon	Fran Berry	John Oxx	0:58.90
2007	Porto Marmay	Declan McDonogh	Ken Condon	1:02.34
2008	Senor Mirasol	Neil Callan	Kevin Ryan	1:00.89
2009	Our Jonathan	Fran Berry	Kevin Ryan	1:00.27
2010	Anadolu	Pat Shanahan	Tracey Collins	0:59.13
2011	Requinto	Wayne Lordan	David Wachman	0:57.84
2012	Parliament Square	Joseph O'Brien	Aidan O'Brien	1:00.68
2013	Sacred Aspect	Shane Foley	Ken Condon	0:57.90
2014	Accepted	Billy Lee	Tommy Stack	0:58.20
2015	Promised Money	Colin Keane	Edward Lynam	0:59.52
2016	Yulong Baobei	Shane Foley	Michael Halford	0:59.40
2017	Sirici	Chris Hayes	Fozzy Stack	0:58.10
2018	Land Force	Donnacha O'Brien	Aidan O'Brien	0:58.09
2019	Strive For Glory	Billy Lee	Robert Cowell	0:57.64
2020	Dickiedooda (Note: The 2020 race was run at Cork due to the COVID-19 pandemic in the Republic of Ireland)	Shane Foley	Jessica Harrington	0:59.38
2021	Sacred Bridge	Colin Keane	Ger Lyons	0:57.21
2022	Wodao	Gavin Ryan	Donnacha O'Brien	0:59.82
2023	Son Of Corballis	Declan McDonogh	Kieran Cotter	0:58.33
2024	Usdi Atohi	Gavin Ryan	Donnacha O'Brien	0:57.14
2025	Arugam Bay	Chris Hayes	Eddie & Patrick Hardy	0:57.13
2026	Carry The Flag	Ronan Whelan	Aidan O'Brien	0:59.55

== See also ==
- Horse racing in Ireland
- List of Irish flat horse races
