= Ruby Stakes =

Flat horse race in Ireland

Ruby Stakes
2026
Jagged Edge	Carolina Jetstream	Hardy Warrior

Previous years
2025
Thalara	Duckadilly	Soft Winds
2024
One Look	Princess Child	Mexicali Rose
2023
Salt Lake City	Didn'thavemuchtodo	Howyoulikethat
2022
Charterhouse	Panama Red	Haziya
2021
Horoscope	Masen	Charterhouse

2020-2011
2020
So Wonderful	Up Helly Aa	Helvic Dream
2019
Lady Wannabe	Waitingfortheday	Onlyhuman
2018
I Can Fly	Rionach	Marshall Jennings
2017
Canary Row	Bumbasina	Duchess Of France
2016
Erysimum	Marshall Jennings	Cailin Mor
2015
Algonquin	Devonshire	Sacrificial
2014
Brooch	Akira	Colour Blue
2013
Wannabe Better	Captain Joy	Elleval
2012
Soon	Alla Speranza	Barack
2011
Wild Wind	Barack	Bay Knight

2010-2001
2010
Steinbeck	Ask Jack	Fourpenny Lane
2009
Poet	Four Winds	Windsor Palace
2008
Mystical Lady	Mr Medici	Northgate
2007
Deauville Vision	Crooked Throw	Sandtime
2006
Kalderon	Arch Rebel	Cougar Bay
2005
Common World	Queen Titi	Fit The Cove
2004
Eklim	Fearn Royal	Major Title
2003
Latino Magic	Hymn Of Love	Royal Fortune
2002
Blatant	Maumee	Aquila Oculus
2001
One Won One	Katherine Seymour	Ventura

2000-1997
2000
Rush Brook	Tushna	Cobourg Lodge
1999
Free To Speak	Danse Classique	Moiseyev
1998
Lil's Boy	Heed My Warning	Playacting
1997
On Fair Stage	Wray	Inchacooley

The Ruby Stakes is a Listed flat horse race in Ireland open to thoroughbred horses aged three years or older. It is run at Killarney over a distance of 1 mile and 20 yards (1,628 metres), and it is scheduled to take place each year in August.

The race was first run in 1997 and took place at Tralee until the racecourse was closed in 2007, and at Dundalk in 2008.

Since being transferred to Killarney the race title has been extended to include the name of the legendary Irish trainer, Vincent O'Brien.

== Records ==
Leading jockey (5 wins):

- Seamie Heffernan – Common World (2005), Steinbeck (2010), Soon (2012), I Can Fly (2018), So Wonderful (2020)

Leading trainer (8 wins):

- Aidan O'Brien - Mystical Lady (2008), Poet (2009), Steinbeck (2010), Wild Wind (2011), Soon (2012), I Can Fly (2018), So Wonderful (2020), Horoscope (2021), Salt Lake City (2023)

== Winners ==
Year	Winner	Age	Jockey	Trainer	Time
1997	On Fair Stage	4	Pat Smullen	John Oxx	1:49.00
1998	Lil's Boy	4	Kevin Manning	Jim Bolger	1:38.90
1999	Free To Speak	7	Pat Smullen	Dermot Weld	1:41.80
2000	Rush Brook	5	Fran Berry	David Wachman	1:48.80
2001	One Won One	7	Kevin Manning	Joanna Morgan	1:41.30
2002	Blatant	3	Johnny Murtagh	John Oxx	1:39.50
2003	Latino Magic	3	Robbie Burke	Robbie Osborne	1:40.30
2004	Eklim	4	Declan McDonogh	Kevin Prendergast	1:54.10
2005	Common World	6	Seamie Heffernan	Tom Hogan	1:44.50
2006	Kalderon	6	Fran Berry	Tom Hogan	1:37.44
2007	Deauville Vision	4	Rory Cleary	Michael Halford	1:51.20
2008	Mystical Lady	3	Colm O'Donoghue	Aidan O'Brien	1:36.50
2009	Poet	4	Sean Levey	Aidan O'Brien	1:46.06
2010	Steinbeck	3	Seamie Heffernan	Aidan O'Brien	1:41.88
2011	Wild Wind	3	Colm O'Donoghue	Aidan O'Brien	1:41.81
2012	Soon	3	Seamie Heffernan	Aidan O'Brien	1:48.80
2013	Wannabe Better	3	Wayne Lordan	Tommy Stack	1:40.75
2014	Brooch	3	Pat Smullen	Dermot Weld	1:42.36
2015	Algonquin	3	Kevin Manning	Jim Bolger	1:41.42
2016	Erysimum	3	Billy Lee	Willie McCreery	1:42.16
2017	Canary Row	7	Ronan Whelan	Patrick Prendergast	1:46.64
2018	I Can Fly	3	Seamie Heffernan	Aidan O'Brien	1:41.70
2019	Lady Wannabe	3	Chris Hayes	Fozzy Stack	1:42.90
2020	So Wonderful	3	Seamie Heffernan	Aidan O'Brien	1:49.89
2021	Horoscope	3	Emmet McNamara	Aidan O'Brien	1:40.55
2022	Charterhouse	4	Scott McCullagh	JJ Murphy	1:42.93
2023	Salt Lake City	3	Killian Hennessy	Aidan O'Brien	1:44.20
2024	One Look	3	Billy Lee	Paddy Twomey	1:44.41
2025	Thalara	5	Andrew Slattery	Henry de Bromhead	1:42.24
2026	Jagged Edge	4	Jack Kearney	Stephen Thorne	1:40.72

== See also ==
- Horse racing in Ireland
- List of Irish flat horse races
