= Garnet Stakes =

Flat horse race in Ireland

Garnet Stakes
2026
Princess Child	Faiyum	Glyfada

Previous years
2025
Onemoredance	Smiling	Soft Winds
2024
Azada	Sakti	Princess Child
2023
Curvature	Good Gracious	Honey Girl
2022
Toy	Sunset Shiraz	Maristella
2021
Elysium	Emphatic Answer	Oodnadatta

2020-2011
2020
Parent's Prayer	Stormy Belle	Best On Stage
2019
Silk Forest	Trethias	Jumellea
2018
Sarrocchi	Damselfly	Could It Be Love
2017
Elegant Pose	Making Light	I'm So Fancy
2016
Intimation	Rose De Pierre	Flying Fairies
2015
Queen Catrine	Assume	Tamadhor
2014
Avenue Gabriel	Fastnet Mist	Kanes Pass
2013
Wannabe Better	Mizzava	Uleavemebreathless
2012
Manieree	Shifting	Devotion
2011
Handassa	Hurricane Havoc	Empowering

2010-2005
2010
Emulous	Barring Decree	Paraphernalia
2009
Aspectoflove	She's Our Mark	Mad About You
2008
Mad About You	Kalidaha	Patio
2007
Cheyenne Star	Thoughtless Moment	Baby Blue Eyes
2006
Sina Cova	Cheyenne Star	Paris Winds
2005
Queen Titi	Adaala	Sweet Treat

The Garnet Stakes is a Listed flat horse race in Ireland open to thoroughbred fillies and mares aged three years or older. It is run at Naas over a distance of 1 mile (1,609 metres), and it is scheduled to take place each year in October.

The race was first run in 2005.

== Records ==
Leading jockey since 2005 (3 wins):

- Colin Keane – Queen Catrine (2015), Intimation (2016), Elegant Pose (2017)
- Chris Hayes - Avenue Gabriel (2014), Elysium (2021), Azada (2024)

Leading trainer since 2005 (3 wins):

- Aidan O'Brien - Queen Titi (2005), Sarrocchi (2018), Toy (2022)
- Dermot Weld - Mad About You (2008), Emulous (2010), Azada (2024)

== Winners ==
Year	Winner	Age	Jockey	Trainer	Time
2005	Queen Titi	3	Kieren Fallon	Aidan O'Brien	1:37.70
2006	Sina Cova	4	Kevin Manning	Peter Casey	1:39.42
2007	Cheyenne Star	4	Seamie Heffernan	Frances Crowley	1:39.81
2008	Mad About You	3	Pat Smullen	Dermot Weld	1:44.58
2009	Aspectoflove	3	Fran Berry	John Oxx	1:37.92
2010	Emulous	3	Pat Smullen	Dermot Weld	1:36.25
2011	Handassa	3	Declan McDonogh	Kevin Prendergast	1:41.24
2012	Manieree	4	Niall McCullagh	John Oxx	1:43.19
2013	Wannabe Better	3	Wayne Lordan	Tommy Stack	1:40.49
2014	Avenue Gabriel	3	Chris Hayes	Paul Deegan	1:39.73
2015	Queen Catrine	4	Colin Keane	Ger Lyons	1:38.05
2016	Intimation	4	Colin Keane	Sir Michael Stoute	1:46.07
2017	Elegant Pose	3	Colin Keane	Ger Lyons	1:45.17
2018	Sarrocchi	3	Seamie Heffernan	Aidan O'Brien	1:40.34
2019	Silk Forest	3	Billy Lee	Paddy Twomey	1:46.16
2020	Parent's Prayer	3	Ben Coen	Archie Watson	1:45.75
2021	Elysium	3	Chris Hayes	Noel Meade	1:45.51
2022	Toy	3	Wayne Lordan	Aidan O'Brien	1:44.68
2023	Curvature	3	Gary Carroll	Jessica Harrington	1:44.93
2024	Azada	3	Chris Hayes	Dermot Weld	1:39.08
2025	Onemoredance	3	Ben Coen	Johnny Murtagh	1:39.87
2026	Princess Child	5	Joey Sheridan	Joseph O'Brien	1:42.45

== See also ==
- Horse racing in Ireland
- List of Irish flat horse races
