= Cooley Fillies Stakes =

Flat horse race in Ireland

Cooley Fillies Stakes
2026
| Aviatrice | Never Let Go | Leading Dancer |

Previous years
2025
Aviatrice | Jancis | Naomi Lapaglia
2024
Sakti | Vivienda | Cloud Cover
2023
Many Tears | Didn'thavemuchtodo | Hodd's Girl
2022
Juncture | Voice Of Angels | Smile Of Love
2021
Friendly | Surrounding | So I Told You

2020-2011
2020
Ummalnar | Surrounding | Pretty In Grey
2019
Surrounding | Crotchet | Festina Plente
2018
Surrounding | Could It Be Love | Beach Wedding
2017
Goldrush | Aneen | Belle Boyd
2016
Kadra | Desert Haze | How High The Moon
2015
Don't Be | Facade | Back On Top
2014
Pelerin | Sea Coast | Slipper Orchid
2013
Pearl Of Africa | Daymooma | Lily's Angel
2012
Lily's Angel | Precious Stone | New Magic
2011
Clinical | Night Lily | Atlantic Swing

2010-2007
2010
Boynagh Joy | Barring Decree | Indiana Gal
2009
Fourpenny Lane | San Sicharia | Russian Empress
2008
Jalmira | Kylayne | Crossing
2007
Cheyenne Star | Bush Maiden | Jalmira

The Cooley Fillies Stakes is a listed flat horse race in Ireland open to thoroughbred fillies and mares aged three years or older. It is run at Dundalk over a distance of 1 mile (1,609 metres), and it is scheduled to take place each year in late October or early November.

The race was first run in 2007.

== Records ==
Most successful horse (2 wins):

- Surrounding – 2018, 2019
- Aviatrice - 2025, 2026

Leading jockey (3 wins):

- Colin Keane - Juncture (2022), Many Tears (2023), Sakti (2024)

Leading trainer (4 wins):

- Ger Lyons - Lily's Angel (2012), Juncture (2022), Many Tears (2023), Sakti (2024)

== Winners ==
| Year | Winner | Age | Jockey | Trainer | Time |
|---|---|---|---|---|---|
| 2007 | Cheyenne Star | 4 | Seamie Heffernan | Frances Crowley | 1:37.60 |
| 2008 | Jalmira | 7 | Billy Lee | Charlie Swan | 1:37.47 |
| 2009 | Fourpenny Lane | 4 | Johnny Murtagh | Joanna Morgan | 1:37.18 |
| 2010 | Boynagh Joy | 5 | Sean Levey | James Halpin | 1:35.35 |
| 2011 | Clinical | 3 | Seb Sanders | Sir Mark Prescott | 1:35.80 |
| 2012 | Lily's Angel | 3 | Gary Carroll | Ger Lyons | 1:35.94 |
| 2013 | Pearl Of Africa | 3 | Johnny Murtagh | Edward Lynam | 1:35.45 |
| 2014 | Pelerin | 3 | Martin Harley | Marco Botti | 1:35.13 |
| 2015 | Don't Be | 5 | Luke Morris | Sir Mark Prescott | 1:36.33 |
| 2016 | Kadra | 3 | Pat Smullen | Michael Halford | 1:36.14 |
| 2017 | Goldrush | 3 | Kevin Manning | Jim Bolger | 1:37.59 |
| 2018 | Surrounding | 5 | Shane Foley | Michael Halford | 1:37.15 |
| 2019 | Surrounding | 6 | Ronan Whelan | Michael Halford | 1:36.90 |
| 2020 | Ummalanar | 5 | Chris Hayes | William Haggas | 1:35.38 |
| 2021 | Friendly | 3 | Wayne Lordan | Aidan O'Brien | 1:35.06 |
| 2022 | Juncture | 3 | Colin Keane | Ger Lyons | 1:37.30 |
| 2023 | Many Tears | 3 | Colin Keane | Ger Lyons | 1:38.92 |
| 2024 | Sakti | 3 | Colin Keane | Ger Lyons | 1:37.83 |
| 2025 | Aviatrice | 3 | Luke McAteer | David Marnane | 1:37.70 |
| 2026 | Aviatrice | 4 | Billy Lee | David Marnane | 1:37.52 |

== See also ==
- Horse racing in Ireland
- List of Irish flat horse races
