= Star Appeal Stakes =

Flat horse race in Ireland

Star Appeal Stakes
2026
Joga Bonito	Salt Lake	Dee's Funny Girl

Previous years
2025
Andab	Which Wolf Wins	Frescobaldi
2024
Right And True	Comanche Brave	Bernard Shaw
2023
Mountain Bear	Battle Cry	Cuban Thunder
2022
Spirit Gal	Cairo	Pearling Path
2021
Snaffles	King X	Markaz Paname

2020-2011
2020
Zaffy's Pride	Magnanimous	Admiral Nelson
2019
Fort Myers	Justifier	Punita Arora
2018
No Needs Never	Old Glory	Inverleigh
2017
Riyazan	Battle Of Jericho	Lake Volta
2016
Ambassadorial	Executive Force	Leo Minor
2015
Hit It A Bomb	Siamsaiocht	Glass House
2014
Smuggler's Cove	Orcia	Fields Of May
2013
Giovanni Boldini	Mandatario	Miss Mousey
2012
Lines of Battle	Tennessee Wildcat	Hudson's Bay
2011
Bible Black	Captain Obvious	Buffalo Billy

2010-2007
2010
Warning Flag	Park Avenue	Tell The Wind
2009
Mister Tee	Famous Warrior	Miracle Match
2008
Captain Ramius	Excelente	Gluteus Maximus
2007
Great War Eagle	Going Public	Billyford

The Star Appeal Stakes is a Listed flat horse race in Ireland open to thoroughbreds aged two years old. It is run at Dundalk over a distance of 7 furlongs (1,408 metres), and it is scheduled to take place each year in October.

The race was first run in 2007.

== Records ==
Leading jockey (4 wins):

- Seamie Heffernan - Giovanni Boldini (2013), No Needs Never (2018), Spirit Gal (2022), Mountain Bear (2023)

Leading trainer (7 wins):

- Aidan O'Brien – Lines of Battle (2012), Giovanni Boldini (2013), Smuggler's Cove (2014), Hit It A Bomb (2015), Fort Myers (2019), Mountain Bear (2023), Right And True (2024)

== Winners ==
Year	Winner	Jockey	Trainer	Time
2007	Great War Eagle	Johnny Murtagh	David Wachman	1:26.14
2008	Captain Ramius	Jamie Spencer	Mark Wallace	1:25.68
2009	Mister Tee	Emmet McNamara	Ger Lyons	1:25.23
2010	Warning Flag	Johnny Murtagh	David Wachman	1:23.80
2011	Bible Black	Keagan Latham	Ger Lyons	1:24.67
2012	Lines of Battle	Joseph O'Brien	Aidan O'Brien	1:24.36
2013	Giovanni Boldini	Seamie Heffernan	Aidan O'Brien	1:25.12
2014	Smuggler's Cove	Joseph O'Brien	Aidan O'Brien	1:23.88
2015	Hit It A Bomb	Joseph O'Brien	Aidan O'Brien	1:24.05
2016	Ambassadorial	Shane Foley	Michael Halford	1:23.70
2017	Riyazan	Pat Smullen	Michael Halford	1:24.52
2018	No Needs Never	Seamie Heffernan	Joseph O'Brien	1:24.31
2019	Fort Myers	Donnacha O'Brien	Aidan O'Brien	1:25.28
2020	Zaffy's Pride	Tom Madden	Jessica Harrington	1:25.12
2021	Snaffles	Shane Crosse	Joseph O'Brien	1:25.32
2022	Spirit Gal	Seamie Heffernan	William Browne	1:24.84
2023	Mountain Bear	Seamie Heffernan	Aidan O'Brien	1:25.33
2024	Right And True	Ronan Whelan	Aidan O'Brien	1:25.92
2025	Andab	Dylan Browne McMonagle	Joseph O'Brien	1:26.09
2026	Joga Bonito	Billy Lee	Paddy Twomey	1:24.93

== See also ==
- Horse racing in Ireland
- List of Irish flat horse races
