= Listowel Stakes =

Flat horse race in Ireland

Listowel Stakes
2026
Meriden	Iron Fist	Jagged Edge

Previous years
2025
Cristal Clere	Norwalk Havoc	Soft Winds
2024
Curvature	Princess Child	Fleur De Chine
2022
Neptune Rock	Venice Biennale	Casanova
2021
Visualisation	Geometrical	Casanova

2020-2011
2020
Lady Wannabe	Keats	Flaming Moon
2019
Lancaster House	Wargrave	Winiata
2018
Panstarr	Ship Of Dreams	Hence
2017
Riven Light	Zawraq	Dew Line
2016
Champagne Or Water	In My Pocket	Dream Walker
2015
Devonshire	Alive Alive Oh	Queen Of Alba
2014
Vintage Nouveau	Tarana	Drifting Mist
2013
Eye of The Storm	Inis Meain	Leah Claire
2012
Chamonix	Demurely	Minsk
2011
What A Charm	Celtic Soprano	Freedom

The Listowel Stakes is a Listed flat horse race in Ireland open to thoroughbreds aged three years or older. It is run at Listowel over a distance of 1 mile (1,609 metres), and it is scheduled to take place each year in September.

The race was first run in 2011. Prior to 2015 it was run over 1 mile and 4 furlongs.

== Records ==
Leading jockey (2 wins):

- Joseph O'Brien – Chamonix (2012), Eye of The Storm (2013)
- Billy Lee – Devonshire (2015), Champagne Or Water (2016)
- Kevin Manning - Riven Light (2017), Panstarr (2018)
- Chris Hayes - Lady Wannabe (2020), Meriden (2026)

Leading trainer (3 wins):

- Aidan O'Brien – Chamonix (2012), Eye of The Storm (2013), Lancaster House (2019)

== Winners ==
Year	Winner	Age	Jockey	Trainer	Time
2011	What A Charm	4	Ben Curtis	John Oxx	2:45.15
2012	Chamonix	3	Joseph O'Brien	Aidan O'Brien	2:53.30
2013	Eye of The Storm	3	Joseph O'Brien	Aidan O'Brien	2:46.51
2014	Vintage Nouveau	3	Pat Smullen	Dermot Weld	2:36.27
2015	Devonshire	3	Billy Lee	Willie McCreery	1:57.64
2016	Champagne Or Water	5	Billy Lee	Willie McCreery	2:03.70
2017	Riven Light	5	Kevin Manning	Willie Mullins	2:05.65
2018	Panstarr	4	Kevin Manning	Jim Bolger	1:59.11
2019	Lancaster House	3	Donnacha O'Brien	Aidan O'Brien	1:58.47
2020	Lady Wannabe	4	Chris Hayes	Fozzy Stack	1:53.20
2021	Visualisation	3	Declan McDonogh	Joseph O'Brien	1:56.00
2022	Neptune Rock	4	Shane Crosse	Joseph O'Brien	1:50.05
2023	Maud Gonne Spirit	6	Nathan Crosse	Jessica Harrington	1:58.05
2024	Curvature	4	Gary Carroll	Jessica Harrington	1:54.68
2025	Cristal Clere	7	Seamie Heffernan	John Nallen	1:46.11
2026	Meriden	3	Chris Hayes	Denis Gerard Hogan	1:40.41

== See also ==
- Horse racing in Ireland
- List of Irish flat horse races
