= Finale Stakes =

Flat horse race in Ireland

Finale Stakes
2026
| Thread Of Gold | Contorsion | Mawhibah |

Previous years
2025
Beset | Royal Entry | Snapretend
2024
Hamish | Galileo Dame | North Africa
2023
Vischio | Helvic Dream | Time To Tell
2022
Duke De Sessa | Sunchart | Yaxeni
2021
Jason The Militant | Azallya | Layfayette

2020-2011
2020
Barrington Court | Bolivar | Zawara
2019
Warnaq | Quote | Solage
2018
Mustajeer | Whirling Dervish | Romiyna
2017
Tocco D'amore | Lagostovegas | Mustajeer
2016
Alveena | Hibiscus | Soul Searcher
2015
Variable | Ebayya | Sea Moon
2014
Second Step | Chance To Dance | Altesse
2013
Heirloom | Sir Walter Scott | Drifting Mist
2012
Midnight Soprano | Minsk | Demurely
2011
Sapphire | Kissable | Amazing Beauty

2010-2001
2010
Hazarafa | Roses For The Lady | Celtic Soprano
2009
Silverhand | Trojan War | Eytarna
2008
Jane Austen | Muskatsturm | Suailce
2007
Ezima | Attercliffe | All My Loving
2006
Frank Sonata | Scorpion | Kushnarenkovo
2005
Allexina | Foreign Affairs | Agenda
2004
Tipperary All Star | Starrystarrynight | Tarakala
2003
L'Ancresse | Scott's View | Juliette
2002
Millstreet | Starbourne | Kiltubber
2001
Diamond Trim | Masilia | Sadlers Wings

The Finale Stakes is a Listed flat horse race in Ireland open to thoroughbreds aged three years or older. It is run at Naas Racecourse over a distance of 1 mile 3 furlongs and 180 yards (2,377 metres), and it is scheduled to take place each year in late November. The 2016 race was run as the Brown Panther Stakes.

The Finale Stakes was first run in 2001. It takes place at Ireland's final flat turf meeting of the season and prior to 2017 it was run at the Curragh over 1 mile 4 furlongs in October. It was transferred to Naas when the Curragh was closed for redevelopment and continued to be run at Naas in November after the Curragh re-opened.

== Records ==
Leading jockey (6 wins):

- Pat Smullen – Diamond Trim (2001), Silverhand (2009), Sapphire (2011), Variable (2015), Alveena (2016), Tocco D'Amore (2017)

Leading trainer (6 wins):

- Dermot Weld – Diamond Trim (2001), Sapphire (2011), Variable (2015), Alveena (2016), Tocco D'Amore (2017), Duke De Sessa (2022)

== Winners ==
| Year | Winner | Age | Jockey | Trainer | Time |
|---|---|---|---|---|---|
| 2001 | Diamond Trim | 3 | Pat Smullen | Dermot Weld | 2:46.00 |
| 2002 | Millstreet | 3 | Johnny Murtagh | John Oxx | 2:42.00 |
| 2003 | L'Ancresse | 3 | Michael Kinane | Aidan O'Brien | 2:31.70 |
| 2004 | Tipperary All Star | 4 | Johnny Murtagh | Michael Halford | 2:39.00 |
| 2005 | Allexina | 3 | Michael Kinane | John Oxx | 2:40.60 |
| 2006 | Frank Sonata | 5 | Tom Queally | Mick Quinlan | 2:44.20 |
| 2007 | Ezima | 3 | Kevin Manning | Jim Bolger | 2:40.44 |
| 2008 | Jane Austen | 3 | Johnny Murtagh | Aidan O'Brien | 2:55.52 |
| 2009 | Silverhand | 5 | Pat Smullen | Noel Meade | 2:46.41 |
| 2010 | Hazarafa | 3 | Ben Curtis | John Oxx | 2:41.88 |
| 2011 | Sapphire | 3 | Pat Smullen | Dermot Weld | 2:42.40 |
| 2012 | Midnight Soprano | 5 | Chris Hayes | Paul Deegan | 2:56.95 |
| 2013 | Heirloom | 3 | Joseph O'Brien | Aidan O'Brien | 2:34.88 |
| 2014 | Second Step | 3 | Andrea Atzeni | Luca Cumani | 2:38.00 |
| 2015 | Variable | 3 | Pat Smullen | Dermot Weld | 2:37.26 |
| 2016 | Alveena | 4 | Pat Smullen | Dermot Weld | 2:38.83 |
| 2017 | Tocco D'Amore | 3 | Pat Smullen | Dermot Weld | 2:45.70 |
| 2018 | Mustajeer | 5 | Colin Keane | Ger Lyons | 2:33.42 |
| 2019 | Warnaq | 5 | Robbie Colgan | Matthew J Smith | 2:45.80 |
| 2020 | Barrington Court | 6 | Tom Madden | Jessica Harrington | 2:44.31 |
| 2021 | Jason The Militant | 7 | Billy Lee | Henry De Bromhead | 2:48.15 |
| 2022 | Duke De Sessa | 3 | Chris Hayes | Dermot Weld | 2:49.72 |
| 2023 | Vischio | 6 | Gary Carroll | Richard Donohue | 2:51.34 |
| 2024 | Hamish | 8 | Richard Kingscote | William Haggas | 2:38.34 |
| 2025 | Beset | 4 | Declan McDonogh | Joseph O'Brien | 2:43.82 |
| 2026 | Thread Of Gold | 3 | Billy Lee | Willie Mullins | 2:43.66 |

== See also ==
- Horse racing in Ireland
- List of Irish flat horse races
