= Sole Power Sprint Stakes =

Flat horse race in Ireland

Sole Power Sprint Stakes
2026
Bobby Mcgee	Victory Tip	Latin America

Previous years
2025
Bucanero Fuerte	Powerful Nation	Gutsy Girl
2024
Aesop's Fables	Twilight Jet	So Majestic
2023
Ladies Church	Moss Tucker	Lady Tilbury
2022
Brostaigh	Logo Hunter	Geocentric
2021
Logo Hunter	Back To Brussels	Romantic Proposal

2020-2017
2020
Make A Challenge	Rapid Reaction	Flash Gordon
2019
Soffia	Final Venture	Julia's Magic
2018
Ardhoomey	Gorane	Gymkhana
2017
Acapulco	Ardhoomey	Willytheconqueror

The Sole Power Sprint Stakes is a Listed flat horse race in Ireland open to thoroughbreds aged four years and older. It is run at the Curragh over a distance of 5 furlongs (1,006 metres), and it is scheduled to take place each year in May.

The race is named in tribute to the prolific Irish sprinter, Sole Power, and was first run in 2017.

== Records ==
Leading jockey (2 wins) :

- Ryan Moore – Aesop's Fables (2024), Mission Central (2026)

Leading trainer (3 wins):

- Aidan O'Brien – Acapulco (2017), Aesop's Fables (2024), Mission Central (2026)

== Winners ==
Year	Winner	Age	Jockey	Trainer	Time
2017	Acapulco	4	Donnacha O'Brien	Aidan O'Brien	1:00.33
2018	Ardhoomey	6	Colin Keane	Ger Lyons	1:04.27
2019	Soffia (Note: The 2019 race took place at Naas)	4	Declan McDonogh	Edward Lynam	0:58.17
2020	Make A Challenge (Note: The 2020 race took place at Naas in June due to the COVID-19 pandemic in the Republic of Ireland)	5	Joe Doyle	Denis Gerard Hogan	1:00.81
2021	Logo Hunter (Note: The 2021 race took place at Naas)	3	Seamie Heffernan	Michael Browne	1:00.02
2022	Brostaigh	3	Dylan Browne McMonagle	Joseph O'Brien	0:57.73
2023	Ladies Church (Note: The 2023 race took place at Naas)	4	Ben Coen	Johnny Murtagh	0:57.87
2024	Aesop's Fables	4	Ryan Moore	Aidan O'Brien	0:58.23
2025	Bucanero Fuerte (Note: The 2025 race took place at Naas)	4	David Egan	Adrian Murray	0:57.85
2026	Mission Central (Note: The 2026 race took place at Naas)	3	Ryan Moore	Aidan O'Brien	0:59:36

== See also ==
- Horse racing in Ireland
- List of Irish flat horse races
