= Abergwaun Stakes =

Flat horse race in Ireland

Abergwaun Stakes
2025
Grande Marques	Erosandpsyche	King Cuan

Previous years
2024
She's Quality	Jakajaro	Ano Syra
2023
Twilight Jet	Lokada	Dun Na Sead
2022
Tees Spirit	Erosandpsyche	Moss Tucker
2021
Master Matt	White Lavender	Urban Beat

2020-2011
2020
Make A Challenge	Urban Beat	Schroders Mistake
2019
Nitro Boost	Rapid Reaction	Urban Beat
2018
Blue Uluru	Hit The Bid	Different League
2017
Gorane	Snowstar	Ardhoomey
2016
Spirit Quartz	The Happy Prince	Ostatnia
2015
Monsieur Joe	Iffranesia	Dikta Del Mar
2014
Sir Maximilian	Abstraction	Russian Soul
2013
Russian Soul	Timeless Call	Abstraction
2012
Inxile	Nocturnal Affair	My Girl Anna
2011
Inxile	Move In Time	Invincible Ash

2010-2003
2010
Invincible Ash	Santo Padre	Luisant
2009
Perfect Polly	Snaefell	Aine
2008
Senor Benny	Aine	Hogmaneigh
2007
Senor Benny	City of Tribes	Benwilt Breeze
2006
Peace Offering	Osterhase	Miss Donovan
2005
Majestic Times	Cupids Ray	Pout
2004
Senor Benny	Moon Unit	Glocca Morra
2003
Anna Frid	Cool Cousin	Hanabad

The Abergwaun Stakes is a Listed flat horse race in Ireland open to thoroughbreds aged three years or older. It is run at Tipperary over a distance of 5 furlongs (1,006 metres), and it is scheduled to take place each year in August.

The race was first run in 2003.

== Records ==
Most successful horse (3 Wins):

- Senor Benny - (2004, 2007, 2008)

Leading jockey (3 wins):

- Declan McDonogh - Senor Benny (2004, 2008), Gorane (2017)
- Adrian Nicholls – Peace Offering (2006), Inxile (2011,2012)

Leading trainer (3 wins):

- Kevin McDonagh – Senor Benny (2004, 2007, 2008)
- David Nicholls - Peace Offering (2006), Inxile (2011,2012)

== Winners ==
Year	Winner	Age	Jockey	Trainer	Time
2003	Anna Frid	3	Pat Smullen	Dermot Weld	0:57.00
2004	Senor Benny	5	Declan McDonogh	Kevin McDonagh	1:01.50
2005	Majestic Times	5	Valdir DeSouza	Liam McAteer	1:01.40
2006	Peace Offering	6	Adrian Nicholls	David Nicholls	0:58.80
2007	Senor Benny	8	Declan McDonogh	Kevin McDonagh	0:58.66
2008	Senor Benny	9	Christopher Geoghegan	Kevin McDonagh	1:02.94
2009	Perfect Polly	4	Fran Berry	James M Ryan	0:59.86
2010	Invincible Ash	5	Gary Carroll	Michael Halford	0:56.55
2011	Inxile	6	Adrian Nicholls	David Nicholls	0:56.86
2012	Inxile	7	Adrian Nicholls	David Nicholls	1:02.84
2013	Russian Soul	5	Shane Foley	Michael Halford	0:57.55
2014	Sir Maximilian	5	Stevie Donohoe	Tim Pitt	0:56.50
2015	Monsieur Joe	8	Joseph O'Brien	Paul Midgley	0:57.58
2016	Spirit Quartz	8	Shane Foley	Robert Cowell	0:58.70
2017	Gorane	3	Declan McDonogh	Henry de Bromhead	0:58.65
2018	Blue Uluru	3	Colin Keane	Ger Lyons	0:58.36
2019	Nitro Boost	3	Billy Lee	Willie McCreery	0:57.77
2020	Make A Challenge (Note: The 2020 race was run at Navan after the original Tipperary fixture was abandoned due to waterlogging)	5	Joe Doyle	Denis Gerard Hogan	1:04.00
2021	Master Matt	5	Sam Ewing	Matthew Smith	0:57.21
2022	Tees Spirit	4	Barry McHugh	Adrian Nicholls	0:56.47
2023	Twilight Jet	4	Leigh Roche	Michael O'Callaghan	0:59.03
2024	She's Quality	3	Billy Lee	Jack Davison	0:57.89
2025	Grande Marques	3	Seamie Heffernan	Fozzy Stack	0:58.40
2026	Likedbymike	4	Colin Keane	Michael Byrne	0:58.97

== See also ==
- Horse racing in Ireland
- List of Irish flat horse races
