= Owenstown Stud Stakes =

Flat horse race in Ireland

Owenstown Stud Stakes
2026
Wannabe Royal	Expanded	Greek Mythology

Previous years
2025
Copacabana Sands	One Smack Mac	Mataariki
2024
Mutasarref	Special Wan	Tarawa
2023
Cosmic Vega	Sharlouk	New Energy
2022
Lust	Diadora	Laughifuwant
2021
Snapraeterea	Lustown Baba	Njord

2020-2011
2020
Bounce The Blues	Soul Search	Baraniya
2019
Surrounding	Chessman	King's Field
2018
Brother Bear	Riyazan	Sometimesadiamond
2017
Texas Rock	Drumfad Bay	Whitecliffsofdover
2016
Anamba	Hasanour	Sevenleft
2015
Heaven's Guest	Lat Hawill	Stay De Night
2014
Tested	Slipper Orchid	Ansgar
2013
Reply	Tobann	Parliament Square
2012
One Spirit	Gordon Lord Byron	Glor Na Mara
2011
Rose Bonheur	Blaze Brightly	Barack

The Owenstown Stud Stakes is a Listed flat horse race in Ireland open to thoroughbreds aged three years or older. It is run at Naas over a distance of 7 furlongs (1,408 metres), and it is scheduled to take place each year in May.

The race was first run in 2011.

== Records ==
Leading jockey (3 wins):

- Ronan Whlean - Surrounding (2019), Cosmic Vega (2023), Wannabe Royal (2026)

Leading trainer (3 wins): (includes joint wins)

- Michael Halford – Anamba (2016), Surrounding (2019), Cosmic Vega (2023)
- Ger Lyons - One Spirit (2012), Lust (2022), Mutasarref (2024)

== Winners ==
Year	Winner	Age	Jockey	Trainer	Time
2011	Rose Bonheur	3	Declan McDonogh	Kevin Prendergast	1:24.05
2012	One Spirit	4	Niall McCullagh	Ger Lyons	1:23.38
2013	Reply	4	Joseph O'Brien	Aidan O'Brien	1:22.65
2014	Tested	3	Pat Smullen	Dermot Weld	1:25.32
2015	Heaven's Guest	5	James Doyle	Richard Fahey	1:27.00
2016	Anamba	3	William Buick	Michael Halford	1:23.39
2017	Texas Rock	6	Billy Lee	Michael Grassick	1:25.21
2018	Brother Bear	3	Colm O'Donoghue	Jessica Harrington	1:27.50
2019	Surrounding	6	Ronan Whelan	Michael Halford	1:28.02
2020	Bounce The Blues (Note: The 2020 race was run in August due to the COVID-19 pandemic in the Republic of Ireland)	3	Kevin Manning	John James Feane	1:32.18
2021	Snapraeterea	3	Declan McDonogh	Joseph O'Brien	1:33.18
2022	Lust	4	Colin Keane	Ger Lyons	1:26.61
2023	Cosmic Vega	5	Ronan Whelan	Michael Halford & Tracey Collins	1:26.46
2024	Mutasarref	6	Colin Keane	Ger Lyons	1:26.01
2025	Copacabana Sands	3	Jamie Powell	Michael O'Callaghan	1:25.07
2026	Wannabe Royal	4	Ronan Whelan	Henry de Bromhead	1:29:12

== See also ==
- Horse racing in Ireland
- List of Irish flat horse races
