= Legacy Stakes =

Flat horse race in Ireland

Legacy Stakes
2026
Shimmering Sun	Controlla	Blooming Sally

Previous years
2025
Ipanema Queen	Sirius	Aegina
2024
Lady With The Lamp	Revoke	Powerful Nation
2023
Pipsy	Alabama	Ashwiyaa
2022
Funny Money Honey	Malrescia	Congo River
2021
Geocentric	Ladies Church	Loveday

2020-2017
2020
Frenetic	Giselles Thunder	Measure Of Magic
2019
Tango	Schroders Mistake	Silver Spear
2018
All The King's Men	Recon Mission	Eclipse Storm
2017
Gobi Desert	Golden Spell	Brick By Brick

The Legacy Stakes is a Listed flat horse race in Ireland open to thoroughbreds aged two years only. It is run at Dundalk over a distance of 5 furlongs (1,006 metres), and it is scheduled to take place each year in October.

The race was run for the first time in 2017. Prior to 2020 it was run at Navan over 5 furlongs and 164 yards.

== Records ==
Leading jockey (4 wins):

- Colin Keane – Gobi Desert (2017), Frenetic (2020), Geocentric (2021), Pipsy (2023)

Leading trainer (4 wins):

- Ger Lyons – Gobi Desert (2017), Frenetic (2020), Geocentric (2021), Pipsy (2023)

== Winners ==
Year	Winner	Jockey	Trainer	Time
2017	Gobi Desert	Colin Keane	Ger Lyons	1:16.81
2018	All the King's Men	Seamie Heffernan	Aidan O'Brien	1:12.69
2019	Tango	Donnacha O'Brien	Aidan O'Brien	1:17.40
2020	Frenetic	Colin Keane	Ger Lyons	0:58.24
2021	Geocentric	Colin Keane	Ger Lyons	0:59.13
2022	Funny Money Honey	Shane Foley	Jessica Harrington	0:59.36
2023	Pipsy	Colin Keane	Ger Lyons	0:59.34
2024	Lady With The Lamp	Declan McDonogh	Joseph O'Brien	0:59.60
2025	Ipanema Queen	David Egan	Adrian Murray	0:59.45
2026	Shimmering Sun	Ben Coen	Harry Eustace	0:59.48

== See also ==
- Horse racing in Ireland
- List of Irish flat horse races
