= Bluebell Stakes =

Flat horse race in Ireland

Bluebell Stakes
2026
Snapretend	Beset	Capichera

Previous years
2025
Fleur De Chine	Beset	Royal Entry
2024
Caught U Looking	Galileo Dame	Romzina
2023
Dancing Tango	Azazat	Perfect Portrait
2022
Yaxeni	Term Of Endearment	One For Bobby
2021
Thunder Kiss	Sweet Molly Malone	Barrington Court

2020-2015
2020
Barrington Court	Snapraeceps	Yaxeni
2019
Solage	Warnaq	Camphor
2018
Curly	Dynabee	Bongiorno
2017
Red Stars	Tilly's Chilli	Dew Line
2016
Toe The Line	Shall We	Sea Swift
2015
Endless Time	Almela	Toe The Line

The Bluebell Stakes is a Listed flat horse race in Ireland open to thoroughbred fillies and mares aged three years or older. It is run at Naas Racecourse over a distance of 1 mile and 4 furlongs (2,414 metres), and it is scheduled to take place each year in October.

The race was first run in 2015.

== Records ==
Leading jockey since 1994 (5 wins):

- Colin Keane – Toe The Line (2016), Thunder Kiss (2021), Yaxeni (2022), Caught U Looking (2024), Fleur De Chine (2025)

Leading trainer since 1994 (2 wins):

- Ger Lyons - Thunder Kiss (2021), Yaxeni (2022)
- Jessica Harrington - Barrington Court (2020), Fleur De Chine (2025)
- Joseph O'Brien - Dancing Tango (2023), Snapretend (2026)

== Winners ==
Year	Winner	Age	Jockey	Trainer	Time
2015	Endless Time	3	James Doyle	Charlie Appleby	2:32.23
2016	Toe The Line	7	Colin Keane	John Kiely	2:46.05
2017	Red Stars	4	Declan McDonogh	John Oxx	2:47.60
2018	Curly	3	Seamie Heffernan	Aidan O'Brien	2:34.57
2019	Solage	3	Kevin Manning	Jim Bolger	2:43.82
2020	Barrington Court	6	Shane Foley	Jessica Harrington	2:39.92
2021	Thunder Kiss	4	Colin Keane	Ger Lyons	2:39.64
2022	Yaxeni	5	Colin Keane	Ger Lyons	2:38.95
2023	Dancing Tango	4	Dylan Browne McMonagle	Joseph O'Brien	2:39.84
2024	Caught U Looking	3	Colin Keane	Noel Meade	2:32.19
2025	Fleur De Chine	4	Colin Keane	Jessica Harrington	2:34.57
2026	Snapretend	4	Jamie Powell	Joseph O'Brien	2:38.01

== See also ==
- Horse racing in Ireland
- List of Irish flat horse races
