= Trigo Stakes =

Flat horse race in Ireland

Trigo Stakes
2026
Come What May	Diego El Queso	Snellen

Previous years
2025
Shaool	Acapulco Bay	Certain Lad
2024
Elizabeth Jane	Layfayette	Stromberg
2023
Boogie Woogie	Sunchart	Hannibal Barca
2022
Self Belief	Kerkiyra	Lyrical Poetry
2021
Georgeville	Wuqood	Leo De Fury

2020-2011
2020
Amma Grace	Numerian	Elizabethofaragon
2019
Mount Everest	Ancient Spirit	Riven Light
2018
Flavius	Flight Risk	Success Days
2017
Bound	Cannonball	Play The Game
2016
Flying Fairies	Zawraq	Round Two
2015
Zannda	Torcedor	Princess Aloof
2014
Answered	Vote Often	Ebasani
2013
Euphrasia	Tarana	Love And Cherish
2012
Famous Name	Demurely	An Saincheann
2011
Zaminast	Defining Year	Amazing Beauty

2010-2001
2010
Famous Name	Devoted To You	Choose Me
2009
Raise Your Heart	Distant Memories	Windsor Palace
2008
Famous Name	Poet	Varsity
2007
Ezima	Lord Admiral	Mooretown Lady
2006
Arch Rebel	Bon Nuit	Galatee
2005
Briolette	Gift Range	Power Elite
2004
Cairdeas	Zarafsha	Arch Rebel
2003
Livadiya	Royal Devotion	Pepperwood
2002
Ice Dancer	In Time's Eye	Marionnaud
2001
Ice Dancer	Taraza	Jammaal

2000-1995
2000
Jammaal	Golovin	Tarwila
1999
Strategic	Scottish Memories	My Lass
1998
Golden Rule	Catch The Dragon	Free To Speak
1997
Stage Affair	Tertia	Perfect Venue
1996
Asmara	I'm Supposin	Oriane
1995
Hasainiya	Taglioni	Double On

The Trigo Stakes is a Listed flat horse race in Ireland open to thoroughbreds aged three years or older. It is run at Leopardstown over a distance of 1 mile and 2 furlongs (2,012 metres), and it is scheduled to take place each year in October.

The race was run for the first time in 1995.

== Records ==
Most successful horse (3 wins):

- Famous Name – 2008, 2010, 2012

Leading jockey (8 wins):

- Pat Smullen – Asmara (1996), Jammaal (2000), Cairdeas (2004), Famous Name (2008,2010,2012), Zaminast (2011), Zannda (2015)

Leading trainer (10 wins):

- Dermot Weld – Stage Affair (1997), Jammaal (2000), Cairdeas (2004), Famous Name (2008,2010,2012), Zaminast (2011), Zannda (2015), Flavius (2018), Amma Grace (2020), Elizabeth Jane (2024)

== Winners ==
Year	Winner	Age	Jockey	Trainer	Time
1995	Hasainiya	3	Johnny Murtagh	John Oxx	2:04.90
1996	Asmara	3	Pat Smullen	John Oxx	2:14.80
1997	Stage Affair	3	Michael Kinane	Dermot Weld	2:07.90
1998	Golden Rule	3	Stephen Craine	Frances Crowley	2:25.20
1999	Strategic	3	Frankie Dettori	John Oxx	2:12.30
2000	Jammaal	3	Pat Smullen	Dermot Weld	2:23.20
2001	Ice Dancer	3	Paul Scallan	Aidan O'Brien	2:12.50
2002	Ice Dancer	4	Michael Kinane	Aidan O'Brien	2:06.00
2003	Livadiya	7	Michael Kinane	Harry Rogers	2:04.90
2004	Cairdeas	3	Pat Smullen	Dermot Weld	2:13.70
2005	Briolette	3	Kieren Fallon	Aidan O'Brien	2:24.30
2006	Arch Rebel	5	Johnny Murtagh	Noel Meade	2:15.50
2007	Ezima	3	Kevin Manning	Jim Bolger	2:04.98
2008	Famous Name	3	Pat Smullen	Dermot Weld	2:16.06
2009	Raise Your Heart	6	Kevin Manning	Joanna Morgan	2:08.07
2010	Famous Name	5	Pat Smullen	Dermot Weld	2:05.03
2011	Zaminast	3	Pat Smullen	Dermot Weld	2:08.22
2012	Famous Name	7	Pat Smullen	Dermot Weld	2:15.45
2013	Euphrasia	4	Gary Carroll	Joseph G Murphy	2:14.68
2014	Answered	3	Kevin Manning	Jim Bolger	2:07.59
2015	Zannda	3	Pat Smullen	Dermot Weld	2:12.37
2016	Flying Fairies	3	Gary Carroll	Joseph G Murphy	2:15.11
2017	Bound	4	Seamie Heffernan	Aidan O'Brien	2:18.72
2018	Flavius	3	Declan McDonogh	Dermot Weld	2:09.30
2019	Mount Everest	3	Wayne Lordan	Aidan O'Brien	2:20.90
2020	Amma Grace	3	Oisin Orr	Dermot Weld	2:16.91
2021	Georgeville	5	Colin Keane	Ger Lyons	2:07.75
2021	Georgeville	5	Colin Keane	Ger Lyons	2:07.75
2022	Self Belief	3	Nathan Crosse	Willie McCreery	2:12.86
2023	Boogie Woogie	3	Seamie Heffernan	Aidan O'Brien	2:16.81
2024	Elizabeth Jane	3	Chris Hayes	Dermot Weld	2:14.92
2025	Shaool	4	Ben Coen	Johnny Murtagh	2:16.50
2026	Come What May	3	Wayne Lordan	Aidan O'Brien	2:09.40

== See also ==
- Horse racing in Ireland
- List of Irish flat horse races
