= Phoenix Sprint Stakes =

Flat horse race in Ireland

- Class: Group 3
- Location: Curragh Racecourse; County Kildare, Ireland
- Race type: Flat / Thoroughbred
- Sponsor: Rathasker Stud
- Website: Curragh

Race information
- Distance: 6f (1,207 metres)
- Surface: Turf
- Track: Straight
- Qualification: Three-years-old and up
- Weight: 9 st 3 lb (3yo); 9 st 7 lb (4yo+); Allowances; 3 lb for fillies and mares Penalties; 7 lb for Group 1 winners * 5 lb for Group 2 winners * 5 lb if two Group 3 wins * 3 lb if one Group 3 win * * since 1 January
- Purse: €55,000 (2022); 1st: €32,450

Phoenix Sprint Stakes
2026
Big Mojo	Bucanero Fuerte	James's Delight

Previous years
2025
Bucanero Fuerte	My Mate Alfie	Kind Of Blue
2024
Givemethebeatboys	Kind Of Blue	My Mate Alfie
2023
Moss Tucker	Go Athletico	Ano Syra
2022
Go Bears Go	Ano Syra	Sacred Bridge
2021
Gustavus Weston	Power Under Me	A Case Of You

2020-2011
2020
Glen Shiel	Sonaiyla	Forever In Dreams
2019
Gustavus Weston	Woody Creek	Gordon Lord Byron
2017
Washington Dc	Cougar Mountain	Gordon Lord Byron
2016
Toscanini	Eastern Impact	Lord Of The Land
2015
Mattmu	Toscanini	Fort Del Oro
2014
Scream Blue Murder	Jamesie	Hamza
2013
Slade Power	Hamza	Sea Siren
2012
Fire Lily	Gordon Lord Byron	Definightly
2011
Deacon Blues	Empowering	Arctic

2010-2001
2010
Snaefell	Luisant	Bewitched
2009
Girouette	Perfect Polly	Icelandic
2008
Snaefell	Georgebernardshaw	Kyniska
2007
Al Qasi	Evening Time	Grecian Dancer
2006
Moss Vale	Red Clubs	Pivotal Point
2005
Osterhase	Balmont	Chookie Heiton
2004
One Cool Cat	The Kiddykid	Nights Cross
2003
Bonus	Sun Slash	Anna Frid
2002
One Won One	Bahamian Pirate	Final Exam
2001
Bahamian Pirate	One Won One	Munjiz

2000-1991
2000
Eastern Purple	Conormara	One Won One
1999
Gorse	Grazia	Eastern Purple
1998
March Star	Bianconi	Monaassib
1997
Cretan Gift	Azizzi	Ailleacht
1996
Daring Destiny	Farhana	Leap For Joy
1994
Surprise Offer	Piccolo	Nimphidia
1993
Tropical	Montendre	Midhish
1992
Park Dream	Poolesta	Street Rebel
1991
Amigo Menor	Inishdalla	Brentsville

1990-1988
1990
Northern Goddess	Case Law	Tod
1989
Point Of Light	Corwyn Bay	Nabeel Dancer
1988
Ingabelle	Welsh Charm	La Meilleure

The Phoenix Sprint Stakes is a Group 3 flat horse race in Ireland open to thoroughbreds aged three years or older. It is run at the Curragh over a distance of 6 furlongs (1,207 metres), and it is scheduled to take place each year in August.

The event was formerly held at Phoenix Park, and for a period it was known as the Matt Gallagher Sprint Stakes. It was staged at the Curragh in 1982, and it returned to its usual venue the following year. The race was transferred to Leopardstown in 1991.

The Phoenix Sprint Stakes began its present spell at the Curragh in 2002. It was temporarily switched to Leopardstown in 2008, as the planned running at the Curragh was abandoned due to waterlogging.

== Records ==
Most successful horse since 1978 (2 wins):

- Acushla – 1986, 1987
- Gustavus Weston – 2019, 2021
- Snaefell – 2008, 2010

Leading jockey since 1978 (3 wins):

- Michael Kinane – Jester (1983), Northern Goddess (1990), Tropical (1993)

Leading trainer since 1978 (3 wins):

- Michael Halford – Snaefell (2008, 2010), Toscanini (2016)

== Winners since 1978 ==
Yeari	Winner	Age	Jockey	Trainer	Time
1978	Ballad Rock	4	George McGrath	Seamus McGrath	1:09.10
1979	Miami Springs	3	Tony Murray	Mick O'Toole	1:07.80
1980	God's Mark	4	Dermot Hogan	Christy Grassick	1:10.50
1981	Runnett	4	Wally Swinburn	John Dunlop	1:10.90
1982	Bruckner	3	Pat Shanahan	Con Collins	1:13.10
1983	Jester	4	Michael Kinane	Tony Redmond	1:11.50
1984	Princess Tracy	3	Raymond Carroll	Michael Cunningham	1:07.50
1985	Rangoon Ruby (Note: Double Schwartz finished first in 1985, but he was disqualified)	3	Kevin Moses	Noel Meade	1:10.10
1986	Acushla	3	Cash Asmussen	Vincent O'Brien	1:09.20
1987	Acushla	4	Cash Asmussen	Vincent O'Brien	1:11.30
1988	Ingabelle	4	Donal Manning	Tom Lacy	1:11.30
1989	Point of Light	4	John Reid	Geoff Lewis	1:11.10
1990	Northern Goddess	3	Michael Kinane	Ian Balding	1:10.10
1991	Amigo Menor	5	Chris Rutter	David Murray Smith	1:13.20
1992	Park Dream	3	Christy Roche	Jim Bolger	1:13.30
1993	Tropical	3	Michael Kinane	Dermot Weld	1:12.80
1994	Surprise Offer	4	Walter Swinburn	Richard Hannon Sr.	1:13.00
1995	Desert Style	3	Kevin Manning	Jim Bolger	1:14.00
1996	Daring Destiny	5	Richard Hughes	Karl Burke	1:13.50
1997	Cretan Gift	6	Jason Weaver	Nick Littmoden	1:12.20
1998	March Star	4	Pat Eddery	James Toller	1:10.20
1999	Gorse	4	Gary Carter	Henry Candy	1:15.20
2000	Eastern Purple	5	Basil Marcus	Kevin Ryan	1:12.50
2001	Bahamian Pirate	6	Johnny Murtagh	David Nicholls	1:13.50
2002	One Won One	8	Seamie Heffernan	Joanna Morgan	1:14.80
2003	Bonus	3	Richard Hughes	Richard Hannon Sr.	1:12.40
2004	One Cool Cat	3	Jamie Spencer	Aidan O'Brien	1:12.70
2005	Osterhase	6	Fran Berry	John Mulhern	1:13.20
2006	Moss Vale	5	Kieren Fallon	David Nicholls	1:11.00
2007	Al Qasi	4	Kerrin McEvoy	Peter Chapple-Hyam	1:17.39
2008	Snaefell	4	Rory Cleary	Michael Halford	1:18.25
2009	Girouette	4	Pat Shanahan	Tracey Collins	1:15.28
2010	Snaefell	6	Shane Foley	Michael Halford	1:10.80
2011	Deacon Blues	4	Johnny Murtagh	James Fanshawe	1:10.60
2012	Fire Lily	3	Wayne Lordan	David Wachman	1:17.54
2013	Slade Power	4	Wayne Lordan	Edward Lynam	1:09.33
2014	Scream Blue Murder	4	Pat Smullen	Tommy Stack	1:13.61
2015	Mattmu	3	David Allan	Tim Easterby	1:10.62
2016	Toscanini	4	James Doyle	Michael Halford	1:10.17
2017	Washington DC	4	Ryan Moore	Aidan O'Brien	1:11.77
2018	Speak In Colours	3	Donnacha O'Brien	Joseph O'Brien	1:10.63
2019	Gustavus Weston	3	Gary Carroll	Joseph G. Murphy	1:15.42
2020	Glen Shiel	6	Oisin Orr	Archie Watson	1:12.69
2021	Gustavus Weston	5	Gary Carroll	Joseph G. Murphy	1:11.64
2022	Go Bears Go	3	Rossa Ryan	David Loughnane	1:11.28
2023	Moss Tucker	5	Billy Lee	Ken Condon	1:11.91
2024	Givemethebeatboys	3	Shane Foley	Jessica Harrington	1:09.16
2025	Bucanero Fuerte	4	David Egan	Adrian Murray	1:08.91
2026	Big Mojo	4	Tom Marquand	Michael Appleby	1:09.36

== See also ==
- Horse racing in Ireland
- List of Irish flat horse races
