= Sweet Mimosa Stakes =

Flat horse race in Ireland

- Class: Listed
- Location: Naas Racecourse; County Kildare, Ireland
- Inaugurated: 2003
- Race type: Flat / Thoroughbred
- Sponsor: Yeomanstown Stud
- Website: Naas

Race information
- Distance: 6f (1,207 metres)
- Surface: Turf
- Track: Straight
- Qualification: Three-years-old and up fillies and mares
- Weight: 9 st 0 lb (3yo); 9 st 5 lb (4yo+); Penalties; 7 lb for Group 1 or 2 winners * 5 lb for Group 3 winners* 3 lb for Listed winners* * since 1 August 2018
- Purse: €47,000 (2022); 1st: €29,500

Sweet Mimosa Stakes
2026
Soul Love	Dancing Saxon	Fregada

Previous years
2025
Sky Majesty	Carla Ridge	Bellaphina
2024
Nighteyes	Over The Blues	Letherfly
2023
Clounmacon	Aussie Girl	My Eyes Adore You
2022
Pirate Jenny	Sablonne	Sacred Bridge
2021
Wren's Breath	More Beautiful	Teresa Mendoza

2020-2011
2020
Sonaiyla	Back To Brussels	Pronouncement
2019
Servalan	Woody Creek	Gold Filigree
2018
Sometimesadiamond	Could It Be Love	Golden Spell
2017
Only Mine	Music Box	Rehana
2016
Fort Del Oro	Buying Trouble	Most Beautiful
2015
Letters Of Note	Byzantium	Newsletter
2014
Minalisa	Tobann	Gathering Power
2013
Miss Lahar	Minalisa	Boston Rocker
2012
Empowering	Caprella	After
2011
Katla	Empowering	Alanza

2010-2003
2010
Bewitched	Swiss Diva	Prescription
2009
Girouette	Perfect Polly	What's Up Pussycat
2008
Elletelle	Aleagueoftheirown	Akua'Ba
2007
Evening Time	Lidanski	Cuilaphuca
2006
Indian Maiden	Beauty Bright	That's Hot
2005
Shersha	Alexander Icequeen	Miss Sally
2004
Ulfah	Shersha	Ruby Rocket
2003
Daganya	Anna Frid	Bon Expresso

The Sweet Mimosa Stakes is a Listed flat horse race in Ireland open to fillies and mares aged three years and over. It is run at Naas over a distance of 6 furlongs (1,206 metres), and it is scheduled to take place each year in July.

The race was first run in 2003. It was run at Leopardstown until 2007, and at the Curragh in 2008 and 2009. It is currently sponsored by the Yeomanstown Stud.

== Records ==
Leading jockey (3 wins):

- Johnny Murtagh – Elletelle (2008), Bewitched (2010), Miss Lahar (2013)
- Billy Lee – Katia (2011), Fort Del Oro (2016), Sonaiyla (2020)
- Gary Carroll - Only Mine (2017), Wren's Breath (2021), Pirate Jenny (2022)

Leading trainer (2 wins):

- Kevin Prendergast – Ulfah (2004), Evening Time (2007)
- Ger Lyons - Elletelle (2008), Pirate Jenny (2022)

== Winners ==
Year	Winner	Age	Jockey	Trainer	Time
2003	Daganya	3	Tadhg O'Shea	Michael Halford	1:12.70
2004	Ulfah	3	Declan McDonogh	Kevin Prendergast	1:13.60
2005	Shersha	6	Kevin Manning	Sean Treacy	1:13.00
2006	Indian Maiden	6	Fran Berry	Malcolm Saunders	1:15.86
2007	Evening Time	3	Declan McDonogh	Kevin Prendergast	1:14.10
2008	Elletelle	3	Johnny Murtagh	Ger Lyons	1:12.23
2009	Girouette	4	Pat Shanahan	Tracey Collins	1:19.08
2010	Bewitched	3	Johnny Murtagh	Charles O'Brien	1:10.82
2011	Katla	3	Billy Lee	John Grogan	1:08.76
2012	Empowering	4	Joseph O'Brien	Aidan O'Brien	1:14.10
2013	Miss Lahar	4	Johnny Murtagh	Mick Channon	1:10.81
2014	Minalisa	5	Fran Berry	Rae Guest	1:08.03
2015	Letters Of Note	3	Pat Smullen	Michael O'Callaghan	1:10.93
2016	Fort Del Oro	4	Billy Lee	Edward Lynam	1:10.58
2017	Only Mine	4	Gary Carroll	Joseph G. Murphy	1:11.14
2018	Sometimesadiamond	3	Kevin Manning	Jim Bolger	1:11.14
2019	Servalan	3	Shane Foley	Jessica Harrington	1:11.98
2020	Sonaiyla (Note: The 2020 race was run at Cork due to the COVID-19 pandemic in the Republic of Ireland)	3	Billy Lee	Paddy Twomey	1:09.69
2021	Wren's Breath	3	Gary Carroll	Henry de Bromhead	1:10.68
2022	Pirate Jenny	3	Gary Carroll	Ger Lyons	1:11.41
2023	Clounmacon	3	Shane Foley	Johnny Murtagh	1:13.92
2024	Nighteyes	3	Daniel Tudhope	David O'Meara	1:14.06
2025	Sky Majesty	3	Tom Marquand	William Haggas	1:10.99
2026	Soul Love	3	Pierre-Louis Jamin	Karl Burke	1:08.28

== See also ==
- Horse racing in Ireland
- List of Irish flat horse races
