= Glen Shiel (horse) =

British-bred Thoroughbred racehorse

- Sire: Pivotal
- Grandsire: Polar Falcon
- Dam: Gonfilia
- Damsire: Big Shuffle
- Sex: Gelding
- Foaled: 7 May 2014 (age 12)
- Country: United Kingdom
- Colour: Chestnut
- Breeder: Darley Stud
- Owner: Godolphin; Hambleton Racing XXXVI
- Trainer: Andre Fabre; Archie Watson
- Record: 37: 8-10-1
- Earnings: £731,229

Major wins
- Prix Le Fabuleux (2017); Phoenix Sprint Stakes (2020); British Champions Sprint Stakes (2020)

Glen Shiel (foaled 7 May 2014) is a British-bred Thoroughbred former racehorse. He began his racing career where he showed useful but unremarkable form in his first two seasons, recording his best win in the Listed Prix Le Fabuleux in October 2017. He was gelded but his form deteriorated in 2018 and a transfer to race in England in the following year brought little improvement. After being previously campaigned over middle distances he was dropped back in trip in 2020 and emerged as a top-class sprinter, winning five races including the Phoenix Sprint Stakes and the British Champions Sprint Stakes.

== Background ==
Glen Shiel is a chestnut horse with a white star bred in England by Sheikh Mohammed's Darley Stud. He was initially sent into training in France with Andre Fabre and raced in the blue colours of Godolphin.

He was from the seventeenth crop of foals sired by Pivotal, a top class sprinter who won the King's Stand Stakes and the Nunthorpe Stakes in 1996. He went on to become a very successful breeding stallion, getting the winners of more than a thousand races across a range of distances including Sariska, Somnus, Farhh, Addeybb, Kyllachy and Immortal Verse. Glen Shiel's dam Gonfilia was a high-class German-bred racemare whose seven wins included the Balanchine and the Princess Elizabeth Stakes. She was a grand-daughter of the German 1,000 Guineas winner Grimpola, whose other descendants have included Farhh, Legatissimo and Fame and Glory.

== Racing career ==
=== 2016 & 2017: two- and three-year-old seasons ===
On his racecourse debut, Glen Shiel started the 1.1/1 favourite for a maiden race over 1500 metres on heavy ground at Saint-Cloud Racecourse. Ridden by Pierre-Charles Boudot he tracked the leaders before taking the lead 400 metres from the finish and won by one and three quarter lengths from the filly Vue Fantastique.

On his first run as a three-year-old Glen Shiel ran fourth in a minor race over 1600 metres at Maisons-Laffitte Racecourse on 18 April. He then started odds-on favourite for the Prix Pimpin at over the same distance at Lyon on 11 May and won "cosily" by two lengths from Rip. He was moved up to Listed class for his four remaining races in 2017. He was beaten a head by Afandem in the Prix Ridgway over 2000 metres at Compiegne in June, sixth to Farshad when favourite for the Prix de Tourgeville over 1600 metres at Deauville Racecourse on 1 August and fourth to Bay of Poets in the Prix Pelleas over 1800 metres at Deauville-Clairefontaine Racecourse seventeen days later. On his final appearance of the season Glen Shiel started at odds of 11.2/1 in a six-runner field for the 1800 metres Prix Le Fabuleux at Chantilly Racecourse on 7 October. Ridden by Maxime Guyon he settled in second place behind D'bai before taking the lead 300 metres from the finish and held on in the closing stages to win by a head from Cheerful Star.

=== 2018: four-year-old season ===
Glen Shiel was gelded before the start of the 2018 season. He was ridden in all four of his races that year by Mickael Barzalona. After running second to Noor Al Hawa in the Grand Prix de Compiegne over 2000 metres on 23 June he was stepped up to Group 3 class for the Grand Prix de Vichy in the following month and started favourite but finished unplaced behind the same opponent. He was dropped in class for the Prix du Defi du Galop at Clairefontaine in August and came home fifth behind the German seven-year-old Potemkin. He ended the year on 18 November when he contested the Grand Prix de la Ville de Marcq-en-Baroeul over 1800 metres on heavy ground at Le Croisé Laroche racecourse, near Lille. He took the lead in the straight but was overtaken on the line and beaten a nose by Liljan.

=== 2019: five-year-old season ===
In May 2019 Glen Shiel was consigned to the Goffs Spring Horses In Training sale and was bought for £45,000 by Blandford Bloodstock. He entered the ownership of the Hambleton Racing syndicate and joined the training stable of Archie Watson at Upper Lambourn in Berkshire. He was ridden in most of his subsequent races by Hollie Doyle. The gelding made his British debut by coming home fifth in a handicap race over ten furlongs on the synthetic Polytrack surface at Chelmsford City Racecourse on 4 September. He then ran second in a handicap at Goodwood Racecourse in later that month and fourth in a similar race at Ascot Racecourse in October before returning to France to finish ninth in his second attempt to win the Grand Prix de la Ville de Marcq-en-Baroeul. Glen Shiel ended an unsuccessful campaign by coming home eighth in a ten-furlong handicap on the Polytrack at Lingfield Park on 4 December.

=== 2020: six-year-old season ===
Glen Shiel began his 2020 campaign on 8 January in a minor handicap over seven furlongs (the shortest distance over which he had ever raced) on the Tapeta at Newcastle Racecourse and started at odds of 4/1 in a nine-runner field. Carrying 137 pounds he took the lead just after half way and recorded his first victory in well over two years as kept on well to win by one and a quarter lengths from Rathbone. In February he contested a similar event over the same course and distance but after leading for most of the way he was overtaken in the closing stages and came home third behind Sanaadh and Rathbone, beaten a neck and half a length. In the Listed Lady Wulfruna Stakes on Tapeta at Wolverhampton Racecourse on 7 March he made little impact as he finished seventh of the ten runners. In late March horse racing in England was suspended owing to the COVID-19 pandemic.

Racing resumed behind closed doors on 1 June and on the second day of the resumption Glen Shiel ran second to Mubakker in a six-furlong handicap at Newcastle. Two weeks later he ran on turf for the first time that year when he contested the Buckingham Palace Handicap over seven furlongs at Royal Ascot but after being in contention for most of the way he faded badly and finished unplaced Motakhayyel. Thirteen days after his run at Ascot the gelding returned to the Tapeta at Newcastle for a six-furlong handicap and led from the start to win "comfortably" by two lengths and a neck from Tabdeed and Rathbone. On 12 July he was sent to France for the Group 3 Prix de Ris-Orangis over 1200 metres on turf at Deauville when he went to the front at half way before being headed 200 metres from the finish and was beaten one and a quarter lengths by the three-year-old Royal Crusade. He was back on Newcastle's Tapeta track on 2 August when he was ridden by Paul Mulrennan and won a minor six-furlong event by two and a quarter length after disputing the lead for most of the way. A week after his latest win at Newcastle Glen Shiel was sent to Ireland and was ridden by Oisin Orr as he contested the Group 3 Phoenix Sprint Stakes over six furlongs at the Curragh. He went off the 12/1 fourth choice behind Millisle, Speak In Colours (Greenlands Stakes) and Sonaiyla (Sweet Mimosa Stakes) in a nine-runner field. After settling in fourth place he kept on strongly in the closing stages, gained the advantage approaching the finishing line and won in a four-way "blanket finish" from Sonaiyla, Forever In Dreams and Speak In Colours. After the race Orr commented "He's very tough. Ideally I didn't want to be in behind them but when I did get him out and got him rolling he came home well. He stays a bit further and when I got him out and in the clear he hit the hill well.

On 5 September Glen Shiel was stepped up to Group 1 class for the first time and started at odds of 12/1 in a thirteen-runner field for the Betfair Sprint Cup Stakes over six furlongs on soft ground at Haydock Park. With Doyle in the saddle, he raced up the near side (the right side of the course from the jockey's viewpoint), made a strong challenge approaching the final furlong and finished second to Dream of Dreams, beaten just over a length by the winner. The British Champions Sprint Stakes over six furlongs at Ascot on 17 October attracted a field of sixteen sprinters including Dream of Dreams, One Master, Oxted, The Tin Man, Brando (Prix Maurice de Gheest), Speak In Colours, Sonaiyla, Art Power (Lacken Stakes), Happy Power (Challenge Stakes) and Lope Y Fernandez (Round Tower Stakes) and Glen Shiel went off a 16/1 outsider. Glen Shiel started well and set the pace down the centre of the track before giving way to Oxted approaching the final furlong. He rallied strongly in the closing stages, regained the advantage and held on to win by a nose from Brando, with One Master, Art Power and Oxted finishing close behind. Doyle, who became the third female jockey after Alex Greaves and Hayley Turner to win a Group 1 in England commented "It was too close for comfort really. I thought I hadn't won, so to have had the result we have was incredible. Me and Oxted had a good old battle from the three pole and I thought that I would be doing well to hold on like I did but he is such a game horse. He's incredible. He has got quicker with age. When we first got him, he was running over 10 furlongs in France and didn't show a whole lot of speed but the further we dropped him back, the quicker he got."

=== 2021: seven-year-old season ===
Glen Shiel did not achieve any victories during the 2021 season. In his first race of the season he came fourth in the Greenlands Stakes at the Curragh. He was then beaten a length into second place by Dream of Dreams in the Diamond Jubilee Stakes at Ascot. He finished unplaced in his next four races and finished the season with second place in the British Champions Sprint Stakes at Ascot, beaten one length by Creative Force.

=== 2022: eight-year-old season ===
Glen Shiel started the season with a second place at Haydock, before again finishing fourth in the Greenlands Stakes at the Curragh and eighth in the Chipchase Stakes at Newcastle. On 11 August 2022 Glen Shiel's owners confirmed his retirement.

== Pedigree ==
Pedigree of Glen Shiel (GB), chestnut gelding, 2014
Sire Pivotal (GB) 1993	Polar Falcon (USA); 1987	Nureyev	Northern Dancer (CAN)
Sire Pivotal (GB) 1993	Polar Falcon (USA); 1987	Nureyev	Special
Sire Pivotal (GB) 1993	Polar Falcon (USA); 1987	Marie d'Argonne (FR)	Jefferson (GB)
Sire Pivotal (GB) 1993	Polar Falcon (USA); 1987	Marie d'Argonne (FR)	Mohair
Sire Pivotal (GB) 1993	Fearless Revival; 1987	Cozzene (USA)	Caro (IRE)
Sire Pivotal (GB) 1993	Fearless Revival; 1987	Cozzene (USA)	Ride The Trails
Sire Pivotal (GB) 1993	Fearless Revival; 1987	Stufida	Bustino
Sire Pivotal (GB) 1993	Fearless Revival; 1987	Stufida	Zerbinetta
Dam Gonfilia (GER) 2000	Big Shuffle (USA); 1984	Super Concorde	Bold Reasoning
Dam Gonfilia (GER) 2000	Big Shuffle (USA); 1984	Super Concorde	Prime Abord (GB)
Dam Gonfilia (GER) 2000	Big Shuffle (USA); 1984	Raise Your Skirts	Elevation
Dam Gonfilia (GER) 2000	Big Shuffle (USA); 1984	Raise Your Skirts	Strings Attached
Dam Gonfilia (GER) 2000	Gonfalon (GB); 1989	Slip Anchor	Shirley Heights
Dam Gonfilia (GER) 2000	Gonfalon (GB); 1989	Slip Anchor	Sayonara (GER)
Dam Gonfilia (GER) 2000	Gonfalon (GB); 1989	Grimpola (GER)	Windwurf
Dam Gonfilia (GER) 2000	Gonfalon (GB); 1989	Grimpola (GER)	Gondel (Family: 1-i)
