= Hurry Harriet Stakes =

Flat horse race in Ireland

Hurry Harriet Stakes
2026
Star Performer	Hollys Graces	Classiest

Previous years
2025
Naomi Lapaglia	Madam Celeste	Tarima
2024
Wingspan	One Look	Unreasonable
2023
Unless	Azazat	Alanya
2022
Paris Peacock	Didn'thavemuchtodo	Show Of Stars
2021
Solene Lilyette	Astadash	Emaniya

2020-2011
2020
Laburnum	Ennistymon	A New Dawn
2019
Goddess	Tipitena	Who's Steph
2018
Snowy Winter	Hence	Dynabee
2016
Adool	Santa Monica	Assume
2015
Easter	Stellar Glow	My Titania
2014
Carla Bianca	Alive Alive Oh	Beyond Brilliance
2013
Along Came Casey	Belle de Crecy	Say
2012
Twirl	Soon	Midnight Music
2011
Bible Belt	Hurricane Havoc	Sapphire

2010-2007
2010
Duchess Of Foxland	Fourpenny Lane	Barring Decree
2009
Chinese White	Roman Empress	She's Our Mark
2008
Katiyra	She's Our Mark	Mystical Lady
2007
Baby Blue Eyes	Magic Carpet	Arkadina

The Hurry Harriet Stakes is a Listed flat horse race in Ireland open to thoroughbred fillies and mares aged three years or older. It is run at Gowran Park over a distance of 1 mile, 1 furlong and 100 yards (1,902 metres), and it is scheduled to take place each year in August.

The race was first run in 2007.

== Records ==
Leading jockey (4 wins):

- Pat Smullen – Chinese White (2009), Along Came Casey (2013), Carla Bianca (2014), Adool (2016)

Leading trainer (7 wins):

- Aidan O'Brien – Twirl (2012), Easter (2015), Alluringly (2017), Goddess (2019), Laburnum (2020), Unless (2023), Wingspan (2024)

== Winners ==
Year	Winner	Age	Jockey	Trainer	Time
2007	Baby Blue Eyes	4	Danny Grant	Patrick J. Flynn	1:57.08
2008	Katiyra	3	Michael Kinane	John Oxx	2:06.98
2009	Chinese White	4	Pat Smullen	Dermot Weld	2:01.16
2010	Duchess Of Foxland	3	Emmet McNamara	Mark L Fagan	2:00.36
2011	Bible Belt	3	Shane Foley	Jessica Harrington	1:57.01
2012	Twirl	3	Colm O'Donoghue	Aidan O'Brien	2:05.01
2013	Along Came Casey	5	Pat Smullen	Dermot Weld	1:59.72
2014	Carla Bianca	3	Pat Smullen	Dermot Weld	2:01.11
2015	Easter	3	Seamie Heffernan	Aidan O'Brien	2:01.79
2016	Adool	3	Pat Smullen	Dermot Weld	2:00.38
2017	Alluringly	3	Seamie Heffernan	Aidan O'Brien	2:07.79
2018	Snowy Winter	4	Gary Carroll	Archie Watson	1:58.33
2019	Goddess	3	Donnacha O'Brien	Aidan O'Brien	2:05.06
2020	Laburnum	3	Seamie Heffernan	Aidan O'Brien	1:59.34
2021	Solene Lilyette	4	Andrew Slattery	Andrew Slattery	2:01.03
2022	Paris Peacock	3	Shane Foley	Jessica Harrington	1:59.25
2023	Unless (Note: The 2023 running took place at The Curragh)	3	Gary Carroll	Aidan O'Brien	2:10.79
2024	Wingspan	3	Wayne Lordan	Aidan O'Brien	1:58.94
2025	Naomi Lapaglia	5	James Ryan	Ger Lyons	1:58.10

== See also ==
- Horse racing in Ireland
- List of Irish flat horse races
