= List of Irish flat horse races =

Listed of Irish Flat races

A list of notable flat horse races that take place annually in Ireland, under the authority of Horse Racing Ireland. This list includes all conditions races which currently hold Group 1, 2, 3 or Listed status in the European Pattern programme. Race distances are expressed in miles and furlongs.

The races in bold are run on an all-weather surface, and horses' names which are in italics won that race in the previous season.

== Group 1 ==
Month	Race Name	Racecourse	Distance	Age/Sex	2026 winner
May	Irish 2,000 Guineas	Curragh	1m	3yo c&f	Gstaad
May	Tattersalls Gold Cup	Curragh	1m 2½f	4yo+	Almaqam
May	Irish 1,000 Guineas	Curragh	1m	3yo f	Precise
June	Pretty Polly Stakes	Curragh	1m 2f	3yo+ f	Estrange
June	Irish Derby	Curragh	1m 4f	3yo c&f	Benvenuto Cellini
July	Irish Oaks	Curragh	1m 4f	3yo f	Johanna Walsh
August	Phoenix Stakes	Curragh	6f	2yo c&f	Sun Goddess
September	Golden Fleece Stakes	Leopardstown	1m 1f	2yo c&f	Darkness Falls
September	Matron Stakes	Leopardstown	1m	3yo+ f	Blue Bolt
September	Irish Champion Stakes	Leopardstown	1m 2f	3yo+	Hotazhell
September	Moyglare Stud Stakes	Curragh	7f	2yo f	Sun Goddess
September	Flying Five Stakes	Curragh	5f	3yo+	Comanche Brave
September	Vincent O'Brien National Stakes	Curragh	7f	2yo c&f	Folsom Blues
September	Irish St Leger	Curragh	1m 6f	3yo+	Scandinavia

== Group 2 ==
Month	Race Name	Racecourse	Distance	Age/Sex	2026 winner
May	Mooresbridge Stakes	Curragh	1m 2f	4yo+	Minnie Hauk
May	Greenlands Stakes	Curragh	6f	4yo+	Comanche Brave
May	Ridgewood Pearl Stakes	Curragh	1m	4yo+ f	City Of Memphis
June	Airlie Stud Stakes	Curragh	6f	2yo f	Sun Goddess
July	Sapphire Stakes	Curragh	5f	3yo+	Cover Up
July	Railway Stakes	Curragh	6f	2yo	Celeron
July	Minstrel Stakes	Curragh	7f	3yo+	Power Blue
July	Curragh Cup	Curragh	1m 6f	3yo+	Trustyourinstinct
August	Debutante Stakes	Curragh	7f	2yo f	Green Empress
August	Futurity Stakes	Curragh	7f	2yo	Giant Sequoia
September	Solonaway Stakes	Leopardstown	1m	3yo+	Quddwah
September	Blandford Stakes	Curragh	1m 2f	3yo+ f	Thundering On
September	Beresford Stakes	Curragh	1m	2yo	Noble Exhibit

== Group 3 ==
Month	Race Name	Racecourse	Distance	Age/Sex	2026 winner
April	Park Express Stakes	Curragh	1m	3yo+ f	Celestial Orbit
April	Leopardstown 2,000 Guineas Trial Stakes	Leopardstown	7f	3yo c&g	Thesecretadversary
April	Leopardstown 1,000 Guineas Trial Stakes	Leopardstown	7f	3yo f	True Love
April	Ballysax Stakes	Leopardstown	1m 2f	3yo	Christmas Day
April	Alleged Stakes	Curragh	1m 2f	4yo+	Starford
April	Salsabil Stakes	Navan	1m 2f	3yo f	Thundering On
May	Athasi Stakes	Curragh	1m	3yo f	Kensington Lane
May	Mutamakina Stakes	Leopardstown	7f	3yo+ f	City Of Memphis
May	Cashel Palace Hotel Derby Trial	Leopardstown	1m 2f	3yo	James J Braddock
May	Saval Beg Stakes	Leopardstown	1m 6f	4yo+	Scandinavia
May	Fillies' Sprint Stakes	Naas	6f	2yo f	Victorious
May	Lacken Stakes	Naas	6f	3yo	Havana Anna
May	Gallinule Stakes	Curragh	1m 2f	3yo	Causeway
May	Marble Hill Stakes	Curragh	6f	2yo	Great Barrier Reef
June	Ballycorus Stakes	Leopardstown	7f	3yo+	Native Warrior
June	Munster Oaks	Cork	1m 4f	3yo+ f	Sparan Nua
June	Blue Wind Stakes	Naas	1m 2½f	3yo f	Rebel Moon
June	Anglesey Stakes	Curragh	6½f	2yo	Ballinea Star
June	International Stakes	Curragh	1m 2f	3yo+	Purview
July	Stannera Stakes	Fairyhouse	1m 6f	3yo+ f	Floresta
July	Brownstown Stakes	Leopardstown	7f	3yo+ f	Duckadilly
July	Meld Stakes	Leopardstown	1m 1f	3yo+	Geryon
July	Rathbride Stakes	Curragh	1m 2f	4yo+ f	Moody
July	Silver Flash Stakes	Leopardstown	7f	2yo f	Alpha
July	Tyros Stakes	Leopardstown	7f	2yo	Florida Bay
August	Desmond Stakes	Leopardstown	1m	3yo+	Isaac Newton
August	Ballyroan Stakes	Leopardstown	1m 4f	3yo+	Ethical Diamond
August	Phoenix Sprint Stakes	Curragh	6f	3yo+	Big Mojo
August	Give Thanks Stakes	Cork	1m 4f	3yo+ f	Believed
August	Royal Whip Stakes	Curragh	1m 2f	3yo+	A Boy Named Susie
August	Irish St Leger Trial Stakes	Curragh	1m 6f	3yo+	Queenstown
August	Ballyogan Stakes	Naas	6f	3yo+ f	Chantez
August	Flame Of Tara Stakes	Curragh	1m	2yo f	Sea Of Rain
August	Round Tower Stakes	Curragh	6f	2yo	Push The Boat Out
August	Snow Fairy Stakes	Curragh	1m 1f	3yo+ f	Miss Scott
August	Fairy Bridge Stakes	Cork	7f	3yo+ f	Magny Cours
September	Kilternan Stakes	Leopardstown	1m 4f	3yo+	Arabian Crown
September	Denny Cordell Lavarack Fillies Stakes	Gowran Park	1m 1½f	3yo+ f	Syzygy
September	Renaissance Stakes	Curragh	6f	3yo+	Soul Love
September	Weld Park Stakes	Curragh	7f	2yo f	Curracloe
October	Eyrefield Stakes	Leopardstown	1m 1f	2yo	Wall Street
October	Killavullan Stakes	Leopardstown	7f	2yo	Capability Brown
October	Staffordstown Stud Stakes	Curragh	1m	2yo f	Chattering Classes
**October**	**Mercury Stakes**	**Dundalk**	**5f**	**2yo+**	**Washington Heights**
November	Loughbrown Stakes	Curragh	2m ½f	3yo+	Amelia Earhart

== Listed ==
Month	Race Name	Racecourse	Distance	Age/Sex	2026 winner
March	Devoy Stakes	Naas	1m 2½f	4yo+	Beset
March	Gladness Stakes	Curragh	7f	3yo+	Big Gossey
April	Cork Stakes	Cork	6f	3yo+	Navassa Island
April	Noblesse Stakes	Cork	1m 4f	4yo+ f	Moody
April	Heritage Stakes	Leopardstown	1m	4yo+	The Lion In Winter
April	Committed Stakes	Navan	6f	3yo	Charles Darwin
April	Vintage Crop Stakes	Navan	1m 6f	4yo+	Scandinavia
April	Woodlands Stakes	Naas	5f	3yo+	Mission Central
May	Polonia Stakes	Cork	5½f	3yo f	Royal Bay Cen
May	First Flier Stakes	Curragh	5f	2yo	Velozee
May	Tetrarch Stakes	Curragh	1m	3yo	Causeway
May	Vintage Tipple Stakes	Gowran Park	1m 6f	4yo+ f	Moody
May	Victor McCalmont Memorial Stakes	Gowran Park	1m 1½f	4yo+ f	Sindria
May	Naas Oaks Trial	Naas	1m 2½f	3yo f	Caught U Sleeping
May	Amethyst Stakes	Leopardstown	1m	3yo+	Catalina Delcarpio
May	Yeats Stakes	Navan	1m 5f	3yo	Limestone
May	Owenstown Stud Stakes	Naas	7f	3yo+	Wannabe Royal
May	Sole Power Sprint Stakes	Naas	5f	3yo+	Mission Central
May	Orby Stakes	Curragh	1m 4f	4yo+	Purview
May	His Majesty's Plate	Down Royal	2m	4yo+	Carmers
June	King George V Cup	Leopardstown	1m 4f	3yo	Endorsement
June	Glencairn Stakes	Navan	1m 1f	3yo+	Isaac Newton
June	Kooyonga Stakes	Navan	1m	3yo+ f	Duckadilly
June	Midsummer Sprint Stakes	Cork	5f	3yo+	Kendall Roy
June	Martin Molony Stakes	Limerick	1m 4½f	3yo+	Layfayette
June	Belgrave Stakes	Curragh	6f	3yo+	Big Gossey
June	Celebration Stakes	Curragh	1m	3yo+	Zodiac Bear
June	Lenebane Stakes	Roscommon	1m 4f	3yo+	Bosphorus Rose
July	Tipperary Stakes	Naas	5f	2yo	Carry The Flag
July	Pat Smullen Stakes	Naas	1m	2yo	Dancing Destiny
July	Cairn Rouge Stakes	Killarney	1m	3yo f	Meriden
July	Marwell Stakes	Naas	5f	2yo f	Big Negotiator
July	Yeomanstown Stud Stakes	Naas	6f	3yo+ f	Soul Love
July	Marble City Stakes	Gowran Park	1m 4f	3yo	Nil Bua Gan Dua
July	Corrib Fillies Stakes	Galway	7f	3yo+ f	Pivotal Attack
August	Churchill Stakes	Gowran Park	1m	2yo	Sergei Diaghilev
August	Hurry Harriet Stakes	Gowran Park	1m 1½f	3yo+ f	Star Performer
August	Firville Stakes	Cork	7f	2yo f	Alwaysanangel
August	Platinum Stakes	Cork	7f	3yo+	Suzie Songs
August	Curragh Stakes	Curragh	5f	2yo	Armor Supreme
August	Vinnie Roe Stakes	Leopardstown	1m 6f	3yo	Highwayman
August	Ruby Stakes	Killarney	1m	3yo+	Jagged Edge
August	Abergwaun Stakes	Cork	5f	3yo+	Likedbymike
September	Oyster Stakes	Galway	1m 4f	3yo+ f	Beset
September	Ingabelle Stakes	Leopardstown	7f	2yo f	Maire Rua
September	Blenheim Stakes	Fairyhouse	6f	2yo	Big Negotiator
September	Listowel Stakes	Listowel	1m	3yo+	Meriden
**September**	**Diamond Stakes**	**Dundalk**	**1m 2½f**	**3yo+**	**Military Order**
**October**	**Legacy Stakes**	**Dundalk**	**5f**	**2yo**	**Shimmering Sun**
**October**	**Star Appeal Stakes**	**Dundalk**	**7f**	**2yo**	**Joga Bonito**
October	Concorde Stakes	Curragh	7f	3yo+	King Cuan
October	Brigid's Pastures Stakes	Curragh	6f	3yo+ f	Carla Ridge
October	Navigation Stakes	Cork (Note: Run at Killarney in 2026 after Cork fixture was abandoned due to strong winds)	1m 3f	3yo	Shaihaan
October	RFL Steels Stakes	Naas	6f	3yo+	Bamako Beach
October	Garnet Stakes	Naas	1m	3yo+ f	Princess Child
October	Bluebell Stakes	Naas	1m 4f	3yo+ f	Snapretend
October	Knockaire Stakes	Leopardstown	1m ½f	3yo+	King Cuan
October	Trigo Stakes	Leopardstown	1m 2f	3yo+	Come What May
November	Finale Stakes	Curragh	1m 4f	3yo+	Thread Of Gold
**November**	**Cooley Fillies Stakes**	**Dundalk**	**1m**	**3yo+ f**	**Aviatrice**

== Premier Handicaps ==
Month	Race Name	Racecourse	Distance	Age/Sex	2026 winner
March	Irish Lincolnshire	Curragh	1m	4yo+	Ribee
March	Madrid Handicap	Naas	7f	3yo	Causeway
April	Emerald Cup	Curragh	1m 2f	4yo+	Fiver Friday
April	Blackwater Handicap	Naas	1m	3yo	Bobby McGee
May	Cork Derby	Cork	1m 4f	4yo+	Londonofficecallin
May	Nas Na Laighean Handicap	Naas	6f	3yo	Chicago Pope
May	Royal County Handicap	Navan	1m 2f	3yo	Santa Bravado
May	Keadeen Hotel Handicap	Curragh	1m 2f	4yo+	Perry Mason
May	Habitat Handicap	Curragh	6f	4yo+	Headmaster
May	Spring Fillies' Handicap	Curragh	1m	3yo f	Green Carrera
June	Junefest Handicap	Curragh	5f	3yo	Amiata
June	Lilywhites Handicap	Curragh	1m 6f	4yo+	Poetic Sound
June	Mallow Handicap	Cork	7f	3yo+	Gleneagle Bay
June	Ulster Derby	Down Royal	1m 5f	3yo	Madbadanddangerous
June	Summer Fillies' Handicap	Curragh	7f	3yo+ f	Meriden
June	Rockingham Handicap	Curragh	5f	3yo+	Genesis
June	Derby Festival Handicap	Curragh	1m	3yo+	Pierre Royal
June	Maddenstown Handicap	Curragh	1m 1f	3yo	King Of Earth
June	Ragusa Handicap	Curragh	1m 4f	4yo+	In My Teens
July	Nasrullah Handicap	Leopardstown	1m 1f	3yo+	Thread Of Gold
July	Scurry Handicap	Curragh	6½f	3yo+	Sondad
July	Doneraile Handicap	Cork	5f	3yo+	Ipanema Queen
July	Connacht Hotel (Q.R.) Handicap	Galway	2m 1f	4yo+	Comfort Zone
July	COLM QUINN BMW Mile Handicap	Galway	1m ½f	3yo+	Orandi
July	Guinness Handicap	Galway	1m 4f	3yo+	Thread Of Gold
August	Ahonoora Handicap	Galway	7f	3yo+	Dunum
**August**	**Red God Handicap**	**Dundalk**	**1m 2½f**	**3yo+**	**Touch The Moon**
August	Kingdom Gold Cup	Killarney	1m 6½f	3yo+	Gaoth Chuil
August	Irish Cambridgeshire	Curragh	1m	3yo+	Loughrea
September	Sovereign Path Handicap	Leopardstown	7f	3yo+	Krasimir
September	Pentingo Handicap	Leopardstown	1m 5f	3yo+	Immutable
September	Autumn Fillies' Handicap	Leopardstown	1m ½f	3yo+ f	Rebel Wave
September	Bold Lad Sprint Handicap	Curragh	6f	3yo+	Coul Angel
September	Northfields Handicap	Curragh	1m 2f	3yo+	Orandi
September	Old Weir Handicap	Listowel	1m 4f	3yo+	Handani
September	Joe McGrath Handicap	Curragh	5f	3yo+	Red Evolution
September	Irish Cesarewitch	Curragh	2m 1f	3yo+	Chally Chute
October	Birdcatcher Premier Nursery Handicap	Naas	6f	2yo	Pink Venom
October	Beggar's End Handicap	Naas	2m	3yo+	Abbotsford
October	October Handicap	Leopardstown	1m 3½f	3yo+	Truth Be Told
November	Keadeen Hotel Premier Handicap	Curragh	1m	3yo+	Java Wood

== Conditions & sales races ==
Month	Race Name	Racecourse	Status	Distance	Age/Sex	2026 winner
**February**	**Patton Stakes**	**Dundalk**	**Conditions**	**1m**	**3yo**	**Blanc De Blanc**
June	Gowran Classic	Gowran Park	Conditions	1m 1½f	3yo	Bunyola Bay
August	Ballyhane Stakes	Naas	Conditions	6f	2yo	Livenka
September	Tattersalls Ireland Super Auction Sales Stakes	Curragh	Sales	6½f	2yo	Star Of State
September	Goffs Million	Curragh	Sales	7f	2yo	Trean
October	Irish EBF Auction Series Race Final	Naas	Sales	7f	2yo	Diamonds And Dames

== Discontinued ==
**Last Run**	**Race Name**	**Racecourse**	**Distance**	**Age/Sex**
October 1994	Leopardstown Stakes	Leopardstown	7f	2yo
September 2009	Goffs Million Mile	Curragh	1m	2yo
September 2009	Goffs Million Sprint	Curragh	6f	2yo
