= Matron Stakes (Ireland) =

Flat horse race in Ireland

- Class: Group 1
- Location: Leopardstown; County Dublin, Ireland
- Race type: Flat / Thoroughbred
- Sponsor: Coolmore
- Website: Leopardstown

Race information
- Distance: 1 mile (1,609 metres)
- Surface: Turf
- Track: Left-handed
- Qualification: Three-years-old and up fillies and mares
- Weight: 9 st 0 lb (3yo); 9 st 5 lb (4yo+)
- Purse: €376,000 (2022); 1st: €236,000

Matron Stakes
2026
Blue Bolt	City Of Memphis	Fallen Angel

Previous years
2025
Fallen Angel	Exactly	Atsila
2024
Porta Fortuna	Fallen Angel	Soprano
2023
Tahiyra	Rogue Millennium	Just Beautiful
2022
Pearls Galore	Saffron Beach	Tenebrism
2021
No Speak Alexander	Pearls Galore	Mother Earth

2020-2011
2020
Champers Elysees	Peaceful	Fancy Blue
2019
Iridessa	Hermosa	Just Wonderful
2018
Laurens	Alpha Centauri	Clemmie
2017
Hydrangea	Winter	Persuasive
2016
Alice Springs	Persuasive	Qemah
2015
Legatissimo	Cladocera	Ainippe
2014
Fiesolana	Rizeena	Tobann
2013
La Collina	Lily's Angel	Say
2012
Chachamaidee	Duntle	Emulous
2011
Emulous	Together	Misty For Me

2010-2001
2010
Lillie Langtry	Spacious	Music Show
2009
Rainbow View	Heaven Sent	Again
2008
Lush Lashes	Nahoodh	Halfway To Heaven
2007
Echelon	Red Evie	Arch Swing
2006
Red Evie	Peeress	Flashy Wings
2005
Attraction	Chic	Virginia Waters
2004
Soviet Song	Attraction	Phantom Wind
2003
Favourable Terms	Perfect Touch	Dossier
2002
Dress To Thrill	Marionnaud	Fallen Star
2001
Independence	Toroca	Danceabout

2000-1991
2000
Iftiraas	Danceabout	Out Of Reach
1999
Dazzling Park	Carambola	Putuna
1998
Tadwiga	Darina	Heed My Warning
1997
Clerio	Supercal	Dangerous Diva
1996
Donna Viola	Hagwah	Charlock
1995
Timarida	Lap Of Luxury	Warning Shadows
1994
Eternal Reve	Andromaque	Girl From Ipanema
1993
Chanzi	Asema	Cloud Of Dust
1992
Cloud Of Dust	Soiree	Tarwiya
1991
Kooyonga	Blue Daisy	Rua D'Oro

1990-1988
1990
Spring Daffodil	Sajjaya	Tafila
1989
Upward Trend	Awayed	Llyn Gwynant
1988
Llyn Gwynant	Trusted Partner	Bell Tower

The Matron Stakes is a Group 1 flat horse race in Ireland open to thoroughbred fillies and mares aged three years or older. It is run at Leopardstown over a distance of 1 mile (1,609 metres), and it is scheduled to take place each year in September.

== History ==
The event was formerly known as the Gilltown Stud Stakes, and it used to be held at the Curragh. For a period it was classed at Group 3 level. It was renamed the Matron Stakes in the mid 1980s.

The race was transferred to Leopardstown in 2002. It was promoted to Group 2 status in 2003, and to Group 1 in 2004. It is now sponsored by Coolmore Stud, and its full title includes the name of Justify, a Coolmore stallion. In 2014 it was moved back a week in September to become part of a new Irish Champions Weekend fixture.

== Records ==
Most successful horse since 1980:

- no horse has won this race more than once since 1980

Leading jockey since 1980 (3 wins):

- Johnny Murtagh – Timarida (1995), Soviet Song (2004), Lillie Langtry (2010)

Leading trainer since 1980 (4 wins):

- John Dunlop – Mary Mitsu (1982), Llyn Gwynant (1988), Cloud of Dust (1992), Iftiraas (2000)

Leading owner since 1986 (4 wins):

- Tabor / Derrick Smith / Magnier - Lillie Langtry (2010), Legatissimo (2015), Alice Springs (2016), Hydrangea (2017)

== Winners since 1986 ==
Year	Winner	Age	Jockey	Trainer	Owner	Time
1986	Grey Goddess	3	Stephen Craine	Edward O'Grady	Mrs K. Watts
1987	Pixie Erin	3	Michael Hills	Barry Hills	Robert Sangster	1:43.50
1988	Llyn Gwynant	3	Willie Carson	John Dunlop	J. Macdonald-Buchanan	1:44.50
1989	Upward Trend	3	Christy Roche	Jim Bolger	Paul Green	1:39.10
1990	Spring Daffodil	3	Declan Gillespie	Augustine Leahy	Golden Vale Syndicate	1:38.90
1991	Kooyonga	3	Warren O'Connor	Michael Kauntze	Mitsuo Haga	1:41.30
1992	Cloud of Dust	3	Michael Roberts	John Dunlop	Peggy Kwoh	1:44.50
1993	Chanzi	3	Michael Roberts	John Oxx	Sheikh Mohammed	1:42.00
1994	Eternal Reve	3	Michael Kinane	François Boutin	Sheikh Mohammed	1:41.60
1995	Timarida	3	Johnny Murtagh	John Oxx	HH Aga Khan IV	1:38.10
1996	Donna Viola	4	John Reid	Chris Wall	Kieran Scott	1:39.90
1997	Clerio	3	Michael Kinane	Henri-Alex Pantall	Sheikh Mohammed	1:42.10
1998	Tadwiga	3	Richard Hughes	Richard Hannon Sr.	Stonethorn Stud Farms	1:41.30
1999	Dazzling Park	3	Kevin Manning	Jim Bolger	Mrs Seamus Burns	1:39.00
2000	Iftiraas	3	George Duffield	John Dunlop	Kuwait Racing Syndicate	1:39.60
2001	Independence	3	Frankie Dettori	Ed Dunlop	Cliveden Stud	1:39.20
2002	Dress to Thrill	3	Pat Smullen	Dermot Weld	Moyglare Stud Farm	1:40.10
2003	Favourable Terms	3	Kieren Fallon	Sir Michael Stoute	Maktoum Al Maktoum	1:39.90
2004	Soviet Song	4	Johnny Murtagh	James Fanshawe	Elite Racing Club	1:36.80
2005	Attraction	4	Kevin Darley	Mark Johnston	10th Duke of Roxburghe	1:38.90
2006	Red Evie	3	Jamie Spencer	Michael Bell	Neill / Bell	1:38.70
2007	Echelon	5	Ryan Moore	Sir Michael Stoute	Cheveley Park Stud	1:39.52
2008	Lush Lashes	3	Kevin Manning	Jim Bolger	Jackie Bolger	1:40.73
2009	Rainbow View	3	Jimmy Fortune	John Gosden	George Strawbridge	1:39.89
2010	Lillie Langtry	3	Johnny Murtagh	Aidan O'Brien	Tabor / Smith / Magnier	1:39.68
2011	Emulous	4	Pat Smullen	Dermot Weld	Khalid Abdullah	1:38.47
2012	Chachamaidee ^{[a]}	5	Tom Queally	Sir Henry Cecil	R. A. H. Evans	1:37.58
2013	La Collina	4	Chris Hayes	Kevin Prendergast	Joerg Vasicek	1:39.00
2014	Fiesolana	5	Billy Lee	Willie McCreery	Flaxman Stables	1:38.16
2015	Legatissimo	3	Wayne Lordan	David Wachman	Tabor / Smith / Magnier	1:39.95
2016	Alice Springs	3	Ryan Moore	Aidan O'Brien	Tabor / Smith / Magnier	1:42.08
2017	Hydrangea	3	Wayne Lordan	Aidan O'Brien	Tabor / Smith / Magnier	1:41.89
2018	Laurens	3	Daniel Tudhope	Karl Burke	John Dance	1:39.23
2019	Iridessa	3	Wayne Lordan	Joseph Patrick O'Brien	Mrs C Regaldo Onzalez	1:38.31
2020	Champers Elysees	3	Colin Keane	Johnny Murtagh	Fitzwilliam Racing	1:39.77
2021	No Speak Alexander	3	Shane Foley	Jessica Harrington	Charles O'Callaghan	1:41.98
2022	Pearls Galore	5	Billy Lee	Paddy Twomey	Haras de Saint Pair du Mont	1:44.36
2023	Tahiyra	3	Chris Hayes	Dermot Weld	Aga Khan IV	1:37.50
2024	Porta Fortuna	3	Tom Marquand	Donnacha O'Brien	Medallion/S Weston/B Fowler/Reeves T'Bs	1:40.67
2025	Fallen Angel	4	James Doyle	Karl Burke	Wathnan Racing	1:38.93
2026	Blue Bolt	4	Colin Keane	Andrew Balding	Juddmonte	1:38.11

^{a} Duntle finished first in 2012, but she was relegated to second place following a stewards' inquiry.

== Earlier winners ==
- 1980: Calandra
- 1981: Tumblella
- 1982: Mary Mitsu
- 1983: Mighty Fly
- 1984: Clare Bridge
- 1985: Only

== See also ==
- Horse racing in Ireland
- List of Irish flat horse races
