= Committed Stakes =

Flat horse race in Ireland

Committed Stakes
2025
Whistlejacket	Ides Of March	Sparkling Sea

Previous years
2024
Givemethebeatboys	Betsen	My Mate Alfie
2023
Ocean Quest	Aesop's Fables	The Antarctic
2022
New York City	Straight Answer	Cadamosto
2021
Measure Of Magic	Logo Hunter	Lipizzaner

2020-2016
2020
Punita Arora	Alligator Alley	Pistoletto
2019
Inverleigh	The Irish Rover	Cava
2018
The Broghie Man	Speak In Colours	Fleet Review
2017
Khukri	Gorane	Intelligence Cross
2016
Washington Dc	Diamond Fields	Only Mine

The Committed Stakes is a Listed flat horse race in Ireland open to thoroughbreds aged three years only. It is run at Navan over a distance of 5 furlongs and 164 yards (1,156 metres), and it is scheduled to take place each year in April. The race is named after Committed, an Irish-trained racehorse who was one of the leading sprinters in Europe in the mid-1980s.

The race was run for the first time in 2016 as the Power Stakes. It took its present name in 2018.

== Records ==
Leading jockey (3 wins):

- Shane Foley – Punita Arora (2020), Ocean Quest (2023), Givemethebeatboys (2024)

Leading trainer (4 wins):

- Jessica Harrington - Khukri (2017), Punita Arora (2020), Ocean Quest (2023), Givemethebeatboys (2024)
- Aidan O'Brien - Washington DC (2016), New York City (2022), Whistlejacket (2025), Charles Darwin (2026)

== Winners ==
Year	Winner	Jockey	Trainer	Time
2016	Washington DC	Seamie Heffernan	Aidan O'Brien	1:10.60
2017	Khukri	Colm O'Donoghue	Jessica Harrington	1:09.99
2018	The Broghie Man	Gerald Mosse	Adrian Paul Keatley	1:13.12
2019	Inverleigh	Donagh O'Connor	Ger Lyons	1:14.04
2020	Punita Arora (Note: The 2020 running was run over 5½ furlongs at Naas in June due to the COVID-19 pandemic in the Republic of Ireland)	Shane Foley	Jessica Harrington	1:03.96
2021	Measure of Magic	Ben Coen	Johnny Murtagh	1:13.06
2022	New York City	Wayne Lordan	Aidan O'Brien	1:12.00
2023	Ocean Quest	Shane Foley	Jessica Harrington	1:18.31
2024	Givemethebeatboys	Shane Foley	Jessica Harrington	1:14.52
2025	Whistlejacket	Ryan Moore	Aidan O'Brien	1:13.12
2026	Charles Darwin	Ryan Moore	Aidan O'Brien	1:11.40

== See also ==
- Horse racing in Ireland
- List of Irish flat horse races
