= Killarney Racecourse =

Horse racing venue in Killarney, Ireland

Killarney Racecourse is a horse racing venue in Killarney, County Kerry, Ireland which stages both National Hunt and Flat racing. Racing at Killarney has been taking place since 1822. The course is a left-handed oval, one mile and two furlongs in circumference.
