= Irish Classic Races =

Irish horse races

The Irish Classics are five Group One horse races run at The Curragh racecourse during the flat racing season. They mirror the British Classic Races, the original five "classics", with one minor exception. The Irish St. Leger is open to horses older than age three, unlike the British counterpart which is restricted to three-year-olds, and is open to geldings, which are barred from all other British and Irish classics.

== Races ==
The five Irish Classics are:

| Race | Date | Distance | Course | First Run |
|---|---|---|---|---|
| Irish 1,000 Guineas | May | 1 mile | The Curragh | 1922 |
| Irish 2,000 Guineas | May | 1 mile | The Curragh | 1921 |
| Irish Derby | Late June/early July | 1 mile 4 furlongs | The Curragh | 1866 |
| Irish Oaks | July | 1 mile 4 furlongs | The Curragh | 1895 |
| Irish St. Leger | September | 1 mile 6 furlongs | The Curragh | 1915 |

== See also ==
- British Classic Races
- French Classic Races
- Japanese Classic Races
- United States Triple Crown of Thoroughbred Racing
