= Dylan Browne McMonagle =

Irish jockey (born 2003)

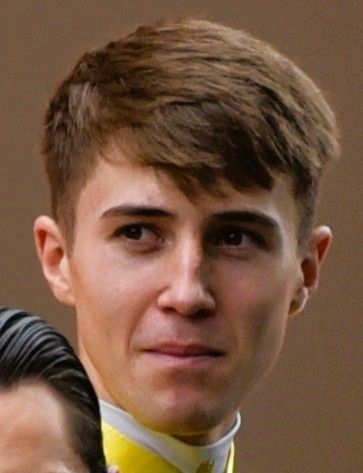
- McMonagle in February 2026

Personal information
- Nationality: Irish
- Born: 6 March 2003 (age 23) Letterkenny, County Donegal, Ireland
- Occupation: Jockey

Horse racing career
- Sport: Horse racing

Dylan Browne McMonagle（born 6 March 2003) is a multiple Group 1-winning Irish jockey who competes in flat racing. He was the 2025 Irish Champion Jockey.

== Background ==
Dylan Browne McMonagle was born on 6 March 2003 in Letterkenny, County Donegal, Ireland. He rode on the pony racing circuit for his uncle Adrian Browne and secured 218 wins including the Dingle Derby. He was twice pony racing champion. He also won an All-Ireland boys' boxing championship.

== Racing career ==
Aged 16, Browne McMonagle was apprenticed to trainer Joseph Patrick O'Brien in 2019. He rode his first winner, Jumellea, on 9 October 2019 at Navan. In April 2021 he had his first ride in a Group race, winning the Group 3 Vintage Crop Stakes at Navan on 20/1 outsider Baron Samedi. He was champion Irish apprentice in 2021 with 48 winners, and also won an emerging talent award from Horse Racing Ireland. He won his first Group 1 race on Al Riffa for Joseph O'Brien in the Vincent O'Brien National Stakes at the Curragh on 11 September 2022, a ride for which he won a Horse Racing Ireland flat achievement award. He retained his apprentice title with 49 winners in 2022. In 2023, his first season riding with a full professional licence, Browne McMonagle won two Group 3 races and a Group 2 race for Joseph O'Brien. He went to Australia during the winter and rode 11 winners there. His first Royal Ascot winner was Uxmal, trained by Joseph O'Brien, in the 2024 Queen Alexandra Stakes.

Browne McMonagle won his first Irish Classic on Al Riffa for Joseph O'Brien in the 2025 Irish St. Leger. At the end of the season he was crowned Irish Champion Jockey, finishing on 95 winners. On 1 November 2025, he won the Breeders' Cup Turf on Ethical Diamond, trained by Willie Mullins, at odds of 20/1. He secured an invitation to ride in Hong Kong for three months from January to March 2026.

In 2026, Browne McMonagle won his first British Classic with a last-to-first, hands and heels ride on Thundering On for Joseph O'Brien in the Oaks. He then won the Irish Oaks on Johanna Walsh. In late August he was injured in a fall in Bellewstown and spent six weeks on the sidelines.

== Major wins ==
(Republic of Ireland) Ireland

- Irish Oaks - (1) - Johanna Walsh (2026)
- Irish St. Leger - (1) - Al Riffa (2025)
- Vincent O'Brien National Stakes - (2) - Al Riffa (2022), Scorthy Champ (2024)

France

- Critérium de Saint-Cloud - (1) - Tennessee Stud (2024)

Germany

- Grosser Preis von Berlin - (1) - Al Riffa (2024)

(United Kingdom) Great Britain

- Epsom Oaks - (1) - Thundering On (2026)
- Futurity Trophy - (1) - Giant Sequoia (2026)

United States

- Breeders' Cup Turf - (1) - Ethical Diamond (2025)
