= Ronan Whelan =

Irish jockey (born 1992)

Personal information
- Nationality: Irish
- Born: 2 November 1992 (age 33) Monasterevin, County Kildare, Ireland
- Occupation: Jockey

Horse racing career
- Sport: Horse racing

Ronan Whelan（born 2 November 1992) is a multiple Group 1-winning Irish jockey who competes in flat racing and won the 2026 Epsom Derby on Christmas Day.

== Background ==
Whelan was born in Monasterevin, County Kildare, Ireland, where his parents, Kathleen and Tom Whelan, have a pre-training yard. Whelan rode 95 winners on the pony racing circuit and was crowned champion rider in 2008.

== Racing career ==
Aged 16, Whelan was apprenticed to trainer Jim Bolger. He rode his first winner, Seachtanach, trained by Bolger, on 5 June 2009 at Navan. In 2012 he was crowned champion Irish apprentice with 41 winners. He secured his first Group race winner with Custom Cut for George Kent in the Gladness Stakes at the Curragh in April 2013. He rode his first Royal Ascot winner in 2016, when Jennies Jewel, trained by Jarlath Fahey, won the Ascot Stakes.

Whelan achieved his first Group 1 win in September 2018, when Skitter Scatter, trained by Patrick Prendergast]] won the Moyglare Stud Stakes. More Group 1 successes followed on A Case Of You, trained by Adrian McGuinness, who won the 2021 Prix de l'Abbaye de Longchamp in France and the 2022 Al Quoz Sprint at the Meydan Racecourse in Dubai.

Having ridden as stable jockey to Michael Halford, Whelan joined the Ballydoyle stable of trainer Aidan O'Brien in 2025, and won Group 1 races for the trainer on Precise and Hawk Mountain before the end of the season. He achieved the biggest success of his career on 6 June 2026, winning the Epsom Derby on O'Brien's third string, Christmas Day. After the race, Whelan said: ""It was just so easy. Aidan just told me to keep it simple. The horse has done it so easy. He loves the [soft] ground and it just felt so effortless for him." The rain-soaked horse and jockey were led into the winner's enclosure by Whelan's parents.

== Major wins ==
(Republic of Ireland) Ireland

- Moyglare Stud Stakes - (2) - Skitter Scatter (2018), Precise (2025)

France

- Prix de l'Abbaye de Longchamp - (1) - A Case Of You (2021)

(United Kingdom) Great Britain

- Futurity Trophy - (1) - Hawk Mountain (2025)
- Epsom Derby - (1) - Christmas Day (2026)

(United Arab Emirates) UAE

- Al Quoz Sprint - (1) - A Case Of You (2022)
