= Fran Berry =

Irish Flat racing jockey

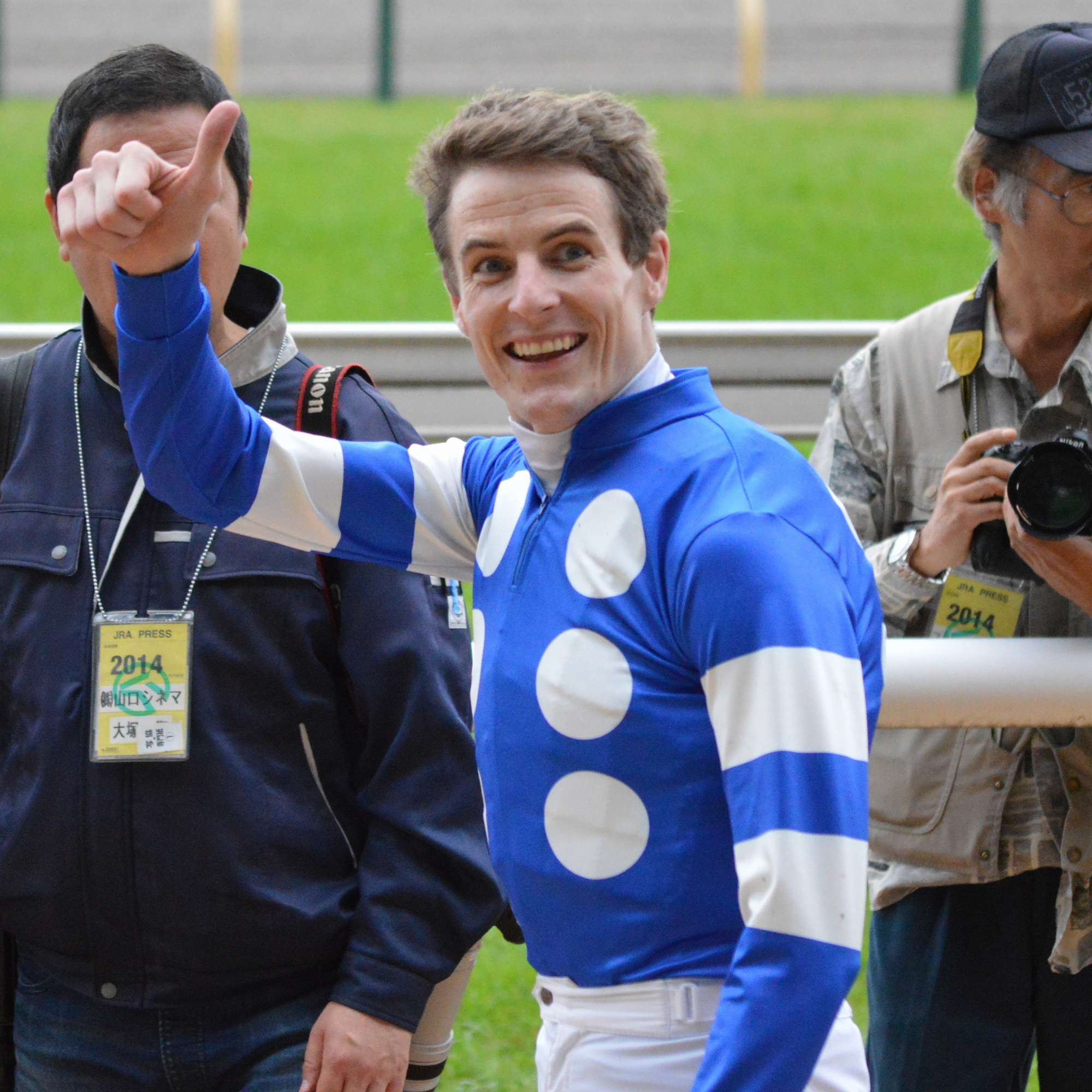
- Fran Berry in 2014

Personal information
- Full name: Francis Martin Berry
- Nationality: Irish
- Born: 2 January 1981 (age 45) County Kildare, Ireland
- Height: 173 cm (5 ft 8 in)
- Weight: 55 kg (121 lb)

Horse racing career
- Sport: Horse racing

Francis Martin Berry (born 2 January 1981) in County Kildare is a retired Irish jockey who competed principally in Flat racing. Berry's father, Frank Berry, was Irish jump racing champion jockey ten times, and saddled Fran's first winner on Mayasta at Sligo Racecourse in April 1997.

Berry began his career as a National Hunt jockey, winning the Coral Cup at Cheltenham in 1999 but went on to concentrate on Flat racing. He was employed as second jockey at John Oxx's stable from 2002 to 2009 and took over as leading jockey for Oxx in 2010. From 2011 onwards he rode for Jessica Harrington and John Kiely. In 2016, he moved to Britain to become stable jockey for Ralph Beckett, an association which lasted until Berry left ‘by mutual consent’ when he was relieved of the role in June 2017. He remained in Britain to ride as a freelance jockey.

Berry sustained spinal injuries in a fall at Wolverhampton in January 2019 and retired on medical advice in April of that year. He rode 1,020 winners in Flat racing in Ireland and another 200 winners in Britain, as well as 37 jumps winners in Ireland and 4 in Britain.

== Major wins ==
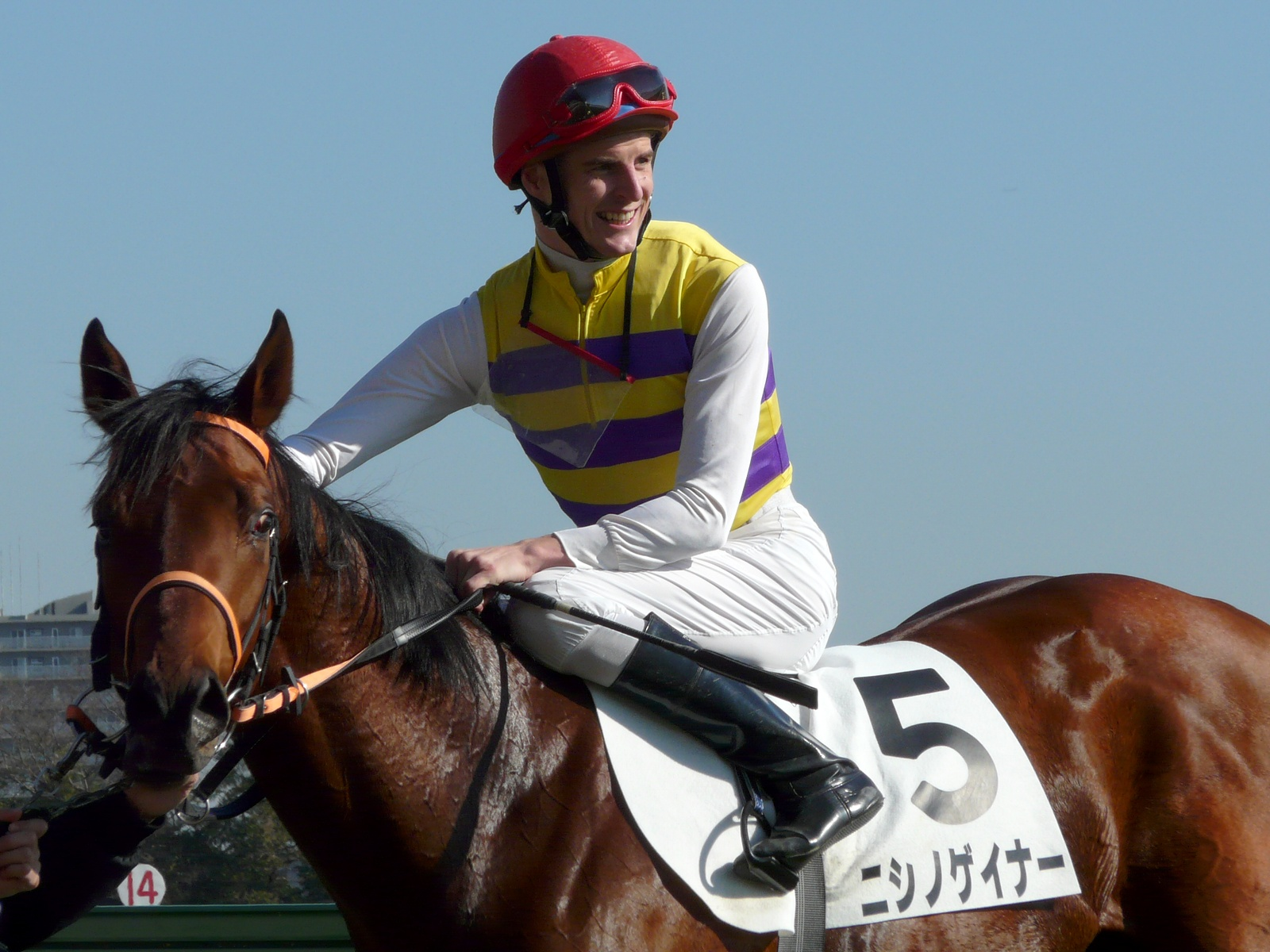
Francis Martin Berry in 2011

(Republic of Ireland) Ireland

- Vincent O'Brien National Stakes - (1) - Pathfork (2010)
