= Chris Hayes (jockey) =

Irish jockey competing in flat racing

Chris Hayes (born 11 August 1987) in County Limerick is an Irish jockey who competes in Flat racing.

Hayes wanted to be a solicitor as a child, but changed his mind when introduced to pony racing. After attending the Racing Academy and Centre of Education (RACE) in Kildare, he joined the stable of Kevin Prendergast in 2004 as an apprentice jockey. He was Irish champion apprentice in 2005, 2006 and 2007.

His first Group race win was on Capt Chaos (renamed Energized) in the Group 3 Tetrarch Stakes for trainer Edward Lynam in May 2008. He had to wait five years for his first Group 1 win, on La Collina, trained by Prendergast, in the Irish Matron Stakes on 7 September 2013. Eight days later he secured his first Irish Classic victory when Voleuse de Coeurs, trained by Dermot Weld, won the Irish St. Leger.

In 2017 he became first jockey to Fozzy Stack, alongside his role as Prendergast's stable jockey. In 2019 he became first jockey to Dermot Weld. In September 2019 the partnership achieved another Irish St. Leger win with Search For A Song. Hayes rode Homeless Songs to victory for Weld in the 2022 Irish 1,000 Guineas. That season and the next, there were four Group 1 wins with the Weld-trained Tahiyra, including another win in the Irish 1,000 Guineas. On 31 May 2024, Hayes secured his first British Classic when Ezeliya won the Epsom Oaks, again for trainer Weld.

Hayes, together with his wife Rachel, also breeds racehorses. He bought his first broodmare, Butoolat, for 10,000 guineas in 2017 in order to take advantage of his nomination to Awtaad, on whom he had won the 2016 Irish 2,000 Guineas for Prendergast.

== Major wins ==
(Republic of Ireland) Ireland

- Flying Five Stakes - (2) - Sole Power (2015), Romantic Proposal (2021)
- Irish 1,000 Guineas - (2) - Homeless Songs (2022), Tahiyra (2023)
- Irish 2,000 Guineas - (1) - Awtaad (2016)
- Irish St. Leger - (2) - Voleuse de Coeurs (2013), Search For A Song (2019)
- Matron Stakes - (2) - La Collina (2013), Tahiyra (2023)
- Moyglare Stud Stakes - (1) - Tahiyra (2022)

(United Kingdom) Great Britain

- Coronation Stakes - (1) - Tahiyra (2023)
- Epsom Oaks - (1) - Ezeliya (2024)
