= Donnacha O'Brien =

Irish flat racing jockey and horse trainer

Donnacha O'Brien (born 22 July 1998) is an Irish racehorse trainer and former jockey who competed in Flat racing.

O'Brien is the son of multiple champion trainer Aidan O'Brien and brother of jockey and trainer Joseph O'Brien. Donnacha O'Brien rode his first winner on Quartz, trained by his father, at Dundalk Stadium in September 2014, and gained his first Group 1 victory when he rode Intricately to win the 2016 Moyglare Stud Stakes. Intricately was bred by his mother, Anne Marie, and trained by his brother. O'Brien was Irish flat racing champion apprentice jockey in 2016 and Irish flat racing Champion Jockey for the first time in 2018. He retained his title in 2019, beating Colin Keane in a season which saw two jockeys ride over 100 winners in a season in Ireland for the first time.

O'Brien announced his retirement from race riding on 25 November 2019 and announced his intention to take up training.

== Major wins as a jockey ==
(Republic of Ireland) Ireland

- Irish Derby - (1) - Latrobe (2018)
- Moyglare Stud Stakes - (2) - Intricately (2016), Happily (2017)

(United Kingdom) Great Britain

- 2000 Guineas - (2) - Saxon Warrior (2018), Magna Grecia (2019)
- Cheveley Park Stakes - Fairyland (2018)
- Epsom Oaks - Forever Together (2018)
- Middle Park Stakes - Ten Sovereigns (2018)
- Vertem Futurity Trophy - Magna Grecia (2018)

== Major wins as a trainer ==
(Republic of Ireland) Ireland

- Flying Five Stakes - (1) - Comanche Brave (2026)
- Matron Stakes - (1) - Porta Fortuna (2024)
- Moyglare Stud Stakes - (1) - Shale (2020)

(United Kingdom) Great Britain

- Cheveley Park Stakes - (1) - Porta Fortuna (2023)
- Coronation Stakes - (1) - Porta Fortuna (2024)
- Falmouth Stakes - (1) Porta Fortuna (2024)
- July Cup - (1) Comanche Brave (2026)
- Nassau Stakes – (1) - Fancy Blue (2020)

France

- Critérium International - (1) - Proud and Regal (2022)
- Prix de Diane – (1) - Fancy Blue (2020)

United States

- Belmont Oaks - (1) - Kensington Lane (2026)
- Breeders' Cup Juvenile Fillies Turf - (1) - Balantina (2025)
