= Billy Lee (jockey) =

Irish jockey

Personal information
- Born: July 1986 (age 40) Ballingarry, County Limerick
- Occupation: Jockey

Horse racing career
- Sport: Horse racing

Major racing wins
- Matron Stakes (2014, 2022); Prix Jacques Le Marois (2019); Pretty Polly Stakes (Ireland) (2022)

Racing awards
- Irish flat racing Champion Jockey (2026)

Significant horses
- Fiesolana; Romanised; La Petite Coco

William James Lee (born July 1986) is a Group 1 winning Irish jockey who competes in flat racing. On 1 November 2026 he was crowned Irish flat racing Champion Jockey.

== Background ==
Lee grew up on a farm in Ballingarry, County Limerick, where the family kept horses and his mother trained point-to-pointers. His sisters also went into training horses. Lee competed in pony racing from the age of nine and also entered the Castletown Donkey Derby on several occasions, coming second in 1994. A video of the race was uploaded onto YouTube in 2011 and had been viewed more than 1.3 million times by 2022. Lee started riding out for Tommy Stack in school holidays and was apprenticed to the yard when he left school in 2002.

== Career ==
Lee rode his first winner aged sixteen when Zeno, trained by Stack, won at Sligo in August 2002. Before concentrating on the flat, he occasionally rode over hurdles for Stack, winning a Listed race at Haydock on Wanango in 2005. His first Group win came on Pollen, trained by Stack, in the Group 3 Park Express Stakes at the Curragh in March 2010. In 2013, he struck up a successful partnership with the Willie McCreery trained Fiesolana, winning the Group 3 Brownstown Stakes at Fairyhouse, the Group 3 Fairy Bridge Stakes at Tipperary and the Group 2 Challenge Stakes at Newmarket. The following season Fiesolana provided Lee with his first Group 1 victory when she won the Matron Stakes at Leopardstown.

Lee had a particularly successful year in 2022, when he rode 97 winners in Ireland and came a close second to Colin Keane in the Irish championship. His seven Group wins in 2022 included two at the highest level: the Pretty Polly Stakes on La Petite Coco and the Matron Stakes on Pearls Galore, both trained by Paddy Twomey. He was again in second place behind Colin Keane in 2023 and 2024, but dropped back to sixth place in 2025 after spending two months on the sidelines with a broken collarbone. In September 2025, he rode his 1,000th Irish winner.

On 1 November 2026, Lee was crowned champion Irish flat racing jockey at the Curragh, having ridden 99 winners in the season. The previous day he had ridden Jancis into third place in the Breeders' Cup Filly & Mare Turf at Keeneland before catching a plane back to Ireland to ride at the Curragh and collect his trophy.

== Personal life ==
Lee married Catriona Mac Nabb in November 2020. The couple have two daughters.

== Major wins ==
(Republic of Ireland) Ireland

- Flying Five Stakes - (1) Moss Tucker (2023)
- Matron Stakes - (2) - Fiesolana (2014), Pearls Galore (2022)
- Pretty Polly Stakes - (1) - La Petite Coco (2022)

France

- Prix Jacques Le Marois - (1) - Romanised (2019)
