= Colin Keane =

Irish jockey

Personal information
- Born: 12 September 1994 (age 32) County Meath
- Occupation: Jockey

Horse racing career
- Sport: Horse racing

Major racing wins
- Irish Classic Races: Irish 2,000 Guineas (2020, 2025); Irish Oaks (2020); Irish Derby (2022); Other major races: Flying Five Stakes (2016); Grand Prix de Saint-Cloud (2021); International Stakes (2020); Matron Stakes (2020); Phoenix Stakes (2019); Tattersalls Gold Cup (2021); Breeders' Cup Turf (2020); St James's Palace Stakes (2025)

Racing awards
- Irish flat racing Champion Jockey (2017, 2020, 2021, 2022)

Significant horses
- Broome, Champers Elysees, Even So, Helvic Dream, Siskin, Westover,
- Updated on 28 January 2022

Colin Keane (born 12 September 1994) is an Irish jockey who competes in flat racing. He was Irish flat racing Champion Jockey in 2017, 2020, 2021, 2022, 2023 and 2024.

Keane was born in County Meath and rode his first race winner at Dundalk in December 2010. He became stable jockey for racehorse trainer Ger Lyons in 2014 and won the Irish apprentice jockeys' championship that year with 54 winners, having finished runner-up the previous season. Keane was runner-up to Pat Smullen in the Irish jockeys' championship in 2015 and won his first championship in 2017 with a total of 100 winners. In 2019 he was runner-up in the championship to Donnacha O'Brien, with 103 winners to O'Brien's 111; this was the first season in which two jockeys both rode 100 winners in an Irish season. Keane won his second Irish champion jockeys' title in 2020 with 100 winners, ahead of Shane Foley who finished with 92 wins. Foley had led by 20 winners on 20 August but a run of success for Keane during September and October put him back in the lead and he maintained his advantage to the end of the season. In 2021 Keane achieved the fastest century of winners in an Irish flat jockeys' championship, riding his 100th winner on 28 August to beat the record set by Joseph O'Brien in 2013.

Juddmonte Farms announced in June 2025 that it had retained Keane as its principal rider in Great Britain, Ireland, and France.

== Major wins ==
France

- Grand Prix de Saint-Cloud - (1) - Broome (2021)
- Prix Rothschild - (1) - Blue Bolt (2026)
- Prix Jean-Luc Lagardère - (1) - Amusingly (2026)

(United Kingdom) Great Britain

- British Champions Fillies and Mares Stakes - (1) - Kalpana (2025)
- Falmouth Stakes - (1) - Blue Bolt (2026)
- International Stakes -(1) Item (2026)
- King George VI and Queen Elizabeth Stakes - (1) - Kalpana (2026)
- St James's Palace Stakes - (1) - Field of Gold (2025)
- Sun Chariot Stakes - (2) - Tamfana (2024), Blue Bolt (2026)
- Yorkshire Oaks -(1) Kalpana (2026)
- Champion Bumper - (1) - The Mourne Rambler (2026)

(Republic of Ireland) Ireland

- Irish Derby - (1) - Westover (2022)
- Irish 2,000 Guineas - (2) - Siskin (2020), Field Of Gold (2025)
- Irish Oaks - (1) - Even So (2020)
- Matron Stakes - (2) - Champers Elysees (2020), Blue Bolt (2026)
- Phoenix Stakes - (2) - Siskin (2019), Babouche (2024)
- Tattersalls Gold Cup - (2) - Helvic Dream (2021), White Birch (2024)
- Flying Five Stakes - (1) - Ardhoomey (2016)

Italy

- Premio Lydia Tesio - (1) - Laganore (2017)

United States

- Breeders' Cup Juvenile Turf Sprint - (1) - Magnum Force (2024)
- Breeders' Cup Turf - (1) - Tarnawa (2020)
