= Declan McDonogh =

Irish jockey

Declan McDonogh (born 21 January 1980) in County Meath is an Irish jockey who competes in Flat racing. McDonogh rode his first winner at Leopardstown Racecourse in June 1995 and has worked for trainers Kevin Prendergast, John Oxx and Joseph O'Brien . He was Irish flat racing Champion Jockey in the 2006 season.

== Major wins ==
(Republic of Ireland) Ireland

- Phoenix Stakes - (1) - La Collina (2011)
- Pretty Polly Stakes - (2) - Polaire (1999), Rebelline (2001)
- Tattersalls Gold Cup - (1) - Rebelline (2002)
- Vincent O'Brien National Stakes - (2) - Kingsfort (2009), Thunder Moon (2020)

France

- Prix de l'Abbaye de Longchamp - (1) - Maarek (2013)
