= La Collina =

Irish-bred Thoroughbred racehorse

- Sire: Strategic Prince
- Grandsire: Dansili
- Dam: Starfish
- Damsire: Galileo
- Sex: Mare
- Foaled: 24 April 2009
- Country: Ireland
- Colour: Chestnut
- Breeder: Manister House Stud
- Owner: Joerg Vasicek
- Trainer: Kevin Prendergast
- Record: 16: 3-3-2
- Earnings: £288,845

Major wins
- Phoenix Stakes (2011); Matron Stakes (2013)

La Collina (foaled 24 April 2009) is an Irish Thoroughbred racehorse and broodmare. As a two-year-old in 2011 she won a minor race on her debut and went on to record a 33/1 upset win over a strong field in the Phoenix Stakes. She failed to win in eleven races over the next two years before springing another surprise when taking the 2013 Matron Stakes at odds of 25/1. Apart from her wins, she was placed in the Moyglare Stud Stakes, Silver Flash Stakes, Blue Wind Stakes, Gladness Stakes and Abu Dhabi Stakes.

== Background ==
La Collina is a chestnut mare with a narrow white blaze bred in Ireland by the County Limerick-based Manister House Stud. As a yearling the filly was consigned to the Goffs sale at Doncaster in August 2010 and was bought for £42,000 by the veteran trainer Kevin Prendergast. She entered the ownership of Joerg Vasicek and was taken into training with Prendergast at Friarstown, County Kildare.

She was from the first crop of foals sired by Strategic Prince who won the July Stakes and the Vintage Stakes as a juvenile in 2006. His other offspring included Roca Rojo (Churchill Distaff Turf Mile Stakes) and Super Chic (Italian Derby). La Collina's dam Starfish never ran in a race but was a great-granddaughter of the Irish mare Sorbus whose other descendants have included Oasis Dream, Zenda and Kingman.

== Racing career ==
=== 2011: two-year-old season ===
In her first two seasons La Collina was ridden in all of her races by Declan McDonogh. The filly began her track career in a maiden race over seven furlongs at Limerick Racecourse on 11 June. Starting the 9/4 favourite in an eleven-runner field she was restrained towards the rear of the field before making a forward move in the straight. Despite hanging to the right (towards the inside rail) she took the lead inside the final furlong and won by one and three quarter lengths from the Dermot Weld-trained Mahaazen. In the following month the filly was stepped up sharply in class to contest the Group 3 Silver Flash Stakes over the same distance at Leopardstown Racecourse. Starting at odds of 10/1 in a six-runner field she made steady progress in the straight but failed by a neck to overhaul the Aidan O'Brien-trained favourite Maybe.

On 7 August at the Curragh La Collina was matched against male opponents in the Group 1 Phoenix Stakes over six furlongs and started a 33/1 outsider. Power started favourite while the other seven runners included Parish Hall, Frederick Engels (July Stakes) and Lilbourne Lad (Railway Stakes). After racing towards the rear of the field the filly was switched to the outside to make her challenge in the straight. She entered the final furlong in fourth place and maintained her run to catch Power in the final strides to win by a neck. McDonogh commented "They went hard and there was a bit of traffic at half-way. I just got out and was lucky with the clear run I got. I never got stopped. I just had to switch a couple of times... I got outpaced early and let her find her feet. She's a very good two-year-old and that was a true test. She's all heart". Kevin Prendergast said "She's got a good turn of foot, a great temperament and has been working well".

Three weeks after her win in the Phoenix Stakes, La Collina faced a rematch with Maybe in the Moyglare Stud Stakes over seven furlongs at the same track. After settling in fourth place she made steady progress but never looked likely to win and finished third behind Maybe and Fire Lily.

=== 2012: three-year-old season ===
On her three-year-old debut La Collina was sent to England to contest the 1000 Guineas over the Rowley mile at Newmarket Racecourse on 6 May and finished fifth behind Homecoming Queen, Starscope, Maybe and The Fugue. In the Irish 1,000 Guineas three weeks later she raced in second place for most of the way but faded in the closing stages and came home sixth of the eight runners behind Samitar. After a three-month break the filly came back in the Group 3 Lanwades Stud Fillies' Stakes and finished third to the O'Brien-trained Up. La Collina returned to the highest class for her last two starts of the year: she ran a close fifth to Chachamaidee in the Matron Stakes and fourth to Siyouma in the Sun Chariot Stakes.

=== 2013: four-year-old season ===
On her first run as a four-year-old La Collina was beaten only half a length when finishing third to the colts Custom Cut and Nephrite in the Group 3 Gladness Stakes at the Curragh on 7 April. Following this race Chris Hayes took over from McDonogh as her regular jockey. In May La Collina contested two Group 3 races, taking second place in both the Blue Wind Stakes at Naas and the Abu Dhabi Stakes at the Curragh. In the Pretty Polly Stakes at the Curragh in June she finished sixth of nine runners behind the British-trained Ambivalent and her losing run extended to 11 in the following month when she came home a distant sixth (beaten more than 20 lengths) to Scintillula in the Meld Stakes on heavy ground at Leopardstown.

Two years and one month after her last victory, La Collina started a 25/1 outsider for the Matron Stakes at Leopardstown on 7 September. The French-trained Kenhope (Prix de la Grotte) started favourite while the other ten runners included Fiesolana (Fairy Bridge Stakes), Chigun (Abu Dhabi Stakes), Caponata (Victor McCalmont Memorial Stakes), Say (Dance Design Stakes), Just Pretending (Derrinstown Stud 1,000 Guineas Trial), Scintillula, Wannabe Better (Ruby Stakes), Lily's Angel (Chartwell Fillies' Stakes) and Magical Dream (C L Weld Park Stakes). La Collina raced towards the rear of the field but made steady progress in the last quarter mile and was in fourth place when Hayes switched her to the outside approaching the final furlong. The filly produced a strong late run, gained the advantage in the final strides, and won by half a length and a short head from Lily's Angel and Say. Hayes, who was winning his first Group 1 race said "She just coasted around. It's just unbelievable. She has been in great form and I am glad that the owners and trainer stuck by me", while Prendergast commented "She's very genuine and everything went right for her today. She's only run one bad race and that was last time here when the ground was heavy."

On her final racecourse appearance, La Collina ran for the second time in the Sun Chariot Stakes and finished fifth behind Sky Lantern.

== Breeding record ==
After her retirement from racing La Collina became a broodmare at her owner's Kenilworth House Stud in County Tipperary.

Her first foal, a bay filly sired by Dubawi, was born in January 2015 and fetched 625,000 guineas as a yearling. Named Piccola Collina, she finished seventh on her debut in July 2017. La Collina's second foal was a chestnut filly by Shamardal. She produced a bay colt by Oasis Dream in 2017 and was then covered by Dark Angel.

== Pedigree ==
Pedigree of La Collina (IRE), chestnut mare, 2009
Sire Strategic Prince (GB) 2004	Dansili (GB); 1996	Danehill	Danzig
Sire Strategic Prince (GB) 2004	Dansili (GB); 1996	Danehill	Razyana
Sire Strategic Prince (GB) 2004	Dansili (GB); 1996	Hasili	Kahyasi
Sire Strategic Prince (GB) 2004	Dansili (GB); 1996	Hasili	Kerali
Sire Strategic Prince (GB) 2004	Ausherra (USA); 1988	Diesis	Sharpen Up
Sire Strategic Prince (GB) 2004	Ausherra (USA); 1988	Diesis	Doubly Sure
Sire Strategic Prince (GB) 2004	Ausherra (USA); 1988	Princess of Man	Green God
Sire Strategic Prince (GB) 2004	Ausherra (USA); 1988	Princess of Man	White Legs
Dam Starfish (IRE) 2003	Galileo (IRE); 1998	Sadler's Wells	Northern Dancer
Dam Starfish (IRE) 2003	Galileo (IRE); 1998	Sadler's Wells	Fairy Bridge
Dam Starfish (IRE) 2003	Galileo (IRE); 1998	Urban Sea	Miswaki
Dam Starfish (IRE) 2003	Galileo (IRE); 1998	Urban Sea	Allegretta
Dam Starfish (IRE) 2003	Silver Skates (IRE); 1998	Slip Anchor	Shirley Heights
Dam Starfish (IRE) 2003	Silver Skates (IRE); 1998	Slip Anchor	Sayonara
Dam Starfish (IRE) 2003	Silver Skates (IRE); 1998	Klarifi	Habitat
Dam Starfish (IRE) 2003	Silver Skates (IRE); 1998	Klarifi	Sorbus (Family: 19)
