= La Petite Coco =

Irish Thoroughbred racehorse

- Sire: Ruler of the World
- Grandsire: Galileo
- Dam: La Petite Virginia
- Damsire: Konigstiger
- Sex: Filly
- Foaled: 13 January 2018
- Country: Ireland
- Colour: Bay
- Breeder: Bernd Schone
- Owner: Ute Schone; Team Valor
- Trainer: Andrew Kinirons; Paddy Twomey
- Record: 8: 5-1-0
- Earnings: £304,534

Major wins
- Give Thanks Stakes (2021); Blandford Stakes (2021); Pretty Polly Stakes (2022)

La Petite Coco (foaled 13 January 2018) is an Irish Thoroughbred racehorse. She finished sixth on her only appearance as a juvenile in 2020 but made good progress in the following year, winning minor races in May and July and going on to take the Give Thanks Stakes and the Blandford Stakes. On her first run as a four-year-old she won the Group 1 Pretty Polly Stakes.

== Background ==
La Petite Coco is a bay mare with a white blaze bred in Ireland by Bernd and Ute Schone who are based near Rhode, County Offaly. She initially raced in the colours of Ute Schone and was sent into training with Andrew Kinirons at Newbridge, County Kildare. She has been ridden in most of her races by Billy Lee

She was from the third crop of foals sired by the Epsom Derby winner Ruler of the World. La Petite Coco's dam La Petite Virginia was orphaned as a foal and was considered too weak to race, but was a half-sister to several winners including Laveron (Grande Course de Haies d'Auteuil) and Lavirco (Deutsches Derby, Preis von Europa). She was a granddaughter of Love In, a British-bred broodmare who was the ancestor of many other top performers in Germany including Lirung (Prix Jacques le Marois), Lomitas (Grosser Preis von Baden) and Lagunas (Deutsches Derby).

== Racing career ==
=== 2020: two-year-old season ===
La Petite Coco began her track career in a maiden race over one mile on heavy ground at the Curragh on 6 November when she started a 50/1 outsider in a sixteen-runner field. She recovered from a slow start to stay on well in the last two furlongs and finished sixth behind Cecelia Clementine, beaten three lengths by the winner.

=== 2021: three-year-old season ===
On her first run as a three-year-old La Petite Coco started at odds of 18/1 for a one-mile maiden at Naas Racecourse on 26 March and after struggling to obtain a clear run in the last quarter mile she finished strongly to finish fourth of the Aidan O'Brien-trained Empress Josephine. After the race she was bought privately by Team Valor and transferred to the stable of Paddy Twomey at Cashel, County Tipperary. On her first appearance for her new connections the filly started 11/8 favourite for a maiden over one mile at Killarney Racecourse on 11 May and recorded her first success as she was among the leaders from the start, gained a clear advantage approaching the last quarter mile and won by four and a half lengths from Belle Image.

For her next start, La Petite Coco was moved up in class and distance and started favourite for the Listed Naas Oaks Trial over ten furlongs on 23 June but was beaten half a length into second place by Willow. On 12 July the filly went off the 4/9 favourite for a minor race over eleven furlongs at Killarney and won "comfortably" by two and a quarter lengths from the four-year-old gelding Kalapour after leading from the start. In the Group 3 Give Thanks Stakes over one and half miles at Cork Racecourse on 7 August La Petite Coco started the 2/1 favourite in a ten-runner field which also included Willow and the Munster Oaks winner Thunder Kiss. After tracking the leaders she went to the front quarter mile and went clear of the field to win "easily" by five and a half lengths. After the race Paddy Twomey said "She's progressed with every run this year... She looks like she has every chance that she might go to the top" and mentioned the E P Taylor Stakes and British Champions Fillies & Mares Stakes as possible future targets.

On 12 September La Petite Coco was stepped up to Group 2 class for the Blandford Stakes over ten furlongs at the Curragh and started the 3.2/1 second choice in the betting behind Love in an eight-runner field which also included Thundering Nights and the 2020 race winner Cayenne Pepper. After racing in mid-division she moved into second place behind Love two furlongs from the finish and stayed on strongly to run down the favourite in the final strides and win by a short head. Twomey explained that he had not expected Love, multiple Group 1 winner, to be in the race and commented "My office is the tractor and I was sitting looking at the phone on Friday morning scratching my head when I saw Love declared. I didn't expect to see her and there might have been an expletive! When I make a plan I tend to stick to it and wasn't going to waver. Team Valor's Barry Irwin was quite cross with me when he saw Love declared. I got a lecture about what I was thinking, but I told him I thought she was good enough."

=== 2022: four-year-old season ===
On 26 June 2022, after an absence of more than nine months, La Petite Coco returned to the track in the Group 1 Pretty Polly Stakes over ten furlongs at the Curragh and started at odds of 9/1 in an eight-runner field. The British-trained My Astra (Rothesay Stakes) started favourite while the other contenders included Dreamloper, Thunder Kiss, Concert Hall (Weld Park Stakes), Purplepay (Prix de Sandringham), Rosscarbery (Munster Oaks) and Tranquil Lady (Blue Wind Stakes). La Petite Coco started quickly and settled behind the leaders as Lyrical Poetry set the pace and went to the front approaching the final furlong. She was strongly challenged by My Astra in the closing stages but held on to win by half a length. Her stablemate Rosscarberry finished third but was disqualified for carrying the incorrect weight. After the race Twomey, who was winning his first race at the highest level, said: "I couldn't see her being beaten coming here, given the level she showed last year. I didn't enter her in the Prix de l'Arc de Triomphe for fun. I think she's top-class. We decided to start her campaign in the middle of the year with a view to the second half. She didn't have a run beforehand, but I don't think that matters with her... we were keen to start at home. We didn't want to travel for her first run."

== Pedigree ==
Pedigree of La Petite Coco (IRE), bay filly, 2018
Sire Ruler of the World (IRE) 2010	Galileo (IRE); 1998	Sadler's Wells (USA)	Northern Dancer (CAN)
Sire Ruler of the World (IRE) 2010	Galileo (IRE); 1998	Sadler's Wells (USA)	Fairy Bridge
Sire Ruler of the World (IRE) 2010	Galileo (IRE); 1998	Urban Sea (USA)	Miswaki
Sire Ruler of the World (IRE) 2010	Galileo (IRE); 1998	Urban Sea (USA)	Allegretta (GB)
Sire Ruler of the World (IRE) 2010	Love Me True (USA); 1998	Kingmambo	Mr Prospector
Sire Ruler of the World (IRE) 2010	Love Me True (USA); 1998	Kingmambo	Miesque
Sire Ruler of the World (IRE) 2010	Love Me True (USA); 1998	Lassie's Lady	Alydar
Sire Ruler of the World (IRE) 2010	Love Me True (USA); 1998	Lassie's Lady	Lassie Dear
Dam La Petite Virginia (GER) 2009	Konigstiger (GER); 2002	Tiger Hill (IRE)	Danehill (USA)
Dam La Petite Virginia (GER) 2009	Konigstiger (GER); 2002	Tiger Hill (IRE)	The Filly (GER)
Dam La Petite Virginia (GER) 2009	Konigstiger (GER); 2002	Kittiwake (GB)	Barathea (IRE)
Dam La Petite Virginia (GER) 2009	Konigstiger (GER); 2002	Kittiwake (GB)	Gull Nook
Dam La Petite Virginia (GER) 2009	Virginia (GER); 1988	Surumu	Literat
Dam La Petite Virginia (GER) 2009	Virginia (GER); 1988	Surumu	Surama
Dam La Petite Virginia (GER) 2009	Virginia (GER); 1988	La Dorada (IRE)	Kronzeuge (FR)
Dam La Petite Virginia (GER) 2009	Virginia (GER); 1988	La Dorada (IRE)	Love In (GB) (Family: 9-e)
