= Orby Stakes =

Flat horse race in Ireland

Orby Stakes
2026
Purview	Trustyourinstinct	Arouet

Previous years
2025
Trustyourinstinct	Romzina	Magical Hope
2024
Candleford	Sumiha	Starry Heavens
2023
Mashhoor	Annerville	Ottilien
2022
Raise You	Okita Soushi	Wordsworth
2021
Reve De Vol	Patrick Sarsfield	O'reilly

2020-2011
2020
Bolleville	Simsir	Keats
2019
Guaranteed	Riven Light	Old Glory
2018
I'm So Fancy	Mustajeer	Sizzling
2017
Glamorous Approach	Laganore	Reckless Gold
2016
Portage	Chemical Charge	Sir Isaac Newton
2015
Postulation	Parish Hall	Manndawi
2014
Indigo Lady	Castle Guest	Qewy
2013
Trading Leather	Lines of Battle	Kingston Jamaica
2012
Sharestan	Defining Year	Sweet Lightning
2011
Viscount Nelson	Bob Le Beau	Waydownsouth

2010-2003
2010
Carraiglawn	Choose Me	Harriers Call
2009
Deauville Vision	She's Our Mark	Dance Pass
2008
Hindu Kush	Winchester	Lisvale
2007
Fracas	Trinity College	Arch Rebel
2006
Heliostatic	Cougar Bay	Reform Act
2005
Chelsea Rose	Merger	Napper Tandy
2004
Medicinal	Grand Passion	Cobra
2003
Tipperary All Star	Good Day Too	Multazem

The Orby Stakes is a Listed flat horse race in Ireland open to thoroughbreds aged three years or older. It is run over a distance of 1 mile and 2 furlongs (2,012 metres) at the Curragh in June.

The race was first run in 1991 as the Hotel Conrad Silver Race. The race was run at Leopardstown in 2004 and 2005. The title was changed to the Orby Stakes from the 2021 running and commemorates Orby, the first Irish-trained horse to win the Epsom Derby.

== Records ==
Leading jockey (5 wins):

- Kevin Manning – Ballykett Nancy (1994), Identify (1996), Carraiglawn (2010), Trading Leather (2013), Glamorous Approach (2017)

Leading trainer (7 wins):

- Jim Bolger – Ballykett Nancy (1994), Identify (1996), Heliostatic (2006), Carraiglawn (2010), Trading Leather (2013), Glamorous Approach (2017), Guaranteed (2019)

== Winners ==
Year	Winner	Age	Jockey	Trainer	Time
1991	Sportsworld	3	Lester Piggott	Vincent O'Brien	2:08.30
1992	Ormsby	3	Michael Kinane	Dermot Weld	2:07.00
1993	Hushang	3	Michael Kinane	John Oxx	2:09.40
1994	Ballykett Nancy	3	Kevin Manning	Jim Bolger	2:20.40
1995	Definite Article	3	Michael Kinane	Dermot Weld	2:09.50
1996	Identify	3	Kevin Manning	Jim Bolger	2:08.90
1997	Dr Johnson	3	Johnny Murtagh	Charles O'Brien	2:05.90
1998	Risk Material	3	Seamie Heffernan	Aidan O'Brien	1:57.20
1999	Apparatchik	3	Johnny Murtagh	John Oxx	2:09.40
2000	Jammaal	3	Pat Smullen	Dermot Weld	2:12.80
2001	Pugin	3	Johnny Murtagh	John Oxx	2:10.70
2002	Smuggler's Song	3	Fran Berry	Charles O'Brien	2:18.10
2003	Tipperary All Star	3	Tadg O'Shea	Michael Halford	2:13.30
2004	Medicinal	3	Pat Smullen	Dermot Weld	2:03.00
2005	Chelsea Rose	3	Pat Shanahan	Con Collins	2:04.00
2006	Heliostatic	3	David Moran	Jim Bolger	2:08.52
2007	Fracas	5	Wayne Lordan	David Wachman	2:06.60
2008	Hindu Kush	3	Sean Levey	Aidan O'Brien	2:07.17
2009	Deauville Vision	6	Rory Cleary	Michael Halford	2:18.03
2010	Carraiglawn	3	Kevin Manning	Jim Bolger	2:05.73
2011	Viscount Nelson	4	Colm O'Donoghue	Aidan O'Brien	2:08.99
2012	Sharestan	4	Niall McCullagh	John Oxx	2:13.37
2013	Trading Leather	3	Kevin Manning	Jim Bolger	2:05.34
2014	Indigo Lady	4	Seamie Heffernan	Willie McCreery	2:11.95
2015	Postulation	3	Pat Smullen	Dermot Weld	2:06.66
2016	Portage	4	Shane Foley	Michael Halford	2:08.25
2017	Glamorous Approach	4	Kevin Manning	Jim Bolger	2:11.44
2018	I'm So Fancy	4	Colm O'Donoghue	Jessica Harrington	2:06.51
2019	Guaranteed	3	Ronan Whelan	Jim Bolger	2:11.86
2020	Bolleville (Note: The 2020 race was run at Leopardstown in July due to the COVID-19 pandemic in the Republic of Ireland)	4	Shane Crosse	Joseph O'Brien	2:13.32
2021	Reve De Vol	3	Colin Keane	Ger Lyons	2:12.19
2022	Raise You	6	Shane Crosse	Joseph O'Brien	2:36.24
2023	Mashoor	5	Ben Coen	Johnny Murtagh	2:38.27
2024	Candleford	6	Ryan Moore	William Haggas	2:32.55
2025	Trustyourinstinct	5	Dylan Browne McMonagle	Joseph O'Brien	2:29.08
2026	Purview	4	Colin Keane	Dermot Weld	2:30.55

== See also ==
- Horse racing in Ireland
- List of Irish flat horse races
