= 2015 1000 Guineas =

202nd 1000 Guineas Stakes
- 1000 Guineas
- Location: Newmarket Racecourse
- Date: 3 May 2015
- Winning horse: Legatissimo (IRE)
- Jockey: Ryan Moore
- Trainer: David Wachman (IRE)
- Owner: Michael Tabor, Derrick Smith & Mrs John Magnier

The 2015 1000 Guineas Stakes was a horse race held at Newmarket Racecourse on Sunday 3 May 2015. It was the 202nd running of the 1000 Guineas.

The winner was Susan Magnier, Michael Tabor and Derrick Smith's Legatissimo, a British-bred bay filly trained in County Tipperary, Ireland by David Wachman and ridden by Ryan Moore. Legatissimo's victory was the first in the race for Wachman, the second for Moore and the third for the Magnier/Tabor/Smith partnership.

== The contenders ==
The race attracted a field of thirteen runners, nine trained in the United Kingdom and four in Ireland: there were no challengers from continental Europe. Following the withdrawal of the ante-post favourite Found, the leading Irish contender was the Jim Bolger-trained Lucida, who had won the Rockfel Stakes in 2014 whilst the Aidan O'Brien stable was represented by the C. L. Weld Park Stakes winner Qualify. The County Tipperary stable of David Wachmann had two runners, Legatissimo (winner of a Listed race on her most recent appearance) and Queen Nefertiti. The British runners included Tiggy Wiggy who had been named the Champion Two-year-old Filly after wins in the Weatherbys Super Sprint, Lowther Stakes and Cheveley Park Stakes. The lightly-raced pair Redstart and Jellicle Ball, who had finished first and second ahead of Tiggy Wiggy in the Fred Darling Stakes were also in the field. The other runners included Fadhayyil (runner-up in the Rockfel Stakes), Osaila (Nell Gwyn Stakes), Malabar (Prestige Stakes) and the Godolphin representative Local Time, who had won her last six races including the UAE 1000 Guineas and the UAE Oaks. The field was completed by the Listed race winners Irish Rookie (Montrose Stakes) and Terror (Bosra Sham Stakes).

Lucida headed the betting at odds of 9/2 ahead of Legatissimo (13/2) with Fadhayyil and Jellicle Ball on 7/1. Next in the market were Osaila (15/2), Tiggy Wiggy (9/1) and Malabar (11/1).

== The race ==
Redstart broke quickly and set the pace along the stands side from Tiggy Wigqy who raced in the centre of the course before moving over to join the main group. Local Time and Queen Nefertiti and were among the leaders whilst Lucida and Legatissimo were towards the rear. Two furlongs out, as the fillies reached the cut-away, the race appeared to be wide-open, with all thirteen runners closely grouped. Lucida made rapid progress on the outside and overtook Tiggy Wiggy to take the lead approaching the final furlong, but Legatissimo quickly emerged as a serious challenger. The two Irish fillies drew away from the other runners, with Legatissimo prevailing by three quarters of a length. There was a gap of four and a half lengths back to Tiggy Wiggy who took third ahead of Malabar and Fadhayyil. The winning time of 1:34.60 was the second fastest in the history of the race and almost a second faster than Gleneagles ran in the 2000 Guineas on the same course a day earlier.

== Race details ==
- Sponsor: QIPCO
- First prize: £232,511
- Surface: Turf
- Going: Good to Firm
- Distance: 8 furlongs
- Number of runners: 13
- Winner's time:1:34.60

== Full result ==
Pos.	Marg.	Horse (bred)	Jockey	Trainer (Country)	Odds
1		Legatissimo (GB)	Ryan Moore	David Wachman (IRE)	13/2
2	¾	Lucida (IRE)	Kevin Manning	Jim Bolger (IRE)	9/2 fav
3	4½	Tiggy Wiggy (IRE)	Richard Hughes	Richard Hannon Jr. (GB)	9/1
4	1¼	Malabar (GB)	Martin Harley	Mick Channon (GB)	11/1
5	½	Fadhayyil (IRE)	Paul Hanagan	Barry Hills (GB)	7/1
6	1	Irish Rookie (IRE)	Fergus Sweeney	Martyn Meade (GB)	20/1
7	3	Osaila (IRE)	Frankie Dettori	Richard Hannon Jr. (GB)	15/2
8	1	Queen Nefertiti (IRE)	Wayne Lordan	David Wachman (IRE)	25/1
9	1	Terror (IRE)	Andrea Atzeni	David Simcock (GB)	25/1
10	7	Local Time (GB)	James Doyle	Saeed bin Suroor (GB)	16/1
11	10	Redstart (GB)	Pat Dobbs	Ralph Beckett (GB)	16/1
12	10	Jellicle Ball (IRE)	William Buick	John Gosden (GB)	7/1
13	¾	Qualify (IRE)	Joseph O'Brien	Aidan O'Brien (IRE)	12/1

- Abbreviations: nse = nose; nk = neck; shd = head; hd = head; dist = distance; UR = unseated rider; DSQ = disqualified; PU = pulled up

== Winner's details ==
Further details of the winner, Legatissimo

- Foaled: 22 April 2012
- Country: United Kingdom
- Sire: Danehill Dancer; Dam: Yummy Mummy (Montjeu)
- Owner: Michael Tabor, Derrick Smith & Mrs John Magnier
- Breeder: Newsells Park Stud
