= Chelsea Rose =

Irish-bred Thoroughbred racehorse

- Sire: Desert King
- Grandsire: Danehill
- Dam: Cinnamon Rose
- Damsire: Trempolino
- Sex: Mare
- Foaled: 11 February 2002
- Country: Ireland
- Colour: Chestnut
- Breeder: Airlie Stud
- Owner: Frances Donnelly
- Trainer: Con Collins
- Record: 16: 5-3-2
- Earnings: £307,705

Major wins
- Moyglare Stud Stakes (2004); Silver Stakes (2005); Ballyroan Stakes (2005); Dance Design Stakes (2005)

Chelsea Rose (foaled 11 February 2002) is an Irish Thoroughbred racehorse and broodmare. In a track career which lasted from June 2004 until September 2006 she raced in four different countries and won five races over distances ranging from six furlongs to one and a half miles. She showed very promising form as a juvenile in 2004 when she won two of her three races including the Group 1 Moyglare Stud Stakes. In the following year she failed in the Irish Oaks, her principal objective but recorded victories in the Silver Stakes, Ballyroan Stakes and Dance Design Stakes. As a four-year-old in 2006 she failed to win a race but finished second in the Glencairn Stakes, Pretty Polly Stakes and Royal Whip Stakes. After her retirement from racing she became a successful broodmare.

== Background ==
Chelsea Rose is a chestnut mare with a white blaze and a long white sock on her right hind leg bred in Ireland by the County Kildare-based Airlie Stud. As a yearling she was consigned to the Tattersalls sale in October 2003 and was bought for 38,000 guineas by Emerald Bloodstock. The filly entered the ownership of Frances Donnelly and was sent into training with Con Collins at the Curragh. She was ridden in all but two of her races by Pat Shanahan.

She was from the fourth crop of foals sired by Desert King whose wins included the Irish 2,000 Guineas and the Irish Derby in 1997. As breeding stallion he had considerable success in both Europe and Australia, with his offspring including Makybe Diva, Desert War and Mr Dinos Chelsea Rose's dam Cinnamon Rose showed modest racing ability, winning one minor race from nine starts. She was descended from Senones, a full-sister to the Prix du Jockey Club winner Sicambre.

== Racing career ==
=== 2004: two-year-old season ===
On her racecourse debut Chelsea Rose started the 11/2 fourth choice in the betting in a thirteen-runner maiden race over seven furlongs at Leopardstown Racecourse on 9 June. Racing on good to firm ground she headed the Aidan O'Brien-trained favourite Silk And Scarlet a furlong out and won "comfortably" by two lengths. On 8 August the filly was stepped up in class for the Group 2 Debutante Stakes over the same distance at the Curragh but after disputing the lead for most of the way she was overtaken in the closing stages and came home third behind Silk And Scarlet and Luas Line.

Despite her defeat in the Debutante, Chelsea Rose was moved up to Group 1 class for the Moyglare Stud Stakes over the same course and distance on 5 September and started at odds of 9/1 in a twelve-runner field. Silk And Scarlet started favourite, while the other fancied runners included Jewel In The Sand (winner of the Albany Stakes and Cherry Hinton Stakes), Saoire, Slip Dance (Empress Stakes) and the Jim Bolger-trained Pictavia. After racing just behind the leaders as Drama set the pace, Chelsea Rose went to the front two and a half furlongs from the finish and stayed on well to repel several challengers in the closing stages. She crossed the finishing line three quarters of a length in front of Pictavia, with Saoire, Umniya, Belle Artiste and Silk And Scarlet close behind.

Pat Shanahan, who had won the Irish Oaks on the Collins-trained Princess Pati in 1984 said "It's fantastic to ride another group one for Con after all the years we've worked together. My filly traveled really well and as I knew she would stay I decided to kick on almost three (furlongs) down. The ground wasn't ideal for her – she likes a bit of an ease – but it wasn't as fast as it was when she ran here last month and that helped her". Con Collins commented "I thought she had a bit of a chance, but they were good fillies in the race and it was hard to be confident. I thought she would run well, but I didn't back her. I haven't backed one for about three years. The money is so good when you win a race these days, there is no point". Collins' daughter Tracy added "We deliberately didn't enter her in the Guineas because we've always felt anything she did this year would be a bonus. Her career next year will be planned around the Irish Oaks".

=== 2005: three-year-old season ===
Chelsea Rose missed the first part of the 2005 season, and returned to the track in the Silver Stakes over ten furlongs at Lepardstown on 8 June in which she was matched against male opposition and older horses including Sublimity, Solskjaer (Royal Whip Stakes) and Napper Tandy (Diamond Stakes). Carrying a seven-pound weight penalty for her Group 1 win she took the lead in the straight and rallied after being headed by the favourite Merger to regain the advantage and win by a head. In the Pretty Polly Stakes two weeks later she started second favourite but ran poorly and came home ninth of ten runners behind Alexander Goldrun. In the Irish Oaks in July she was moved up in distance but made no impact and finished unplaced in a race won by the French-trained Shawanda.

On 14 August Chelsea Rose was theoretically dropped to Listed class for the Ballyroan Stakes over one and a half miles at Leopardstown and started third choice in the betting behind Shalapour (third in the Irish Derby) and Vinnie Roe. After racing at the rear of the field she moved up on the outside to make her challenge in the straight, by which point Vinnie Roe had gone to the front. Shalapour overtook Vinnie Roe a furlong out, but Chelsea Rose produced a sustained run to take the lead in the closing stages and won by three quarters of a length. Tracey Collins commented "She is very tough and genuine and the horses are only now starting to run well". Three weeks later the filly returned to all-female competition and started 2/1 favourite for the Listed Dance Design Stakes over nine furlongs at the Curragh. She raced in third place before going to the front a furlong and a half from the finish and drew away from her opponents to win "easily" by two lengths from Pictavia.

The Dance Design Stakes proved to be Chelsea Rose's last victory. In the Blandford Stakes at the Curragh September she stayed on in the straight without ever looking likely to win and finished fourth to the British-trained favourite Red Bloom. In October she was sent to Italy and came home third of the nine runners behind Dubai Surprise in the Group 1 Premio Lydia Tesio.

=== 2006: four-year-old season ===
As a four-year-old, Chelsea Rose failed to win in six races but ran well in defeat on several occasions. Ridden by Willie Supple in her first two races, she finished fourth in the Blue Wind Stakes at Naas Racecourse in May, and then failed by a neck to hold off the late challenge of Mustameet in the Listed Glencairn Stakes at Leopardstown. In the Pretty Polly Stakes on 1 July she produced her best effort when she rallied after being headed inside the final furlong but narrowly failed to overhaul the favored Alexander Goldrun. In August she ran for the only time in England and finished fourth to Ouija Board in the Nassau Stakes at Goodwood, before returning to the Curragh to run second to Mustameet when favourite for the Royal Whip Stakes. For her final start Chelsea Rose was sent to France to contest the Prix de Royallieu over 2500 metres at Longchamp Racecourse on 30 September. She reached second place in the straight but then faded and finished seventh of the eight runners.

== Breeding record ==
At the end of her racing career, Chelsea Rose was retired to become a broodmare at the Airlie Stud. In November 2012, the mare was auctioned at the Goffs sale and was bought for €450,000 by the bloodstock agency BBA Ireland. The agency's representative Adrian Nicoll commented "she was the standout mare here today... we know she produces good-looking stock and that's half the battle". She has produced at least seven foals and four winners:

- Hamlool, a bay colt, foaled in 2008, sired by Red Ransom. Failed to win in nine races.
- Pale Orchid, bay filly, 2009, by Invincible Spirit. Won five races.
- Thawaany, chestnut filly, 2010, by Tamayuz. Won four races including Prix de Ris-Orangis.
- Amytis, filly, 2011, by Marju. Unraced.
- Flowers On Venus (previously named Alquds), 2012, chestnut colt (gelded), by Ravens Pass. Won five races.
- Jazz Cat, chestnut filly, 2013, by Tamayuz. Failed to win in four races.
- Kew Gardens, bay colt, 2015, by Galileo. Won Zetland Stakes, Queen's Vase, Grand Prix de Paris and St Leger.

== Pedigree ==
Pedigree of Chelsea Rose, chestnut mare, 2002
Sire Desert King (IRE) 1994	Danehill (USA); 1986	Danzig	Northern Dancer
Sire Desert King (IRE) 1994	Danehill (USA); 1986	Danzig	Pas de Nom
Sire Desert King (IRE) 1994	Danehill (USA); 1986	Razyana	His Majesty
Sire Desert King (IRE) 1994	Danehill (USA); 1986	Razyana	Spring Adieu
Sire Desert King (IRE) 1994	Sabaah (USA); 1988	Nureyev	Northern Dancer
Sire Desert King (IRE) 1994	Sabaah (USA); 1988	Nureyev	Special
Sire Desert King (IRE) 1994	Sabaah (USA); 1988	Dish Dash	Bustino
Sire Desert King (IRE) 1994	Sabaah (USA); 1988	Dish Dash	Loose Cover
Dam Cinnamon Rose (USA) 1994	Trempolino (USA); 1984	Sharpen Up	Atan
Dam Cinnamon Rose (USA) 1994	Trempolino (USA); 1984	Sharpen Up	Rocchetta
Dam Cinnamon Rose (USA) 1994	Trempolino (USA); 1984	Trephine	Viceregal
Dam Cinnamon Rose (USA) 1994	Trempolino (USA); 1984	Trephine	Quiriquina
Dam Cinnamon Rose (USA) 1994	Sweet Simone (FR); 1977	Green Dancer	Nijinsky
Dam Cinnamon Rose (USA) 1994	Sweet Simone (FR); 1977	Green Dancer	Green Valley
Dam Cinnamon Rose (USA) 1994	Sweet Simone (FR); 1977	Servilia	Aureole
Dam Cinnamon Rose (USA) 1994	Sweet Simone (FR); 1977	Servilia	Senones (Family: 7-e)

- Like all of Desert King's offspring, Chelsea Rose was inbred 4 × 4 to Northern Dancer, meaning that this stallion appears twice in the fourth generation of her pedigree.
