= Give Thanks Stakes =

Flat horse race in Ireland

- Class: Group 3
- Location: Cork Racecourse; Mallow; County Cork, Ireland
- Inaugurated: 2003
- Race type: Flat / Thoroughbred
- Sponsor: Irish Stallion Farms
- Website: Cork

Race information
- Distance: 1m 4f (2,414 metres)
- Surface: Turf
- Track: Right-handed
- Qualification: Three-years-old and up fillies & mares
- Weight: 8 st 13 lb (3yo); 9 st 9 lb (4yo+); Penalties; 5 lb for G1 / G2 winners * 3 lb for G3 winners * * since 1 January
- Purse: €65,000 (2022); 1st: €38,350

Give Thanks Stakes
2026
Believed	Amelia Earhart	Caught U Sleeping

Previous years
2025
Elana Osario	Island Hopping	Ameerat Jumaira
2024
Shamida	Mother Nature	Lily Hart
2023
Term Of Endearment	Library	Dancing Tango
2022
Rumbles Of Thunder	Cairde Go Deo	Kiss You Later
2021
La Petite Coco	Thunder Kiss	Federica Sophia

2020-2011
2020
Tarnawa	Cayenne Pepper	Passion
2019
Tarnawa	Simply Beautiful	Delphinia
2018
Sizzling	Kalaxana	Turret Rocks
2017
Eziyra	Bloomfield	Wild Irish Rose
2016
Best In The World	Somehow	Harlequeen
2015
Zannda	Altesse	Easter
2014
Edelmira	Dark Crusader	Shell House
2013
Venus de Milo	Bunairgead	Midnight Soprano
2012
Sapphire	Demurely	Eternal Bounty
2011
Pink Symphony	Haziyna	Amazing Beauty

2010-2003
2010
She's Our Mark	Leo Gali	Zarebiya
2009
Tamarind	Perfect Truth	Beauty O' Gwaun
2008
Unsung Heroine	Hasanka	Arkadina
2007
Downtown	Hasanka	Nick's Nikita
2006
Reform Act	Sina Cova	Souvenance
2005
Mona Lisa	Kastoria	Best Side
2004
My Renee	Tarakala	Kisses For Me
2003
Juliette	Kiteflyer	In The Limelight

The Give Thanks Stakes is a Group 3 flat horse race in Ireland open to thoroughbred fillies and mares aged three years or older. It is run at Cork Racecourse over a distance of 1 mile and 4 furlongs (2,414 metres), and it is scheduled to take place each year in late July or early August.

The event is named after Give Thanks, the winner of the Irish Oaks in 1983. It was established in 2003, and it was initially classed at Listed level. It was promoted to Group 3 status in 2007.

== Records ==
Most successful horse (2 wins):

- Tarnawa - 2019, 2020

Leading jockey (5 wins):

- Pat Smullen - Reform Act (2006), Sapphire (2012), Edelmira (2014), Zannda (2015), Eziyra (2017)

Leading trainer (8 wins):

- Dermot Weld - Reform Act (2006), Sapphire (2012), Edelmira (2014), Zannda (2015), Eziyra (2017), Tarnawa (2019, 2020), Shamida (2024)

== Winners ==
Year	Winner	Age	Jockey	Trainer	Time
2003	Juliette	3	Johnny Murtagh	John Oxx	2:32.60
2004	My Renee	4	Niall McCullagh	Michael Grassick	2:34.70
2005	Mona Lisa	3	Kieren Fallon	Aidan O'Brien	2:33.60
2006	Reform Act	3	Pat Smullen	Dermot Weld	2:31.70
2007	Downtown	3	Seamie Heffernan	David Wachman	2:38.25
2008	Unsung Heroine	3	Wayne Lordan	Tommy Stack	2:35.80
2009	Tamarind	3	Colm O'Donoghue	Aidan O'Brien	2:40.39
2010	She's Our Mark	6	Danny Grant	Pat Flynn	2:36.04
2011	Pink Symphony	4	Joseph O'Brien	David Wachman	2:33.83
2012	Sapphire	4	Pat Smullen	Dermot Weld	2:45.76
2013	Venus de Milo	4	Joseph O'Brien	Aidan O'Brien	2:39.88
2014	Edelmira	3	Pat Smullen	Dermot Weld	2:41.22
2015	Zannda	3	Pat Smullen	Dermot Weld	2:36.18
2016	Best In The World	3	Colm O'Donoghue	Aidan O'Brien	2:35.14
2017	Eziyra	3	Pat Smullen	Dermot Weld	2:37.93
2018	Sizzling	3	Seamie Heffernan	Aidan O'Brien	2:34.83
2019	Tarnawa	3	Chris Hayes	Dermot Weld	2:41.76
2020	Tarnawa	4	Oisin Orr	Dermot Weld	2:35.78
2021	La Petite Coco	3	Billy Lee	Paddy Twomey	2:39.84
2022	Rumbles Of Thunder	4	Billy Lee	Paddy Twomey	2:35.26
2023	Terms of Endearment	4	Colin Keane	Henry de Bromhead	2:54.63
2024	Shamida	4	Chris Hayes	Dermot Weld	2:30.33
2025	Elana Osario	4	Colin Keane	Paddy Twomey	2:32.89

== See also ==
- Horse racing in Ireland
- List of Irish flat horse races
