= Tarnawa (horse) =

Irish Thoroughbred racehorse

- Sire: Shamardal
- Grandsire: Giant's Causeway
- Dam: Tarana
- Damsire: Cape Cross
- Sex: Filly
- Foaled: 9 February 2016
- Country: Ireland
- Colour: Chestnut
- Breeder: Aga Khan IV
- Owner: Aga Khan IV
- Trainer: Dermot Weld
- Record: 15: 9-2-2
- Earnings: £2,223,457

Major wins
- Blue Wind Stakes (2019); Give Thanks Stakes (2019, 2020); Blandford Stakes (2019); Prix Vermeille (2020); Prix de l'Opera (2020); Breeders' Cup Turf (2020); Ballyroan Stakes (2021)

Tarnawa (foaled 9 February 2016) is an Irish Thoroughbred racehorse. After failing to win in three starts as a two-year-old in 2018 she improved in the following year to win four races including the Blue Wind Stakes, Give Thanks Stakes and Blandford Stakes. She returned in 2020 to win a second Give Thanks Stakes before taking the Prix Vermeille, Prix de l'Opera and Breeders' Cup Turf.

== Background ==
Tarnawa is a chestnut mare with a small white star bred in Ireland by her owner Aga Khan IV. She was sent into training with Dermot Weld at the Curragh in County Kildare.

She was from the tenth crop of foals sired by Shamardal whose wins included the Dewhurst Stakes, Poule d'Essai des Poulains, Prix du Jockey Club and St. James's Palace Stakes. His other offspring have included Able Friend, Mukhadram, Lope de Vega and Blue Point. Tarnawa was the first foal of her dam Tarana who won three of her ten races including the Listed Oyster Stakes, and was a daughter of the Galtres Stakes winner Tarakala. She was a female-line descendant of the outstanding French racemare Texana.

== Racing career ==
=== 2018: two-year-old season ===
Tarnawa was ridden in all of her races as a two-year-old by Declan McDonogh. She began her racing career by running third to Hermosa in a maiden race over seven furlongs at Galway Races on 31 July and then finished second to Fire Fly when starting 11/10 favourite for a similar event at Tipperary Racecourse a month later. At Navan Racecourse on 14 October she was stepped up in class and distance to contest the Listed Staffordstown Stud Stakes over one mile and finished second of the eight runners, beaten one and three quarter lengths by the winner Peach Tree.

=== 2019: three-year-old season ===
Chris Hayes took over from McDonogh to become Tarnawa's regular jockey in 2019. On her three-year-old debut the filly started favourite for a maiden over ten furlongs at Leopardstown Racecourse on 3 April and recorded her first victory as she tracked the leaders before going to the front inside the final furlong and winning by a length from the 25/1 Sweet Dime. After running third to Pink Dogwood and Encapsulation in the Listed Salsabil Stakes at Navan later that month, she moved up to Group 3 class for the Blue Wind Stakes at Naas Racecourse in May and went off the 4/1 third choice in the betting behind the four-year-old Who's Steph and Peach Tree. She raced in fourth place before making strong progress in the last quarter mile and overtook Who's Steph in the final strides to win by a neck. After the race Dermot Weld, who had trained the mare in whose honour the race was named, said "It was a good performance by her. I thought she'd be hard to beat today. She's tough, genuine and stays well. We'll see how she comes out of the race before making a decision about where she goes next". In the 241st running of the Oaks Stakes over one and a half miles at Epsom Racecourse on 31 May Tarnawa started a 20/1 outsider and came home eleventh of the fourteen runners behind Anapurna, beaten more than thirteen lengths by the winner.

Tarnawa returned to the track after a break of two and a half months for the Group 3 Give Thanks Stakes at Cork Racecourse and went off the 7/2 second favourite behind Simply Beautiful. After racing towards the rear of the six-runner field she took the lead inside the last quarter mile and kept on strongly to win "comfortably" by two and a half lengths. Weld commented "She is very consistent and has now won a second Group race and I think she is getting better. She had a busy spring, is tough and had a nice break since the Oaks. I was disappointed at Epsom, the ground might have been a little bit quick for her, but she did not come down the hill at Epsom." Four weeks later the filly started the 3/1 second favourite behind Goddess (Snow Fairy Stakes) for the Group 2 Blandford Stakes at the Curragh. She raced in third before taking the lead in the straight and held off a challenge from the favourite to win by one and a half lengths despite hanging to the right in the closing stages. Chris Hayes commented "She's a high-class filly and thankfully we came up with a plan and we were able to execute it... I got there plenty soon and she wandered around a little bit. I think when she steps up in company again you will see a better filly again".

For her final run of the season Tarnawa was sent to England to contest the British Champions Fillies & Mares Stakes over one and a half miles at Ascot Racecourse in which she started at odds of 10/1 and came home ninth of the twelve runners behind Star Catcher, beaten just over eight lengths by the winner.

=== 2020: four-year-old season ===
The flat racing season in Britain and Ireland was restructured as a result of the COVID-19 pandemic and Tarnawa did not reappear until 8 August when she attempted to repeat her 2019 success in the Give Thanks Stakes in which she was ridden by Oisin Orr and started third choice in the betting behind the three-year-olds Cayenne Pepper and Passion (respectively second and third in the Irish Oaks). After being settled in sixth place she took the lead from Passion entering the last quarter mile and won comfortably by one and three quarter lengths with Cayenne Pepper taking second.

On 13 September Tarnawa was sent to France for the Group 1 Prix Vermeille over 2400 metres at Longchamp Racecourse. Partnered by Christophe Soumillon she started the 5.6/1 third favourite behind Raabihah (Prix de Psyche) and Even So in a ten-runner field which also included Grand Glory (third in the 2019 Prix de Diane), Dame Malliot (Princess of Wales's Stakes), Wonderful Tonight and Laburnum (Hurry Harriet Stakes). Tarnawa was restrained towards the rear as Dame Malliot set the pace before moving up on the outside in the straight. She gained the advantage 200 metres from the finish and drew away in the closing stages to win "readily" by three lengths and a short head from Raabihah and Dame Malliot. Weld, who was winning the race for the first time said "The autumn was always the plan for her and she came back to me looking in great condition. She went to Cork and won the Group 3 from Cayenne Pepper and it was just a real good performance. And she put up a real good performance today".

On 4 October Tarnawa returned to Longchamp for the Prix de l'Opéra over 2000 metres on heavy ground and started the 3.6/1 third choice in the betting behind Alpine Star and Tawkeel while the other nine runners included Audarya, Ambition (Prix Corrida) and Grand Glory. With Soumillon again in the saddle, she was restrained towards the rear of the field as Tawkeel set the pace from Alpine Star, before making steady progress in the straight. Tarnawa reeled in the front-runners, caught the leader Alpine Star in the final strides and won by a short neck. Weld commented "Early on I was concerned she wasn't handling the ground at all, but there is a standard way we ride Tarnawa all the time. We take our time and gradually improve throughout the race, and that's what Christophe did."

For her final run of the year, the filly was sent to the United States to contest the Breeders' Cup Turf at Keeneland on 7 November when she was ridden by Colin Keane and started the 3/1 second favourite behind Magical. COVID-19 played a part in the arrangements: Soumillon was barred from taking the ride after testing positive for the virus while Dermot Weld was obliged to stay in Ireland, leaving his son Mark to saddle the filly. The other contenders included Mogul, Lord North, United (John Henry Turf Championship Stakes), Arklow (Joe Hirsch Turf Classic Stakes), Mehdaayih (Prix de Malleret) and Channel Maker (Sword Dancer Stakes). After being restrained towards the rear of the ten-runner field she was switched to the wide outside in the straight and began to make rapid progress. Tarnawa overtook the front-running Channel Maker 150 yards from the finish and won "readily" by a length from Magical. Mark Weld said "It's been a wonderful journey with her. We're absolutely over the moon... It's what dreams are made of... Instructions-wise, we left it to Colin. He's not the champion jockey of Ireland for nothing."

In the 2020 World's Best Racehorse Rankings, Tarnawa was rated on 122, making her the equal twenty-first best racehorse in the world.

She is currently scanned in foal to Frankel (GB).

== Pedigree ==
Pedigree of Tarnawa (IRE), chestnut filly, 2016
Sire Shamardal (USA) 2002	Giant's Causeway (USA); 1997	Storm Cat	Storm Bird (CAN)
Sire Shamardal (USA) 2002	Giant's Causeway (USA); 1997	Storm Cat	Terlingua
Sire Shamardal (USA) 2002	Giant's Causeway (USA); 1997	Mariah's Storm	Rahy
Sire Shamardal (USA) 2002	Giant's Causeway (USA); 1997	Mariah's Storm	Immense
Sire Shamardal (USA) 2002	Helsinki (GB); 1993	Machiavellian (USA)	Mr Prospector
Sire Shamardal (USA) 2002	Helsinki (GB); 1993	Machiavellian (USA)	Coup de Folie
Sire Shamardal (USA) 2002	Helsinki (GB); 1993	Helen Street	Troy
Sire Shamardal (USA) 2002	Helsinki (GB); 1993	Helen Street	Waterway (FR)
Dam Tarana (IRE) 2010	Cape Cross (IRE); 1994	Green Desert (USA)	Danzig
Dam Tarana (IRE) 2010	Cape Cross (IRE); 1994	Green Desert (USA)	Foreign Courier
Dam Tarana (IRE) 2010	Cape Cross (IRE); 1994	Park Appeal	Ahonoora (GB)
Dam Tarana (IRE) 2010	Cape Cross (IRE); 1994	Park Appeal	Balydaress
Dam Tarana (IRE) 2010	Tarakala (IRE); 2001	Dr Fong (USA)	Kris S
Dam Tarana (IRE) 2010	Tarakala (IRE); 2001	Dr Fong (USA)	Spring Flight
Dam Tarana (IRE) 2010	Tarakala (IRE); 2001	Tarakana (USA)	Shahrastani
Dam Tarana (IRE) 2010	Tarakala (IRE); 2001	Tarakana (USA)	Tarafa (IRE) (Family: 5-b)
