= Ballyroan =

Ballyroan may refer to various things in Ireland:

== Places ==
- Ballyroan, Dublin, a suburb
- Ballyroan, County Laois, a town

== Sport ==
- Ballyroan GAA, a former gaelic football club in County Laois
- Ballyroan Abbey GAA, the football club that replaced Ballyroan GAA, above
- Ballyroan Stakes, an annual horse race at Leopardstown Racecourse
