= Victor McCalmont Memorial Stakes =

Flat horse race in Ireland

Victor McCalmont Memorial Stakes
2026
Sindria	Lemsairbat	Subsonic

Previous years
2025
Madam Celeste	Jancis	Thalara
2024
Empress Of Beauty	Goldana	Mexicali Rose
2023
Indian Wish	Angels Wrath	Dower House
2022
Rumbles Of Thunder	Seisai	Shahaada
2021
Too Soon To Panic	Empress Josephine	French Fusion

2020-2011
2020
Lemista	Come September	Snapraeceps
2019
Who's Steph	Moteo	Credenza
2018
Turret Rocks	Clear Skies	I'm So Fancy
2017
Somehow	Sea Swift	Laganore
2016
Bocca Baciata	Discipline	Steip Amach
2015
Legatissimo	Wedding Vow	Euphrasia
2014
I'm Yours	We'll Go Walking	Coolibah
2013
Caponata	We'll Go Walking	Aloof
2012
Tannery	Soon	Chrysanthemum
2011
Banimpire	Wild Wind	Barring Decree

2010-2001
2010
Chinese White	She's Our Mark	Remember When
2009
She's Our Mark	Chinese White	Latin Love
2008
Chinese White	Zafayra	Indiana Gal
2007
Anna Karenina	Dimenticata	Diamond Necklace
2006
Galatee	Helena Molony	Talwin
2005
Hazariya	Mermaid Island	Tropical Lady
2004
Misty Heights	Leonor Fini	Sand N Sea
2003
Miss Honorine	Moonbi Ridge	Hymn Of Love
2002
Fionns Folly	Pietra Dura	Aquila Oculus
2001
Dearly	Chiming	Alexander Express

2000-1997
2000
Katiykha	Palace Royale	Simplicity
1999
Orange Sunset	Catherina	Pink Coral
1997
Token Gesture	French Ballerina	Family Tradition

The Victor McCalmont Memorial Stakes is a Listed flat horse race in Ireland open to thoroughbred fillies and mares aged four years or older. It is run at Gowran Park over a distance of 1 mile, 1 furlong and 100 yards (1,902 metres), and it is scheduled to take place each year in late April or early May.

The race is named in honour of Victor McCalmont, the Irish racing administrator and owner-breeder.

The race was run over 12 furlongs until 2000.

== Records ==
Most successful horse (2 wins):

- Chinese White - (2008, 2010)

Leading jockey (5 wins):

- Pat Smullen - Misty Heights (2004), Chinese White (2008,2010), Caponata (2013), I'm Yours (2014)

Leading trainer (6 wins):

- Dermot Weld – Token Gesture (1997), Misty Heights (2004), Chinese White (2008,2010), Caponata (2013), I'm Yours (2014)

== Winners ==
Year	Winner	Age	Jockey	Trainer	Time
1997	Token Gesture	3	Michael Kinane	Dermot Weld	2:41.60
1998	No race
1999	Orange Sunset	3	Jamie Spencer	Liam Browne	2:45.60
2000	Katiykha	4	Johnny Murtagh	John Oxx	2:41.30
2001	Dearly	3	Johnny Murtagh	John Oxx	1:58.40
2002	Fionns Folly	3	Seamie Heffernan	Irène-Térésa Oakes-Cottin	2:09.00
2003	Miss Honorine	4	Johnny Murtagh	John Oxx	2:04.40
2004	Misty Heights	3	Pat Smullen	Dermot Weld	2:00.00
2005	Hazariya	3	Michael Kinane	John Oxx	2:01.70
2006	Galatee	3	Kevin Manning	Jim Bolger	2:08.60
2007	Anna Karenina	4	Wayne Lordan	David Wachman	1:58.20
2008	Chinese White	3	Pat Smullen	Dermot Weld	2:07.91
2009	She's Our Mark	5	D M Grant	Patrick J. Flynn	2:11.89
2010	Chinese White	5	Pat Smullen	Dermot Weld	2:01.08
2011	Banimpire	3	Kevin Manning	Jim Bolger	2:00.60
2012	Tannery	3	Niall McCullagh	David Wachman	2:11.23
2013	Caponata	4	Pat Smullen	Dermot Weld	2:04.17
2014	I'm Yours	3	Pat Smullen	Dermot Weld	2:11.19
2015	Legatissimo	3	Wayne Lordan	David Wachman	1:58.58
2016	Bocca Baciata	4	Colm O'Donoghue	Jessica Harrington	2:01.64
2017	Somehow	4	Seamie Heffernan	Aidan O'Brien	2:09.22
2018	Turret Rocks	5	Kevin Manning	Jim Bolger	2:02.62
2019	Who's Steph	4	Colin Keane	Ger Lyons	2:03.24
2020	Lemista (Note: The 2020 race was run in June due to the COVID-19 pandemic in the Republic of Ireland)	3	Colin Keane	Ger Lyons	2:04.71
2021	Too Soon To Panic	4	Chris Hayes	Fozzie Stack	2:07.95
2022	Rumbles of Thunder	4	Colin Keane	Paddy Twomey	2:03.31
2023	Indian Wish	4	Declan McDonogh	Joseph O'Brien	2:03.68
2024	Empress of Beauty	4	Billy Lee	Henry de Bromhead	2:21.27
2025	Madam Celeste	4	Colin Keane	Ger Lyons	2:00.57
2026	Sindria	4	Dylan Browne McMonagle	Joseph O'Brien	2:00:15

== See also ==
- Horse racing in Ireland
- List of Irish flat horse races
