= Legatissimo =

British-bred Thoroughbred racehorse

- Racing silks of Michael Tabor
- Sire: Danehill Dancer
- Grandsire: Danehill
- Dam: Yummy Mummy
- Damsire: Montjeu
- Sex: Filly
- Foaled: 22 April 2012
- Country: United Kingdom
- Colour: Bay
- Breeder: Newsells Park Stud
- Owner: Michael Tabor, Derrick Smith and Susan Magnier
- Trainer: David Wachman
- Record: 10: 5-3-0
- Earnings: £892,584

Major wins
- Victor McCalmont Memorial Stakes (2015); 1000 Guineas (2015); Nassau Stakes (2015); Matron Stakes (2015)

Awards
- Cartier Champion Three-year-old Filly (2015)

Legatissimo (foaled 22 April 2012) is a British-bred Irish-trained Thoroughbred racehorse. After showing some promise as a juvenile, she showed marked improvement in the spring of 2015 and recorded her first major success in the 1000 Guineas. On her next appearance she was narrowly beaten when favourite for The Oaks. After another narrow defeat in the Pretty Polly Stakes she returned to top form to win the Nassau Stakes and the Matron Stakes

== Background ==
Legatissimo is a bay filly with a large, diamond-shaped white star and white coronet markings on her hind legs bred by the Hertfordshire-based Newsells Park Stud. She was sired by Danehill Dancer, who won the Phoenix Stakes, National Stakes and Greenham Stakes before becoming a very successful breeding stallion. His other progeny have included Choisir, Mastercraftsman and Dancing Rain. Legatissimo's dam Yummy Mummy, won only one minor race at Sligo Racecourse from seven starts in 2007 and 2008, but was a full-sister to Fame and Glory, whose wins included the Irish Derby, Coronation Cup and Ascot Gold Cup.

In October 2013, the yearling filly was sent to the Tattersalls sale and was bought for 330,000 guineas by Michael Vincent Magnier acting for the Coolmore organisation. The filly was sent into training with David Wachman at Goolds Cross, County Tipperary.

== Racing career ==
=== 2014: two-year-old season ===
Legatissimo began her racing career in a seven furlong maiden race at Leopardstown Racecourse on 3 July and finished sixth of the even runners behind the odds-on favourite Pleascach. Later that month she started at odds of 12/1 for a similar event at Galway and recorded her first success, staying on well in the final furlong to win by half a length from Tamadhor. On her final appearance of the season she was moved up in class and distance for the Listed Flame of Tara Stakes over one mile at the Curragh on 31 August. Ridden as in her two previous start by Wayne Lordan, she was made the 11/8 favourite, but was beaten three quarters of a lengths by the filly Jack Naylor (previously winner of the Silver Flash Stakes). The third placed Together Forever went on to win the Fillies' Mile at Newmarket in October.

=== Spring ===
On her three-year-old debut, Legatissimo contested the Group Three Leopardstown 1,000 Guineas Trial Stakes on 12 April. Racing on very soft ground she never looked likely to win and finished fourth of the eight runners behind the Dermot Weld-trained Stormfly, beaten 5 1/2 lengths by the winner. Two weeks later, the filly was moved up in distance for the Listed Victor McAlmont Memorial Stakes over 9 1/2 furlongs at Gowran Park. After racing towards the rear of the five-runner field, she moved forward in the straight, took the lead a furlong and a half from the finish, and drew away in the closing stages to win by three and three quarter lengths from Wedding Vow.

On 3 May 2015, Legatissimo, ridden for the first time by Ryan Moore was one of thirteen fillies to contest the 202nd running of the 1000 Guineas over the Rowley Mile course at Newmarket. She was made the 13/2 second favourite behind her fellow Irish challenger Lucida, winner of the Rockfel Stakes. She produced a very strong run in the last quarter mile to win by 3/4 of a length from Lucida, with a gap of 4 1/2 lengths back to the leading English filly Tiggy Wiggy in third. The winning time of 1:34.60 was the second fastest in the history of the race and almost a second faster than Gleneagles ran in the 2000 Guineas on the same course a day earlier. Wachman commented "She's a lovely, big scopy filly and Ryan gave her a nice ride. We've always liked her and we weren't concerned coming back in trip. We were worried we were running her back too quickly but we thought we'd take our chance. She'll get further but we'll discuss where we go next. She's a very good filly".

=== Summer ===
On 5 June, Legatissimo was moved up in distance and started 5/2 favourite for the 237th running of the Oaks Stakes over 1 1/2 miles at Epsom Downs Racecourse. After turning into the straight in seventh place she looked unlikely to obtain a clear run but Moore forced her through the field to take the lead approaching the final furlong. Legatissimo opened up a clear advantage and looked likely to win but was caught in the last stride and beaten a short head by the 50/1 outsider Qualify. After the race Wachman said that the filly would be dropped back in distance for her subsequent races. At the end of the month she was matched against older fillies and mares and started 6/4 favourite for the Group One Pretty Polly Stakes at the Curragh. After losing her position she finished strongly but failed by a short head to catch Diamondsandrubies. Wachman offered no excuses and said that Legatissimo would probably reappear in the Nassau Stakes.

The Nassau Stakes at Goodwood Racecourse on 1 August saw Legatissimo facing Diamondsandrubies again, whilst the other runners included Star of Seville (Prix de Diane), Arabian Queen, Cladocera (winner of two valuable races in Dubai), Wedding Vow (Kilboy Estate Stakes), Lady of Dubai (Height of Fashion Stakes) and Jazzi Top (Pretty Polly Stakes (Great Britain)). Ridden by Lordan for the first time since April, she started 2/1 favourite, with Diamondsandrubies the second choice on 100/30. After racing in mid-division, Legatissimo moved up on the outside entering the straight, took the lead approaching the final furlong and accelerated clear of the field to win by two and a quarter lengths from Wedding Vow. Arabian Queen finished third ahead of Cladocera, Jazzi Top and Lady of Dubai, all three of whom encountered interference in the final quarter mile. Wachman commented "She showed a really good turn of foot, just as she did in the Guineas, and I would say anything between a mile and 10 furlongs is ideal for her. There are plenty of options for her between now and the end of the year. We could think about taking on the boys, but I will have to speak to the owners first".

=== Autumn ===
At Leopardstown in September Legatissimo was matched against the British four-year-old Amazing Maria (winner of the Falmouth Stakes and the Prix Rothschild) in the Matron Stakes. The other seven runners included Brooch (Lanwades Stud Stakes), Euro Charline (Beverly D. Stakes), Cladocera, Ainippe (Brownstown Stakes) and Raydara (Debutante Stakes). Lordan positioned the filly just behind the leaders as Euro Charline set the pace before taking the lead approaching the final furlong. She accelerated clear of her opponents and won by two and a quarter lengths from Cladocera with Ainippe another two and a quarter lengths back in third. After the race Wachmn said "She is probably the best I've ever trained at this stage. She has been so good all year and this was probably her best performance. She travelled very well and she quickened once and put in bed. She is getting better as the year goes and we'd like to go to the Breeders' Cup with her now".

Legatissimo ended her season with a trip to the United States for the Breeders' Cup Filly and Mare Turf over 9 1/2 furlongs at Keeneland on 31 October. Ridden by Moore she started the 8/11 favourite against nine opponents. After stumbling at the start she settled in mid-division and finished well but was beaten a length and a quarter into second place by the six-year-old mare Stephanie's Kitten.

On 10 November 2015, Legatissimo was named Cartier Champion Three-year-old Filly at the 25th edition of the Cartier Racing Awards.

Legatissimo remained in training in 2016 but was retired without racing again after a training setback in April.

== Pedigree ==
Pedigree of Legatissimo (GB), bay filly, 2012
Sire Danehill Dancer (IRE) 1993	Danehill (USA); 1986	Danzig	Northern Dancer
Sire Danehill Dancer (IRE) 1993	Danehill (USA); 1986	Danzig	Pas de Nom
Sire Danehill Dancer (IRE) 1993	Danehill (USA); 1986	Razvana	His Majesty
Sire Danehill Dancer (IRE) 1993	Danehill (USA); 1986	Razvana	Spring Adieu
Sire Danehill Dancer (IRE) 1993	Mira Adonde (USA); 1986	Sharpen Up	Atan
Sire Danehill Dancer (IRE) 1993	Mira Adonde (USA); 1986	Sharpen Up	Rocchetta
Sire Danehill Dancer (IRE) 1993	Mira Adonde (USA); 1986	Lettre D'Amour	Caro
Sire Danehill Dancer (IRE) 1993	Mira Adonde (USA); 1986	Lettre D'Amour	Lianga
Dam Yummy Mummy (GB) 2005	Montjeu (IRE); 1996	Sadler's Wells	Northern Dancer
Dam Yummy Mummy (GB) 2005	Montjeu (IRE); 1996	Sadler's Wells	Fairy Bridge
Dam Yummy Mummy (GB) 2005	Montjeu (IRE); 1996	Floripedes	Top Ville
Dam Yummy Mummy (GB) 2005	Montjeu (IRE); 1996	Floripedes	Toute Cy
Dam Yummy Mummy (GB) 2005	Gryada (GB); 1993	Shirley Heights	Mill Reef
Dam Yummy Mummy (GB) 2005	Gryada (GB); 1993	Shirley Heights	Hardiemma
Dam Yummy Mummy (GB) 2005	Gryada (GB); 1993	Grimpola	Windwurf
Dam Yummy Mummy (GB) 2005	Gryada (GB); 1993	Grimpola	Gondel (Family 1-i)
