= Give Thanks (horse) =

British-bred Thoroughbred racehorse

- Racing silks of Mrs Ogden White
- Sire: Relko
- Grandsire: Tanerko
- Dam: Parthica
- Damsire: Parthia
- Sex: Mare
- Foaled: 13 April 1980
- Country: United Kingdom
- Colour: Bay
- Breeder: Mrs M P Pitt
- Owner: Mrs Ogden White
- Trainer: Jim Bolger
- Record: 15: 6-2-3

Major wins
- Lingfield Oaks Trial (1983); Musidora Stakes (1983); Lancashire Oaks (1983); Irish Oaks (1983)

Awards
- Top-rated Irish three-year-old filly (1983); Timeform rating: 123 (1983), 106 (1984)

Honours
- Give Thanks Stakes at Cork Racecourse

Give Thanks (13 April 1980 – December 1998) was a British-bred, Irish-trained Thoroughbred racehorse and broodmare. After showing little ability as a juvenile she emerged as a leading performer over middle distances in 1983. She won six of her first seven races including the Lingfield Oaks Trial, Musidora Stakes, Lancashire Oaks and Irish Oaks. She was also placed in the Yorkshire Oaks, Park Hill Stakes and Gallinule Stakes and ended the year rated the best filly of her generation in Ireland. After her retirement from racing she had some success as a broodmare, being the dam of the Falmouth Stakes winner Alshakr, and the grand-dam of Harayir.

== Background ==
Give Thanks was a "workmanlike" bay mare with a small white star bred in England by Mrs M. P. Pitt. As a yearling in December she was put up for auction and was sold for 33,000 guineas. She entered the ownership of Mrs Ogden White and was sent to Ireland where she was trained by Jim Bolger. She was ridden in most of her races by the Irish jockey Declan Gillespie.

She was sired by Relko, the French-trained winner of the 1963 Epsom Derby. Relko was not a conspicuous success as a breeding stallion, although he did sire Relkino, Olwyn, Lanfranco. Her dam Parthica showed some ability as a racehorse and was a daughter of the influential broodmare Violetta, whose other descendants have included Sir Percy, Teenoso, Harayir, Rule of Law and Olympic Glory.

== Racing career ==
=== 1982: two-year-old season ===
As a two-year-old in 1982 Give Thanks failed to win in three races. She finished unplaced in her first two races over seven furlongs and then finished third over one mile on her final appearance of the season.

=== 1983: three-year-old season ===
On her first appearance as a three-year-old Give Thanks recorded her first success as she won a maiden race over ten furlongs on heavy ground at Navan Racecourse. She followed up by winning a race over nine furlongs at Phoenix Park Racecourse by three lengths. Although she had never been entered for The Oaks, the filly was then sent to England to contest two of the major trials for the race. In the Lingfield Oaks Trial over 1 1/2 miles on 6 May she won by five lengths from the highly regarded British filly Cormorant Wood. Five days later she was dropped back in distance and started the 13/8 favourite for the Musidora Stakes over 10 1/2 furlongs at York Racecourse. She produced an even better performance as she won by eight lengths from So True and New Coins, with the other three runners (including the Fillies' Mile winner Acclimatise) reportedly "strung out like washing". Later that month she was matched against male opposition in the Gallinule Stakes at the Curragh and finished second to the colt Carlingford Castle. Although there was some disappointment at the result (she had started 5/6 favourite), the form of the race looked much better after Carlingford Castle finished second to Teenoso in the 1983 Epsom Derby on 1 June.

Give Thanks was back in England in July for the Lancashire Oaks on good ground at Haydock Park and started at 4/1 with the best of her twelve opponents looking to be Acclimatise, who had finished second to Sun Princess in the Epsom Oaks and Ski Sailing who had beaten Sun Princess at Newbury earlier in the season. In a slowly-run race. the Irish filly looked to be struggling when the pace quickened in the straight but got to the front a furlong out and drew away in the closing stages to win by two lengths from Ski Sailing. On 21 July, on her seventh run of the campaign, Give Thanks was moved up to Group 1 class for the first time to contest the Irish Oaks over 1 1/2 miles on firm ground at the Curragh, and started the 7/4 favourite ahead of the British-trained challengers High Hawk (winner of the Ribblesdale Stakes at Royal Ascot) and Shore Line (fourth in the Epsom Oaks). The best-fancied of the other nine runners were Safe Process, Bay Empress (third in the Pretty Polly Stakes) and Green Lucia. After tracking the pacemaker Hocus Pocus, Give Thanks took the lead entering the straight, accelerated clear of her rivals and stayed on to win by 2 1/2 lengths from High Hawk with Green Lucia in third place.

The much-anticipated meeting between Give Thanks and the English champion Sun Princess took place in the Yorkshire Oaks on 16 August and the fillies started at 7/4 and 6/5 respectively in a six-runner field. In the event Give Thanks failed to show her best form and was beaten seven lengths into third place by Sun Princess and Green Lucia. She was then moved up in distance and started favourite for the Park Hill Stakes over 14 1/2 furlongs at Doncaster Racecourse on 7 September but was beaten three-uarters of a length by the improving High Hawk. The filly ended her season with a trip to the United States for the Washington, D.C. International at Laurel Park on 12 November. She finished fifth of the eight runners behind All Along, losing third place in a multiple photo-finish.

=== 1984: four-year-old season ===
At the end of the 1983 season Give Thanks was retired from racing and was covered by the stallion Kings Lake in early 1984. She failed to conceive and was sent back into training later that year. On her return to the track in September at the Curragh she ran promisingly when taking third place behind Opale and Marble Run in the Meld Stakes. Later that month, on her only subsequent start she finished fifth behind the gelding Bedtime in the September Stakes at Kempton Park Racecourse.

== Assessment and honours ==
The level of Give Thanks' performances in 1982 were insufficient to earn her a place in the Irish Free Handicap. In the official International Classification for 1983 she was rated on 82, nine pounds behind the top-rated three-year-old filly Habibti. She was the top-rated Irish three-year-old filly, alongside Flame of Tara. The independent Timeform organisation gave her a rating of 123, 13 pounds behind Habibti who was their Horse of the Year. She was rated 106 by Timeform in 1984.

Give Thanks is honoured in the name of the Give Thanks Stakes, established in 2003 at Cork Racecourse.

== Breeding record ==
After the end of her racing career, Give Thanks became a broodmare for Hamdan Al Maktoum's Shadwell Stud. She produced eight foals and three winners between 1986 and 1995:

- Saffaanh, a bay filly, foaled in 1986, sired by Shareef Dancer. Failed to win in five races. Dam of Harayir.
- Ghzaalh, chestnut filly, 1987, by Northern Dancer. Failed to win in two races.
- Makin, bay colt, 1990, by Danzig. Failed to win in five races.
- Bilad, dark bay or brown filly, 1992, by Riverman. Unraced.
- Shahrur, black or brown colt (later gelded), 1993, by Riverman. Won two flat races and four hurdle races.
- Mukdar, brown colt (later gelded), 1994, by Gulch. Won five hurdle races.
- Lughz, chestnut filly, 1995, by Housebuster. Unraced.
- Alshakr, bay filly, 1995, by Bahri. Won two races including Falmouth Stakes.

Give Thanks died at Shadwell Stud in December 1998 at the age of 18.

== Pedigree ==
Pedigree of Give Thanks, bay mare, 1980
Sire Relko (GB) 1960	Tanerko (FR); 1953	Tantieme	Deux Pour Cent
Sire Relko (GB) 1960	Tanerko (FR); 1953	Tantieme	Terka
Sire Relko (GB) 1960	Tanerko (FR); 1953	La Divine	Fair Copy
Sire Relko (GB) 1960	Tanerko (FR); 1953	La Divine	La Diva
Sire Relko (GB) 1960	Relance (FR); 1952	Relic	War Relic
Sire Relko (GB) 1960	Relance (FR); 1952	Relic	Bridal Colors
Sire Relko (GB) 1960	Relance (FR); 1952	Polaire	Le Volcan
Sire Relko (GB) 1960	Relance (FR); 1952	Polaire	Stella Polaris
Dam Parthica (GB) 1965	Parthia (GB); 1956	Persian Gulf	Bahram
Dam Parthica (GB) 1965	Parthia (GB); 1956	Persian Gulf	Double Life
Dam Parthica (GB) 1965	Parthia (GB); 1956	Lightning	Hyperion
Dam Parthica (GB) 1965	Parthia (GB); 1956	Lightning	Chenille
Dam Parthica (GB) 1965	Violetta (ITY); 1958	Pinza	Chanteur
Dam Parthica (GB) 1965	Violetta (ITY); 1958	Pinza	Pasqua
Dam Parthica (GB) 1965	Violetta (ITY); 1958	Urshalim	Nasrullah
Dam Parthica (GB) 1965	Violetta (ITY); 1958	Urshalim	Horama (Family 3-c)
