= Daddy Long Legs (horse) =

American-bred Thoroughbred racehorse

- Sire: Scat Daddy
- Grandsire: Johannesburg
- Dam: Dreamy Maiden
- Damsire: Meadowlake
- Sex: Stallion
- Foaled: 12 February 2009
- Country: USA
- Colour: Chestnut
- Breeder: Woodford Thoroughbreds LLC
- Owner: Michael Tabor; Derrick Smith; Mrs John Magnier
- Trainer: Aidan O'Brien; Mike de Kock
- Record: 16: 3–0–0
- Earnings: £869,014

Major wins
- Royal Lodge Stakes (2011); UAE Derby (2012)

Daddy Long Legs (foaled 12 February 2009) is a Thoroughbred racehorse owned by Michael Tabor, Derrick Smith and Mrs John Magnier and trained by Aidan O'Brien. He has won the Royal Lodge Stakes and UAE Derby.

== Breeding ==
Daddy Long Legs is a son of Florida Derby winner Scat Daddy. He is one of Scat Daddy's first crop of foals. Daddy Long Legs' dam Dreamy Maiden is a daughter of Meadowlake.

== Racing career ==
=== 2011: Two-year-old season ===
In 2011, after winning a maiden at Gowran Park, he finished fourth in the Champagne Stakes. His next run came in the Royal Lodge Stakes at Newmarket, where he started at the odds of 11/4. Ridden from the front by Colm O'Donoghue he went clear with two furlongs to run and won by 3 1/4 lengths from Tenth Star, with future Breeders' Cup Juvenile Turf winner Wrote another ½ length back in third. His final start of the season came in the Breeders' Cup Juvenile where he finished in twelfth, tailed off behind winner Hansen.

=== 2012: Three-year-old season ===
Daddy Long Legs's first start as a three-year-old came in the UAE Derby. After tracking the leaders O'Donoghue sent him to the front with 2 1/2 furlongs to run and he ran on to win by 1 1/4 lengths from Yang Tse Kiang with Wrote another ¾ length back in third place. He then returned to the United States for the Kentucky Derby, but tailed off in the race and was pulled up by Colm O'Donoghue. He then finished fourth in the Irish 2,000 Guineas behind stablemate Power after setting the early pace, but fading in the closing stages. He finished last of the eight runners in the Secretariat Stakes He then finished last of the six runners in the Irish Champion Stakes after acting as a pacemaker for stablemate St Nicholas Abbey. The race was won by Snow Fairy.

=== 2013: Four-year-old season ===
Daddy Long Legs was sent to be trained by Mike de Kock and ran three times, without winning, at Meydan in February and March 2013. He returned to England at the end of the year for the Ben Marshall Stakes at Newmarket. He started as a 16/1 outsider and finished fifth of the six runners, about three lengths behind winner Penitent.

=== 2014: Five-year-old season ===
Daddy Long Legs started 2014 by finishing sixth in the Group 2 Al Maktoum Challenge Round 1 on 9 January, but then finished in the rear of the field on his two subsequent starts, which were handicaps at Meydan.

== Pedigree ==
Pedigree of Daddy Long Legs, chestnut colt, 2009
Sire Scat Daddy (USA) b. 2004	Johannesburg b. 1999	Hennessy ch. 1993	Storm Cat
Sire Scat Daddy (USA) b. 2004	Johannesburg b. 1999	Hennessy ch. 1993	Island Kitty
Sire Scat Daddy (USA) b. 2004	Johannesburg b. 1999	Myth b. 1993	Ogygian
Sire Scat Daddy (USA) b. 2004	Johannesburg b. 1999	Myth b. 1993	Yarn
Sire Scat Daddy (USA) b. 2004	Love Style ch. 1999	Mr. Prospector b. 1970	Raise a Native*
Sire Scat Daddy (USA) b. 2004	Love Style ch. 1999	Mr. Prospector b. 1970	Gold Digger
Sire Scat Daddy (USA) b. 2004	Love Style ch. 1999	Likeable Style b. 1990	Nijinsky II
Sire Scat Daddy (USA) b. 2004	Love Style ch. 1999	Likeable Style b. 1990	Personable Lady
Dam Dreamy Maiden (USA) ch. 1996	Meadowlake ch. 1983	Hold Your Peace b. 1969	Speak John
Dam Dreamy Maiden (USA) ch. 1996	Meadowlake ch. 1983	Hold Your Peace b. 1969	Blue Moon
Dam Dreamy Maiden (USA) ch. 1996	Meadowlake ch. 1983	Suspicious Native ch. 1972	Raise a Native*
Dam Dreamy Maiden (USA) ch. 1996	Meadowlake ch. 1983	Suspicious Native ch. 1972	Be Suspicious
Dam Dreamy Maiden (USA) ch. 1996	Sparrow Lake b. 1985	Apalachee b. 1971	Round Table
Dam Dreamy Maiden (USA) ch. 1996	Sparrow Lake b. 1985	Apalachee b. 1971	Moccasin
Dam Dreamy Maiden (USA) ch. 1996	Sparrow Lake b. 1985	Stray Flight ch. 1975	Viceregal
Dam Dreamy Maiden (USA) ch. 1996	Sparrow Lake b. 1985	Stray Flight ch. 1975	Barn Swallow

Note: b. = Bay, ch. = Chestnut

* Daddy Long Legs is inbred 4 × 4 to Raise a Native. This means that the stallion appears twice in the fourth generation of his pedigree.
