= Glencairn Stakes =

Flat horse race in Ireland

- Class: Listed
- Location: Leopardstown; County Dublin, Ireland
- Race type: Flat / Thoroughbred
- Sponsor: Irish Stallion Farms
- Website: Leopardstown

Race information
- Distance: 1 mile 1 furlong (1,811 metres)
- Surface: Turf
- Track: Left-handed
- Qualification: Three-years-old and up
- Weight: 8 st 12 lb (3yo); 9 st 9 lb (4yo+); Allowances; 3 lb for fillies and mares Penalties; 5 lb for G1 / G2 winners * 3 lb for G3 or Listed winners * * since 1 July 2024
- Purse: €45,000 (2025); 1st: €26,550

Glencairn Stakes
2025
Green Impact	Currawood	Azada

Previous years
2024
Tarawa	Cairo	Unreasonable
2023
Moon De Vega	Salt Lake City	Vega Magnifico
2022
Cadillac	Georgeville	Charterhouse
2021
Magnanimous	Fourhometwo	Sinawann

2020-2011
2020
Saltonstall	Raise You	Quizical
2019
Flight Risk	Hand On Heart	Surrounding
2018
Zorion	Allegio	Belle Boyd
2017
Brendan Brackan	Elusive Heights	Making Light
2016
Foxtrot Charlie	Tennessee Wildcat	Orcia
2015
Tennessee Wildcat	Captain Joy	Brendan Brackan
2014
Pearl Of Africa	Leitir Mor	Exactement
2013
Along Came Casey	Brendan Brackan	Flying The Flag
2012
Takar	Soul Custody	Bible Black
2011
Barack	Duff	Wild Wind

2010-2001
2010
Recharge	Croisultan	Finicius
2009
Shreyas	Quinmaster	Indiana Gal
2008
Mustameet	Akua'Ba	Ferneley
2007
Quinmaster	Cheyenne Star	Cougar Bay
2006
Mustameet	Chelsea Rose	Lord Admiral
2005
Lord Admiral	Mustameet	Latino Magic
2004
Abunawwas	Napper Tandy	Fearn Royal
2003
Mr Houdini	Avorado	One More Round
2002
One Won One	Mr Houdini	Gaelic Queen
2001
One Won One	Bach	Tarry Flynn

2000-1997
2000
Annieirwin	Free To Speak	Atacat
1999
Lil's Boy	Twickenham	Lisieux Rose
1998
Sense Of Honour	Renge	Graduated
1997
Tout A Coup	Theano	Rithab

The Glencairn Stakes is a Listed flat horse race in Ireland open to thoroughbreds aged three years or older. It is run at Leopardstown over a distance of 1 mile and 1 furlong (1,811 metres), and is scheduled to take place each year in June. From 2001 to 2021 it was run over 1 mile.

== Records ==
Most successful horse (2 wins):

- One Won One – 2001, 2002
- Mustameet - 2006, 2008

Leading jockey (5 wins):

- Kevin Manning – Lil's Boy (1999), One Won One (2002), Shreyas (2009), Zorion (2018), Flight Risk (2019)

Leading trainer (4 wins):

- Kevin Prendergast – Abunawwas (2004), Mustameet (2006, 2008), Recharge (2010)
- Jim Bolger - Lil's Boy (1999), Shreyas (2009), Zorion (2018), Flight Risk (2019)
- Dermot Weld - Sense Of Honour (1998), Along Came Casey (2013), Foxtrot Charlie (2016), Tarawa (2024)

== Winners ==
Year	Winner	Age	Jockey	Trainer	Time
1997	Tout A Coup	4	Pat Smullen	G A Cusack	2:03.20
1998	Sense Of Honour	4	Pat Shanahan	Dermot Weld	2:01.00
1999	Lil's Boy	5	Kevin Manning	Jim Bolger	1:56.50
2000	Annieirwin	4	Fran Berry	Francis Ennis	1:57.10
2001	One Won One	7	Eddie Ahern	Joanna Morgan	1:43.90
2002	One Won One	8	Kevin Manning	Joanna Morgan	1:44.90
2003	Mr Houdini	6	Michael Kinane	Oliver Finnegan	1:42.50
2004	Abunawwas	4	Declan McDonogh	Kevin Prendergast	1:40.50
2005	Lord Admiral	4	Fran Berry	Charles O'Brien	1:38.30
2006	Mustameet	5	Declan McDonogh	Kevin Prendergast	1:37.95
2007	Quinmaster	5	Johnny Murtagh	Michael Halford	1:39.50
2008	Mustameet	7	C P Geoghegan	Kevin Prendergast	1:42.37
2009	Shreyas	4	Kevin Manning	Jim Bolger	1:39.04
2010	Recharge	4	Chris Hayes	Kevin Prendergast	1:41.16
2011	Barack	5	Ben Curtis	Francis Ennis	1:40.07
2012	Takar	3	Johnny Murtagh	John Oxx	1:50.12
2013	Along Came Casey	5	Pat Smullen	Dermot Weld	1:37.52
2014	Pearl Of Africa	4	Colin Keane	Edward Lynam	1:42.29
2015	Tennessee Wildcat	5	Colin Keane	Ger Lyons	1:46.89
2016	Foxtrot Charlie	3	Pat Smullen	Dermot Weld	1:42.17
2017	Brendan Brackan	8	Gary Carroll	Ger Lyons	1:42.48
2018	Zorion	4	Kevin Manning	Jim Bolger	1:41.91
2019	Flight Risk	8	Kevin Manning	Jim Bolger	1:41.08
2020	Saltonsall (Note: The 2020 race was run at Naas in November due to the COVID-19 pandemic in the Republic of Ireland)	6	Gavin Ryan	Adrian McGuinness	1:51.97
2021	Magnanimous	3	Shane Crosse	Joseph O'Brien	1:42.17
2022	Cadillac	4	Shane Foley	Jessica Harrington	1:53.20
2023	Moon De Vega	4	Billy Lee	Paddy Twomey	1:53.85
2024	Tarawa	4	Chris Hayes	Dermot Weld	1:55.27
2025	Green Impact	3	Shane Foley	Jessica Harrington	1:54.21
2026	Isaac Newton	3	Ryan Moore	Aidan O'Brien	1:53.81

== See also ==
- Horse racing in Ireland
- List of Irish flat horse races
