= Snow Fairy Stakes =

Flat horse race in Ireland

- Class: Group 3
- Location: Curragh Racecourse; County Kildare, Ireland
- Inaugurated: 2005
- Race type: Flat / Thoroughbred
- Website: Curragh

Race information
- Distance: 1m 1f (1,811 metres)
- Surface: Turf
- Track: Right-handed
- Qualification: Three-years-old and up fillies & mares
- Weight: 9 st 0 lb (3yo); 9 st 7 lb (4yo+); Penalties; 7 lb for Group 1 winners * 5 lb for Group 2 winners * 5 lb if two Group 3 wins * 3 lb if one Group 3 win * * since 1 January
- Purse: €55,000 (2022); 1st: €32,450

Snow Fairy Stakes
2026
Miss Scott	Faiyum	Sindria

Previous years
2025
Red Letter	Sand Gazelle	Barnavara
2024
Tarawa	Hanalia	Wingspan
2023
Red Riding Hood	American Sonja	Mashia
2022
Viareggio	Magic Chegaga	Juncture
2021
Acanella	Champers Elysees	Oodnadatta

2020-2011
2020
Thundering Nights	Albigna	Epona Plays
2019
Goddess	Credenza	Trethias
2018
I'm So Fancy	Desert Diamond	Hence
2017
Rain Goddess	Intimation	Dawn Of Hope
2016
Somehow	Epsom Icon	Skiffle
2015
Bocca Baciata	Easter	Brooch
2014
Carla Bianca	Pearl Of Africa	Alive Alive Oh
2013
Say	Aloof	Pearl Of Africa
2012
Up	Aloof	Ballybacka Lady
2011
Bible Belt	Wild Wind	Look At Me

2010-2005
2010
Obama Rule	Shareen	Miss Laa Di Da
2009
Chinese White	Latin Love	Festival Princess
2008
Beach Bunny	Deauville Vision	Finsceal Beo
2007
Many Colours	Magic Carpet	Navajo Moon
2006
Blessyourpinksox	Ardbrae Lady	Mississippi Star
2005
Chelsea Rose	Pictavia	Adaala

The Snow Fairy Fillies' Stakes is a Group 3 flat horse race in Ireland open to thoroughbred fillies and mares aged three years or older. It is run at the Curragh over a distance of 1 mile and 1 furlong (1,811 metres), and it is scheduled to take place each year in late August or early September.

The event was originally sponsored by Moyglare Stud and named after Dance Design, a successful Moyglare filly in the 1990s. It was established in 2005, and it was initially classed at Listed level. It was promoted to Group 3 status in 2009. In 2012 the race was sponsored by Lanwades Stud and run as the Lanwades Stud Fillies' Stakes. The 2014 running was sponsored by Xtravision and HMV in support of the Irish Autism Action charity. In 2016 the race was renamed after Snow Fairy, the winner of the Epsom Oaks and Irish Oaks in 2010.

== Records ==
Most successful horse:

- no horse has won this race more than once

Leading jockey (2 wins):

- Joseph O'Brien - Up (2012), Say (2013)
- Pat Smullen - Chinese White (2009), Carla Bianca (2014)
- Fran Berry - Bible Belt (2011), Bocca Baciata (2015)
- Ryan Moore - Rain Goddess (2017), Goddess (2019)
- Seamie Heffernan - Somehow (2016), Red Riding Hood (2023)
- Chris Hayes - Beach Bunny (2008), Tarawa (2024)

Leading trainer (6 wins):

- Aidan O'Brien - Up (2012), Say (2013), Somehow (2016), Rain Goddess (2017), Goddess (2019), Red Riding Hood (2023)

== Winners ==
Year	Winner	Age	Jockey	Trainer	Time
2005	Chelsea Rose	3	Pat Shanahan	Con Collins	1:49.20
2006	Blessyourpinksox	5	Ted Durcan	Peter Casey	1:51.60
2007	Many Colours	3	Kevin Manning	Jim Bolger	1:53.09
2008	Beach Bunny	3	Chris Hayes	Kevin Prendergast	2:03.44
2009	Chinese White	4	Pat Smullen	Dermot Weld	2:04.19
2010	Obama Rule	3	Declan McDonogh	Joanna Morgan	1:56.09
2011	Bible Belt	3	Fran Berry	Jessica Harrington	1:55.48
2012	Up	3	Joseph O'Brien	Aidan O'Brien	1:55.63
2013	Say	3	Joseph O'Brien	Aidan O'Brien	1:51.30
2014	Carla Bianca	3	Pat Smullen	Dermot Weld	1:56.90
2015	Bocca Baciata	3	Fran Berry	Jessica Harrington	1:55.31
2016	Somehow	3	Seamie Heffernan	Aidan O'Brien	1:53.01
2017	Rain Goddess	3	Ryan Moore	Aidan O'Brien	1:53.45
2018	I'm So Fancy	4	Colm O'Donoghue	Jessica Harrington	1:54.60
2019	Goddess	3	Ryan Moore	Aidan O'Brien	1:53.18
2020	Thundering Nights	3	Shane Crosse	Joseph O'Brien	2:04.67
2021	Acanella	3	Colin Keane	Ger Lyons	1:52.75
2022	Viareggio	3	Shane Foley	Jessica Harrington	1:53.61
2023	Red Riding Hood	3	Seamie Heffernan	Aidan O'Brien	1:54.60
2024	Tarawa	4	Chris Hayes	Dermot Weld	1:52.33
2025	Red Letter	3	Gary Carroll	Ger Lyons	1:51.29
2026	Miss Scott	3	Christophe Soumillon	John & Thady Gosden	1:52.79

== See also ==
- Horse racing in Ireland
- List of Irish flat horse races
