= UAE Derby =

Group 2 flat horse race

- Class: Group 2
- Location: Meydan Racecourse; Dubai, United Arab Emirates
- Inaugurated: 2000
- Race type: Thoroughbred – Flat racing

Race information
- Distance: 1,900 metres (1 3/16 miles)
- Surface: dirt, left-handed
- Qualification: 3-year-olds from the Northern & 4-year-olds from the Southern Hemisphere
- Weight: NH: 54.5kg. – SH: 59.5kg Allowance fillies 2kg.
- Purse: US$2,500,000

The UAE Derby is a Group 2 flat horse race in the United Arab Emirates for three-year-old thoroughbreds run over a distance of 1,900 metres (approximately 9.5 furlongs) on dirt at Meydan Racecourse in Dubai. It takes place annually during the Dubai World Cup Night on the last Saturday in March.

It was first run in 2000 and attained Group 2 status two years later. The distance of the race was increased to 2,000 metres (10 furlongs) in 2002, before reverting to 1,800 metres in 2004, and increased again to 1,900 meters in 2010. The race is open to both Northern and Southern Hemisphere three-year-olds.

The UAE Derby currently offers a purse of US$2.5 million. Considered a major race leading up to the Kentucky Derby in the United States, the top UAE Derby finishers received Kentucky Derby points from 2013 until 2024. Starting in 2025, the UAE Derby will be part of a separate series of Kentucky Derby prep races covering Europe and the Middle East.

== Records ==
Speed record:

- 1:47.04 – Express Tour (At former distance of 1,800 metres)
- 1:55.18 – Mendelssohn (over current distance of 1,900 metres)

Most wins by an owner:

- 9 – Godolphin Racing (2000, 2001, 2002, 2005, 2006, 2009, 2011, 2017, 2021)

Most wins by a jockey:

- 3 – Christophe Soumillon (2010, 2015, 2017)

Most wins by a trainer:

- 8 – Saeed bin Suroor (2000, 2001, 2002, 2005, 2006, 2009, 2011, 2017)

== Winners ==
Year	Winner	Jockey	Trainer	Owner	Time
2000	China Visit	Richard Hills	Saeed bin Suroor	Godolphin Racing	1:49.50
2001	Express Tour	David R. Flores	Saeed bin Suroor	Godolphin Racing	1:47.04
2002	Essence of Dubai	Frankie Dettori	Saeed bin Suroor	Godolphin Racing	2:02.90
2003	Victory Moon	Wayne Smith	Mike de Kock	Mad Syndicate	2:02.45
2004	Lundy's Liability	Weichong Marwing	Mike de Kock	Stud TNT & Mary Slack	1:50.83
2005	Blues and Royals	Kerrin McEvoy	Saeed bin Suroor	Godolphin Racing	1:50.05
2006	Discreet Cat	Frankie Dettori	Saeed bin Suroor	Godolphin Racing	1:48.59
2007	Asiatic Boy	Weichong Marwing	Mike de Kock	Sheikh M. bin Khalifa	1:48.82
2008	Honour Devil	Johnny Murtagh	Mike de Kock	Sheikh M. bin Khalifa	1:48.60
2009	Regal Ransom	Alan Garcia	Saeed bin Suroor	Godolphin Racing	1:50.00
2010	Musir	Christophe Soumillon	Mike de Kock	Mohammed bin Khalifa Al Maktoum	1:57.44
2011	Khawlah	Mickael Barzalona	Saeed bin Suroor	Godolphin Racing	1:58.83
2012	Daddy Long Legs	Colm O'Donoghue	Aidan O'Brien	Michael Tabor, John Magnier & Derrick Smith	1:58.35
2013	Lines of Battle*	Ryan Moore	Aidan O'Brien	Michael Tabor, John Magnier & Derrick Smith	2:02.05
2014	Toast of New York	Jamie Spencer	Jamie Osborne	Michael Buckley	1:57.92
2015	Mubtaahij	Christophe Soumillon	Mike de Kock	Mohammed bin Khalifa Al Maktoum	1:58.35
2016	Lani	Yutaka Take	Mikio Matsunaga	Yoko Maeda	1:58.41
2017	Thunder Snow	Christophe Soumillon	Saeed bin Suroor	Godolphin Racing	1:57.76
2018	Mendelssohn	Ryan Moore	Aidan O'Brien	Derrick Smith, Susan Magnier & Michael Tabor	1:55.19
2019	Plus Que Parfait	José Ortiz	Brendan Walsh	Imperial Racing	1:58.41
2020	Cancelled due to the COVID-19 pandemic.				
2021	Rebel's Romance	William Buick	Charlie Appleby	Godolphin Racing	1:56.28
2022	Crown Pride	Damian Lane	Koichi Shintani	Teruya Yoshida	1:59.76
2023	Derma Sotogake	Christophe Lemaire	Hidetaka Otonashi	Hiroyuki Asanuma	1:55.81
2024	Forever Young	Ryusei Sakai	Yoshito Yahagi	Susumu Fujita	1:57.89
2025	Admire Daytona	Christophe Lemaire	Yukihiro Kato	Junko Kondo	1:59.13
2026	Wonder Dean	Cristian Demuro	Daisuke Takayanagi	Yoshinari Yamamoto	1:59.19

- Lines of Battle was later renamed Helene Super Star

== See also ==
- Road to the Kentucky Derby
- List of United Arab Emirates horse races
