= Weld Park Stakes =

Flat horse race in Ireland

- Class: Group 3
- Location: Curragh Racecourse; County Kildare, Ireland
- Race type: Flat / Thoroughbred
- Sponsor: Dermot Weld
- Website: Curragh

Race information
- Distance: 7f (1,408 metres)
- Surface: Turf
- Track: Right-hand elbow
- Qualification: Two-year-old fillies
- Weight: 9 st 0 lb Penalties; 7 lb for Group 1 winners 5 lb for Group 2 winners 5 lb if two Group 3 wins 3 lb if one Group 3 win
- Purse: €51,700 (2022); 1st: €32,450

Weld Park Stakes
2026
Curracloe	Alpine Wedding	Damsel In Distress

Previous years
2025
Black Caviar Gold	Pivotal Attack	Minerva
2024
Heavens Gate	Fiery Lucy	Barnavara
2023
Caught U Looking	Sakti	Brilliant
2022
Basil Martini	Gan Teorainn	Keep In Touch
2021
Concert Hall	Sunset Shiraz	Seisai

2020-2011
2020
Elysium	Aunty Bridy	Thinking Of You
2019
New York Girl	A New Dawn	Know It All
2018
Hermosa	Foxtrot Liv	Chynna
2017
Ellthea	Sizzling	Ballet Shoes
2016
Eziyra	Grecian Light	Legitimus
2015
Coolmore	Anamba	Last Waltz
2014
Qualify	Lola Beaux	Stellar Glow
2013
My Titania	Chicago Girl	Tarfasha
2012
Magical Dream	Rawaaq	Uleavemebreathless
2011
Coral Wave	Homecoming Queen	Princess Sinead

2010-2001
2010
Chrysanthemum	Wild Wind	Bible Belt
2009
Lady Springbank	Bikini Babe	Corcovada
2008
Chintz	Lahaleeb	Hallie's Comet
2007
Eva's Request	Kyniska	Indiana Gal
2006
Arch Swing	Silk Dress	Impetious
2005
Ugo Fire	Abigail Pett	Kamarinskaya
2004
Jazz Princess	Saoire	Virginia Waters
2003
Venturi	Misty Heights	Opera Comique
2002
Rag Top	Feabhas	Finity
2001
Red Rioja	Lady Digby	Easy Sunshine

2000-1991
2000
Imagine	Katherine Seymour	Enrich
1999
Theoretically	Earlene	Aretha
1998
Rafayda	Dazzling Park	Polaire
1997
Alborada	Winona	Hoh Chi Min
1996
Token Gesture	Melleray	Absolute Glee
1995
Last Second	Super Gift	Ceirseach
1994
Ridgewood Pearl	Oh'Cecilia	Distant Lover
1993
Morcote	Razida	Fairy Water
1992
Asema	Miami Sands	Lady Ounavarra
1991
Tarwiya	Market Booster	Via Borghese

1990-1988
1990
Isle Of Glass	Spring To Light	Pennine Music
1989
Wedding Bouquet	Remthat Naser	In The Groove
1988
Tantum Ergo	Rahik	Sedulous

The Weld Park Stakes is a Group 3 flat horse race in Ireland open to two-year-old thoroughbred fillies. It is run at the Curragh over a distance of 7 furlongs (1,408 metres), and it is scheduled to take place each year in September or October.

== History ==
The event was originally held at Phoenix Park, and it used to be contested over a mile. For a period it was called the Wexford Stakes, and it was later renamed the Park Stakes. It was shortened to 7 furlongs in 1971.

The trainer Dermot Weld started to sponsor the race in the 1980s, and it was subsequently run in memory of his father Charlie Weld (also a trainer). The C. L. Weld Park Stakes was transferred to the Curragh in 1991. In 2014 the name of Dermot Weld's mother, Marguerite, was added to the race title and it became the C. L. & M. F. Weld Park Stakes. Since 2018 it has been run as the Weld Park Stakes.

Notable winners of the race have included Ridgewood Pearl, Alborada, Imagine and Qualify.

== Records ==
Leading jockey since 1965 (7 wins):

- Michael Kinane – Lone Bidder (1980), Countess Candy (1982), Gaily Gaily (1985), Trusted Partner (1987), Asema (1992), Arch Swing (2006), Eva's Request (2007)

Leading trainer since 1965 (7 wins):

- John Oxx – Isle of Glass (1990), Tarwiya (1991), Morcote (1993), Ridgewood Pearl (1994), Rafayda (1998), Arch Swing (2006), My Titania (2013)
- Aidan O'Brien - Imagine (2000), Magical Dream (2012), Qualify (2014), Coolmore (2015), Hermosa (2018), Concert Hall (2021), Heavens Gate (2024)

== Winners since 1980 ==
Year	Winner	Jockey	Trainer	Time
1980	Lone Bidder	Michael Kinane	Michael Kauntze
1981	More Heather	Peadar Matthews	Liam Browne	1:30.10
1982	Countess Candy	Michael Kinane	Liam Browne	1:29.30
1983	Ballet de France	Christy Roche	David O'Brien
1984	Jolly Saint	George McGrath	Paul Doyle
1985	Gaily Gaily	Michael Kinane	Dermot Weld	1:23.40
1986	Sea Dara	John Matthias	Ian Balding	1:23.60
1987	Trusted Partner	Michael Kinane	Dermot Weld	1:31.60
1988	Tantum Ergo	Richard Quinn	Edward Lynam	1:22.60
1989	Wedding Bouquet	John Reid	Vincent O'Brien	1:20.10
1990	Isle of Glass	Ron Quinton	John Oxx	1:21.00
1991	Tarwiya	Johnny Murtagh	John Oxx	1:31.90
1992	Asema	Michael Kinane	Dermot Weld	1:32.60
1993	Morcote	Dermot Hogan	John Oxx	1:31.00
1994	Ridgewood Pearl	Johnny Murtagh	John Oxx	1:32.90
1995	Last Second	George Duffield	Sir Mark Prescott	1:28.20
1996	Token Gesture	Pat Smullen	Dermot Weld	1:26.20
1997	Alborada	Seb Sanders	Sir Mark Prescott	1:26.10
1998	Rafayda	Johnny Murtagh	John Oxx	1:36.30
1999	Theoretically	Pat Smullen	Dermot Weld	1:33.90
2000	Imagine	Paul Scallan	Aidan O'Brien	1:32.90
2001	Red Rioja	Fran Berry	Eoghan O'Neill	1:32.20
2002	Rag Top	Dane O'Neill	Richard Hannon Sr.	1:25.10
2003	Venturi	Richard Hughes	David Wachman	1:25.50
2004	Jazz Princess	Niall McCullagh	Jessica Harrington	1:26.70
2005	Ugo Fire	Declan McDonogh	Kevin Prendergast	1:29.20
2006	Arch Swing	Michael Kinane	John Oxx	1:27.10
2007	Eva's Request	Michael Kinane	Mick Channon	1:30.25
2008	Chintz	Seamie Heffernan	David Wachman	1:25.89
2009	Lady Springbank	Willie Supple	Paul Deegan	1:24.02
2010	Chrysanthemum	Wayne Lordan	David Wachman	1:28.96
2011	Coral Wave	Declan McDonogh	Patrick Prendergast	1:32.90
2012	Magical Dream	Joseph O'Brien	Aidan O'Brien	1:33.66
2013	My Titania	Declan McDonogh	John Oxx	1:24.20
2014	Qualify	Joseph O'Brien	Aidan O'Brien	1:22.65
2015	Coolmore	Joseph O'Brien	Aidan O'Brien	1:27.12
2016	Eziyra	Pat Smullen	Dermot Weld	1:30.36
2017	Ellthea (Note: The 2017 and 2018 runnings took place at Naas due to redevelopment work at The Curragh)	Colm O'Donoghue	Karl Burke	1:30.23
2018	Hermosa	Ryan Moore	Aidan O'Brien	1:26.52
2019	New York Girl	Shane Crosse	Joseph O'Brien	1:30.14
2020	Elysium	Billy Lee	Noel Meade	1:28.17
2021	Concert Hall	Seamie Heffernan	Aidan O'Brien	1:26.70
2022	Basil Martini	Declan McDonogh	Joseph O'Brien	1:27.20
2023	Caught U Looking	Ben Coen	Noel Meade	1:30.33
2024	Heavens Gate	Ryan Moore	Aidan O'Brien	1:30.15
2025	Black Caviar Gold	Billy Lee	Paddy Twomey	1:29.38
2026	Curracloe	Ben Coen	Johnny Murtagh	1:28.30

== Earlier winners ==
- 1965: Crystal Light *
- 1966: Graunuaile
- 1967: Windy Gay
- 1968: Another Daughter
- 1969: Royal Words
- 1970: Three Roses
- 1971: Al-Burak
- 1972: Fiery Diplomat
- 1973: Silk Buds
- 1974: Small World
- 1975: Capricious
- 1976: All Serene
- 1977: Turkish Treasure
- 1978: Solar
- 1979: Mulvilla

* Moon Dancer finished first in 1965, but she was disqualified.

== See also ==
- Horse racing in Ireland
- List of Irish flat horse races
