= Treasure Beach (horse) =

British-bred Thoroughbred racehorse

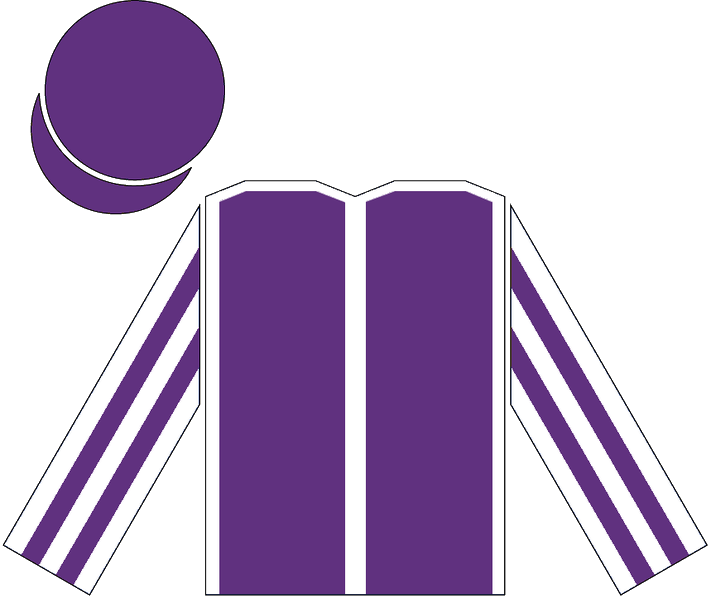
- Racing silks of Derrick Smith
- Sire: Galileo
- Grandsire: Sadler's Wells
- Dam: Honorine
- Damsire: Mark of Esteem
- Sex: Stallion
- Foaled: 25 March 2008
- Country: United Kingdom
- Colour: Bay
- Breeder: Ashley House Stud
- Owner: Coolmore Stud
- Trainer: Aidan O'Brien→Mike de Kock
- Record: 19: 5-4-2
- Earnings: £1,509,028

Major wins
- Chester Vase (2011); Irish Derby (2011); Secretariat Stakes (2011)

Treasure Beach (foaled 2008) is a British-bred, Irish-trained Thoroughbred racehorse and winner of the 2011 Irish Derby. He was ridden by Colm O'Donoghue and trained by Aidan O'Brien. Earlier in 2011, he placed second in the Epsom Derby. In 2011, he also won the Secretariate Stakes (Gr. 2). Treasure Beach retired from racing in 2013.
