= Thundering Nights =

Irish Thoroughbred racehorse

- Sire: Night of Thunder
- Grandsire: Dubawi
- Dam: Cape Castle
- Damsire: Cape Cross
- Sex: Mare
- Foaled: 19 March 2017
- Country: Ireland
- Colour: Bay
- Breeder: Manjri Farm
- Owner: Shapoor Mistry
- Trainer: Joseph Patrick O'Brien
- Record: 11: 4-3-1
- Earnings: £302,271

Major wins
- Snow Fairy Stakes (2020); Pretty Polly Stakes (2021)

Thundering Nights (foaled 19 March 2017) is an Irish Thoroughbred racehorse. After winning one minor race from three attempts as a two-year-old she made progress in the following year when she took the Group 3 Snow Fairy Stakes and ran third in the Blandford Stakes. She made further improvement as a four-year-old when she was narrowly beaten in the New York Stakes before winning the Group 1 Pretty Polly Stakes.

== Background ==
Thundering Nights is a bay mare with a broad white blaze and two white socks bred in Ireland by Manjri Farm, an Indian breeding operation owned by Shapoor Mistry. As a foal in November 2017 she was offered for sale at Goffs, but failed to reach her €17,000 reserve price. In September of the following year she returned to the sales ring at Tattersalls but again failed to reach her reserve, which was set on this occasion at €19,000. The filly was sent into training with Joseph Patrick O'Brien at Owning Hill, County Kilkenny.

She was from the first crop of foals sired by Night of Thunder who won the 2000 Guineas in 2014 and the Lockinge Stakes in the following year. Thundering Nights is the first foal of her dam Cape Castle who showed modest ability on the track, winning four minor races in England as a four-year-old in 2015. She was a granddaughter of Cloud Castle who won the Nell Gwyn Stakes and was closely related to Kris Kin, Warrsan and the multiple Group 1 winner Luso.

== Racing career ==
=== 2019: two-year-old season ===
Thundering Nights began her racing career by finishing unplaced in a maiden race over one mile on heavy ground at the Curragh on 29 September. After finishing fourth in a similar event at Gowran Park on 14 October she started a 14/1 outsider for a maiden over eight and a half furlongs at Galway Racecourse two weeks later. Ridden by the apprentice jockey Shane Crosse she raced in seventh place before making steady progress in the straight and gained the advantage inside the final furlong to win by half a length from the odds-on favourite Mazara.

=== 2020: three-year-old season ===
The 2020 flat racing season in Ireland was disrupted by the COVID-19 and Thundering Nights did not resume her racing career until 18 July when she was beaten a short head by the gelding Sonnyboyliston in a Handicap over ten furlongs at the Curragh. On 6 August she was partnered by Crosse when she started favourite in a minor race over nine furlongs at Leopardstown Racecourse and won by one and a half lengths from Amma Grace after taking the lead approaching the final furlong. The filly was then stepped up in class for the Group 3 Snow Fairy Stakes over nine furlongs on soft ground at the Curragh and started the 7/2 second choice in the betting behind Albigna in an eight-runner field. With Crosse again in the saddle she tracked the leaders before taking the lead a furlong out and winning "comfortably" by one and a half lengths from the favourite. O'Brien's assistant trainer Brendan Powell commented "She's improving. She toughed it out well the last time in Leopardstown and is getting bigger and stronger all the time. She loves that ground. Shane said she's very relaxed and you never really know how well you’re travelling... She will stay further."

On 13 September Thundering Nights started at 9/1 for the Group 2 Blandford Stakes over ten furlongs at the Curragh and finished third behind Cayenne Pepper and Amma Grace. For her final run of the year she was sent to England for the Group 1 British Champions Fillies & Mares Stakes over one and a half miles at Ascot Racecourse in October and came home seventh of the twelve runners behind Wonderful Tonight, beaten eleven lengths by the winner.

=== 2021: four-year-old season ===
Thundering Nights began her third campaign on 17 April when she was matched against male opposition in the Group 3 Alleged Stakes at the Curragh. She took the lead approaching the final furlong but was overtaken in the closing stages and beaten half a length by the five-year-old Broome. The filly was then sent to the United Stakes to contest the Grade II New York Stakes at Belmont Park on 4 June when she was partnered by John Velasquez and started at odds of 4.3/1 in a nine-runner field. Racing in heavy rain, Thundering Nights turned into the straight in fourth place before finishing strongly but failed by a nose to catch the front-running Mean Mary. Velazquez commented, "I was stuck behind the two horses in front of me, and it took me a long time to get her going. Once she got loose, she came running but it was too late."

On 27 June Thundering Nights was back at the Curragh for the Group 1 Pretty Polly Stakes and started the 3.2/1 third favourite behind Cayenne Pepper and the three-year-old Santa Barbara in an eight-runner field which also included Shale, Epona Plays (Lanwades Stud Stakes) and Insinuendo (Blue Wind Stakes). After tracking the leaders Crosse sent the filly up to overtake the front-running Epona Plays approaching the final furlong. In the closing stages Thundering Nights was strongly pressed by Santa Barbara but stayed on well to prevail by a neck from her younger rival. After the race Joseph O'Brien said "She's a great mare. She's very tough and every time you ask her a question she rises to the occasion. She's never run a bad race really... She always has a bit of a look around when she goes to the front and she did that again today but when the other one came to her she really fought back... She was a bit unlucky in America and would have won in another stride. The tight track caught her out a little bit as it was her first time around the bends over there. She had to spend a week over there after the race so she's only been back a couple of weeks. She trained there for a week, then shipped straight back and came straight here. She has a great constitution."

== Pedigree ==
Pedigree of Thundering Nights (IRE), bay filly, 2017
| Sire Night of Thunder (IRE) 2011 | Dubawi (IRE); 2002 | Dubai Millennium (GB) | Seeking The Gold (USA) |
| Sire Night of Thunder (IRE) 2011 | Dubawi (IRE); 2002 | Dubai Millennium (GB) | Colorado Dancer (IRE) |
| Sire Night of Thunder (IRE) 2011 | Dubawi (IRE); 2002 | Zomaradah (GB) | Deploy |
| Sire Night of Thunder (IRE) 2011 | Dubawi (IRE); 2002 | Zomaradah (GB) | Jawaher (IRE) |
| Sire Night of Thunder (IRE) 2011 | Forest Storm (GB); 2006 | Galileo (IRE) | Sadler's Wells (USA) |
| Sire Night of Thunder (IRE) 2011 | Forest Storm (GB); 2006 | Galileo (IRE) | Urban Sea (USA) |
| Sire Night of Thunder (IRE) 2011 | Forest Storm (GB); 2006 | Quiet Storm (IRE) | Desert Prince |
| Sire Night of Thunder (IRE) 2011 | Forest Storm (GB); 2006 | Quiet Storm (IRE) | Hertford Castle (GB) |
| Dam Cape Castle (IRE) 2011 | Cape Cross (IRE); 1996 | Green Desert (USA) | Danzig |
| Dam Cape Castle (IRE) 2011 | Cape Cross (IRE); 1996 | Green Desert (USA) | Foreign Courier |
| Dam Cape Castle (IRE) 2011 | Cape Cross (IRE); 1996 | Park Appeal (IRE) | Ahonoora (GB) |
| Dam Cape Castle (IRE) 2011 | Cape Cross (IRE); 1996 | Park Appeal (IRE) | Balidaress |
| Dam Cape Castle (IRE) 2011 | Kaabari (USA); 2006 | Seeking The Gold | Mr Prospector |
| Dam Cape Castle (IRE) 2011 | Kaabari (USA); 2006 | Seeking The Gold | Con Game |
| Dam Cape Castle (IRE) 2011 | Kaabari (USA); 2006 | Cloud Castle (GB) | In The Wings |
| Dam Cape Castle (IRE) 2011 | Kaabari (USA); 2006 | Cloud Castle (GB) | Lucayan Princess (IRE) (Family: 7-a) |

- Thundering Nights is inbred 3 × 4 to Seeking The Gold, meaning that this stallion appears in both the third and fourth generations of her pedigree.
