= Qualify (horse) =

Irish-bred Thoroughbred racehorse

- Racing silks of Louis & Kate Ronan and Chantal Regalado-Gonzalez
- Sire: Fastnet Rock
- Grandsire: Danehill
- Dam: Perihelion
- Damsire: Galileo
- Sex: Mare
- Foaled: 22 April 2012
- Country: Ireland
- Color: Bay
- Breeder: Whisperview Trading Ltd
- Owner: Louis & Kate Ronan; Chantal Regalado-Gonzalez
- Trainer: Aidan O'Brien
- Record: 11: 3-0-1
- Earnings: £316,185

Major wins
- C. L. Weld Park Stakes (2014); Epsom Oaks (2015)

Qualify (foaled 22 April 2012) is an Irish Thoroughbred racehorse. On 5 June 2015 she was a 50/1 winner of The Oaks. She ran seven times as a juvenile in 2014, winning a maiden race and the Group Three C. L. Weld Park Stakes but was well-beaten when tried against the best fillies of her generation in the Moyglare Stud Stakes and the Breeders' Cup Juvenile Fillies Turf. In the spring of 2015 she was initially disappointing as she finished unplaced in both the 1000 Guineas and the Irish 1,000 Guineas before being stepped up in distance and winning the Oaks.

== Background ==
Qualify is a bay filly with a white star bred in Ireland by Whisperview Trading Ltd a company wholly owned by the trainer Aidan O'Brien and his wife Anne Marie. She was sired by the Australian stallion Fastnet Rock who sired many leading horses including Foxwedge and Atlantic Jewel in the Southern hemisphere before moving to the Coolmore Stud in Ireland. Qualify's dam Perihelion won one minor race from fourteen starts but finished second in the Park Hill Stakes as a three-year-old in 2008. Perihelion was a granddaughter of the broodmare Media Luna, whose other descendants have included Workforce, Brian Boru and the Kentucky Oaks winner Flute. Qualify was sent into training with O'Brien at Ballydoyle.

== Racing career ==
=== 2014: two-year-old season ===
As a two-year-old, Qualify raced in the ownership of Louis & Kate Ronan. On her racecourse debut she finished fourth when a 20/1 outsider for a maiden race at the Curragh on 27 June. Despite her defeat she was moved up in class to contest the Group Three Silver Flash Stakes at Leopardstown Racecourse a month later and finished third to Jack Naylor (a filly despite her name) after leading for most of the race. When dropped back to maiden company at Dundalk Racecourse on 17 August she started odds-on favourite and recorded her first success, leading all the way and winning "comfortably" by five and a half lengths from eight opponents. Seven days later in the Group Two Debutante Stakes, she raced in second place before weakening in the closing stages and finishing fifth behind Raydara.

In September Qualify was moved up to the highest class for the Group One Moyglare Stud Stakes. Ridden by Michael Hussey, she started at odds of 50/1 and after leading approaching the final furlong she dropped away to finish fifth behind the British-trained Cursory Glance, who won from Lucida and Found. Two weeks later, Qualify started 9/4 second favourite, behind the Jim Bolger-trained Stellar Glow for the Group Three C L Weld Park Stakes over seven furlongs at the Curragh. Ridden by her trainer's son Joseph O'Brien, she was towards the rear in the early stages but took the lead in the final furlong and drew away to win by three lengths and a short head from Lola Beaux and Stellar Glow.

On her final appearance of the season, Qualify was sent to California to contest the Breeders' Cup Juvenile Fillies Turf at Santa Anita Park. Ridden by Ryan Moore she was hampered on the final turn and eased down in the straight, finishing eighth behind Lady Eli.

=== 2015: three-year-old season ===
Before the start of her second season, Qualify entered the ownership of Chantal Consuela Regalado-Gonzalez. On her three-year-old debut, the filly was sent to England to contest the 2015 1000 Guineas over the Rowley Mile at Newmarket Racecourse on 3 May. Starting at odds of 12/1 she never looked likely to win and finished last of the thirteen runners behind another Irish filly Legatissimo. In the Irish 1000 Guineas three weeks later she started at 50/1 and again never threatened to win, finishing tenth of the eighteen runners behind the Bolger-trained Pleascach, who won by half a length from Found.

On 5 June, Qualify, running for the tenth time, was the most experienced of the eleven fillies to contest the 237th running of the Oaks Stakes over one and a half miles at Epsom Downs Racecourse. Ridden for the first time by Colm O'Donoghue she started the complete outsider of the field at odds of 50/1 whilst Legatissimo was made favourite ahead of Jack Naylor and the leading British hopes Crystal Zvezda and Lady of Dubai. She was not among the early leaders and was eighth on the turn into the straight before making progress two furlongs from the finish. She moved into second behind the clear leader Legatissimo a furlong out and produced a strong late run to catch the favourite in the last stride and win by a short head. O'Donoghue, who was recording his first win in a British Classic said: "Qualify has travelled, she is well balanced and I just wanted to keep her relaxed and come with that clean, straight run. It's the winning post that matters. She has come home strong."

Qualify's Oaks win entitled her to a free entry for the Irish Derby on 27 June and O'Brien took advantage of this to race her against colts for the first time. Ridden again by O'Donoghue she raced in last place and made steady progress in the straight without ever looking likely to challenge the leaders, eventually finishing sixth of the eight runners behind the favourite Jack Hobbs.

== Pedigree ==
Pedigree of Qualify (IRE), bay filly, 2012
Sire Fastnet Rock (AUS) 2001	Danehill (USA); 1986	Danzig	Northern Dancer
Sire Fastnet Rock (AUS) 2001	Danehill (USA); 1986	Danzig	Pas de Nom
Sire Fastnet Rock (AUS) 2001	Danehill (USA); 1986	Razvana	His Majesty
Sire Fastnet Rock (AUS) 2001	Danehill (USA); 1986	Razvana	Spring Adieu
Sire Fastnet Rock (AUS) 2001	Piccadilly Circus (AUS); 1995	Royal Academy	Nijinsky
Sire Fastnet Rock (AUS) 2001	Piccadilly Circus (AUS); 1995	Royal Academy	Crimson Saint
Sire Fastnet Rock (AUS) 2001	Piccadilly Circus (AUS); 1995	Gatana	Marauding
Sire Fastnet Rock (AUS) 2001	Piccadilly Circus (AUS); 1995	Gatana	Twigalae
Dam Perihelion (IRE) 2005	Galileo (IRE); 1998	Sadler's Wells	Northern Dancer
Dam Perihelion (IRE) 2005	Galileo (IRE); 1998	Sadler's Wells	Fairy Bridge
Dam Perihelion (IRE) 2005	Galileo (IRE); 1998	Urban Sea	Miswaki
Dam Perihelion (IRE) 2005	Galileo (IRE); 1998	Urban Sea	Allegretta
Dam Perihelion (IRE) 2005	Medicosma (USA); 1986	The Minstrel	Northern Dancer
Dam Perihelion (IRE) 2005	Medicosma (USA); 1986	The Minstrel	Fleur
Dam Perihelion (IRE) 2005	Medicosma (USA); 1986	Media Luna	Star Appeal
Dam Perihelion (IRE) 2005	Medicosma (USA); 1986	Media Luna	Sounion (Family 14-c)

- Qualify is inbred 4 × 4 × 4 to Northern Dancer, meaning that this stallion appears three times in the fourth generation of her pedigree.
