= Ballyroan Stakes =

Flat horse race in Ireland

- Class: Group 3
- Location: Leopardstown; County Dublin, Ireland
- Inaugurated: 1991
- Race type: Flat / Thoroughbred
- Sponsor: Tote Ireland
- Website: Leopardstown

Race information
- Distance: 1m 4f (2,414 metres)
- Surface: Turf
- Track: Left-handed
- Qualification: Three-years-old and up
- Weight: 8 st 13 lb (3yo); 9 st 9 lb (4yo+); Allowances; 3 lb for fillies and mares Penalties; 5 lb for G1 / G2 winners * 3 lb for G3 winners * * since 1 January
- Purse: €60,000 (2025); 1st: €35,400

Ballyroan Stakes
2026
Ethical Diamond	Green Impact	Gaucher

Previous years
2025
Sons And Lovers	Crystal Black	Siege Of Troy
2024
Crystal Black	The Euphrates	Safecracker
2023
Vauban	Valiant King	Peking Opera
2022
Gear Up	Cleveland	Beamish
2021
Tarnawa	Silence Please	Hector De Maris

2020-2011
2020
Nickajack Cave	Fresnel	Mythical
2019
Latrobe	Guaranteed	Broad Street
2018
Eziyra	Stellar Mass	Yucatan
2017
Spanish Steps	Johannes Vermeer	Stellar Mass
2016
Stellar Mass	Almela	Bondi Beach
2015
Fields Of Athenry	Edelpour	Roheryn
2014
Eye of The Storm	Roheryn	Streetcar To Stars
2013
Ernest Hemingway	Royal Diamond	Scintillula
2012
Galileo's Choice	Massiyn	Bible Belt
2011
Sense Of Purpose	Marksmanship	Bob Le Beau

2010-2001
2010
Profound Beauty	Akzar	Indiana Gal
2009
Profound Beauty	Mourayan	Shreyas
2008
Mores Wells	Washington Irving	Profound Beauty
2007
Mores Wells	Fracas	Arch Rebel
2006
Kastoria	Foreign Affairs	Good Surprise
2005
Chelsea Rose	Shalapour	Vinnie Roe
2004
Foreign Affairs	Vinnie Roe	Mkuzi
2003
Vinnie Roe	Carpanetto	Behrasia
2002
Vinnie Roe	Millstreet	Bowmore
2001
Sadlers Wings	Masilia	Chiming

2000-1991
2000
Grand Finale	Palace Royale	Rostropovich
1999
Peach Out Of Reach	Golden Rule	Catherina
1998
Sunshine Street	Beldarian	Geisha Girl
1997
Gordi	Carnelly	Chania
1996
Zafzala	Fill The Bill	Ceirseach
1995
Golden Orb	Ballykett Nancy	Damancher
1994
Karikata	Tryarra	Poetical Justice
1993
Approach The Bench	Krisdaline	Ormsby
1992
Dabtiya	Mining Tycoon	Malvernico
1991
George Augustus	Approach The Bench	Rimpa

The Ballyroan Stakes is a Group 3 flat horse race in Ireland open to horses aged three years or older. It is run at Leopardstown over a distance of 1 mile and 4 furlongs (2,414 metres), and it is scheduled to take place each year in August.

The event was established in 1991, and it was originally classed at Listed level. It was initially contested over 1 mile and 2 furlongs, and it was extended to its present length in 1995. It was promoted to Group 3 status in 2007.

== Records ==
Most successful horse (2 wins):

- Vinnie Roe – 2002, 2003
- Mores Wells – 2007, 2008
- Profound Beauty – 2009, 2010

Leading jockey (7 wins):

- Pat Smullen – Grand Finale (2000), Vinnie Roe (2002, 2003), Profound Beauty (2009, 2010), Sense of Purpose (2011), Galileo's Choice (2012)

Leading trainer (10 wins):

- Dermot Weld – Gordi (1997), Grand Finale (2000), Vinnie Roe (2002, 2003), Profound Beauty (2009, 2010), Sense of Purpose (2011), Galileo's Choice (2012), Eziyra (2018), Tarnawa(2021)

== Winners ==
Year	Winner	Age	Jockey	Trainer	Time
1991	George Augustus	3	Johnny Murtagh	John Oxx	2:04.90
1992	Dabtiya	3	Walter Swinburn	John Oxx	2:06.70
1993	Approach the Bench	5	John Reid	John Mulhern	2:10.80
1994	Karikata	3	Johnny Murtagh	John Oxx	2:09.00
1995	Golden Orb	3	Christy Roche	Charles O'Brien	2:31.00
1996	Zafzala	3	Johnny Murtagh	John Oxx	2:32.90
1997	Gordi	4	Michael Kinane	Dermot Weld	2:34.90
1998	Sunshine Street	3	Johnny Murtagh	Noel Meade	2:35.80
1999	Peach Out of Reach	3	Michael Kinane	Aidan O'Brien	2:48.60
2000	Grand Finale	3	Pat Smullen	Dermot Weld	2:33.40
2001	Sadlers Wings	3	Pat Shanahan	Willie Mullins	2:35.70
2002	Vinnie Roe	4	Pat Smullen	Dermot Weld	2:31.60
2003	Vinnie Roe	5	Pat Smullen	Dermot Weld	2:34.80
2004	Foreign Affairs	6	Jimmy Quinn	Sir Mark Prescott	2:34.30
2005	Chelsea Rose	3	Pat Shanahan	Con Collins	2:31.90
2006	Kastoria	5	Michael Kinane	John Oxx	2:33.10
2007	Mores Wells	3	Declan McDonogh	Kevin Prendergast	2:36.58
2008	Mores Wells	4	Declan McDonogh	Kevin Prendergast	2:40.24
2009	Profound Beauty	5	Pat Smullen	Dermot Weld	2:30.48
2010	Profound Beauty	6	Pat Smullen	Dermot Weld	2:30.70
2011	Sense of Purpose	4	Pat Smullen	Dermot Weld	2:36.39
2012	Galileo's Choice	6	Pat Smullen	Dermot Weld	2:34.82
2013	Ernest Hemingway	4	Joseph O'Brien	Aidan O'Brien	2:32.04
2014	Eye of the Storm	4	Joseph O'Brien	Aidan O'Brien	2:31.94
2015	Fields Of Athenry	3	Seamie Heffernan	Aidan O'Brien	2:31.68
2016	Stellar Mass	3	Kevin Manning	Jim Bolger	2:36.90
2017	Spanish Steps	3	Seamie Heffernan	Aidan O'Brien	2:37.87
2018	Eziyra	4	Declan McDonogh	Dermot Weld	2:37.18
2019	Latrobe	4	Donnacha O'Brien	Joseph O'Brien	2:35.53
2020	Nickajack Cave	4	Gary Carroll	Ger Lyons	2:36.37
2021	Tarnawa	5	Colin Keane	Dermot Weld	2:36.45
2022	Gear Up	4	Dylan Browne McMonagle	Joseph O'Brien	2:39.07
2023	Vauban (Note: The 2023 race took place at Naas)	5	Colin Keane	Willie Mullins	2:35.41
2024	Crystal Black	6	Colin Keane	Gerard Keane	2:31.82
2025	Sons And Lovers	4	Dylan Browne McMonagle	Joseph O'Brien	2:39.80
2026	Ethical Diamond	6	Ryan Moore	Willie Mullins	2:30.33

== See also ==
- Horse racing in Ireland
- List of Irish flat horse races
