= Sligo Racecourse =

Horse racing venue in Ireland

Sligo Racecourse is a horse racing venue in Sligo, Ireland which stages both National Hunt and flat racing. The course is a right-handed track on a one-mile circuit. Racing has taken place at the course since 1955, although it has taken place locally since 1781. The racecourse is located in Cleveragh, about 0.75 mile (1 km) from the town, and hosts around eight race days per year.
