= Colm O'Donoghue =

Irish jockey

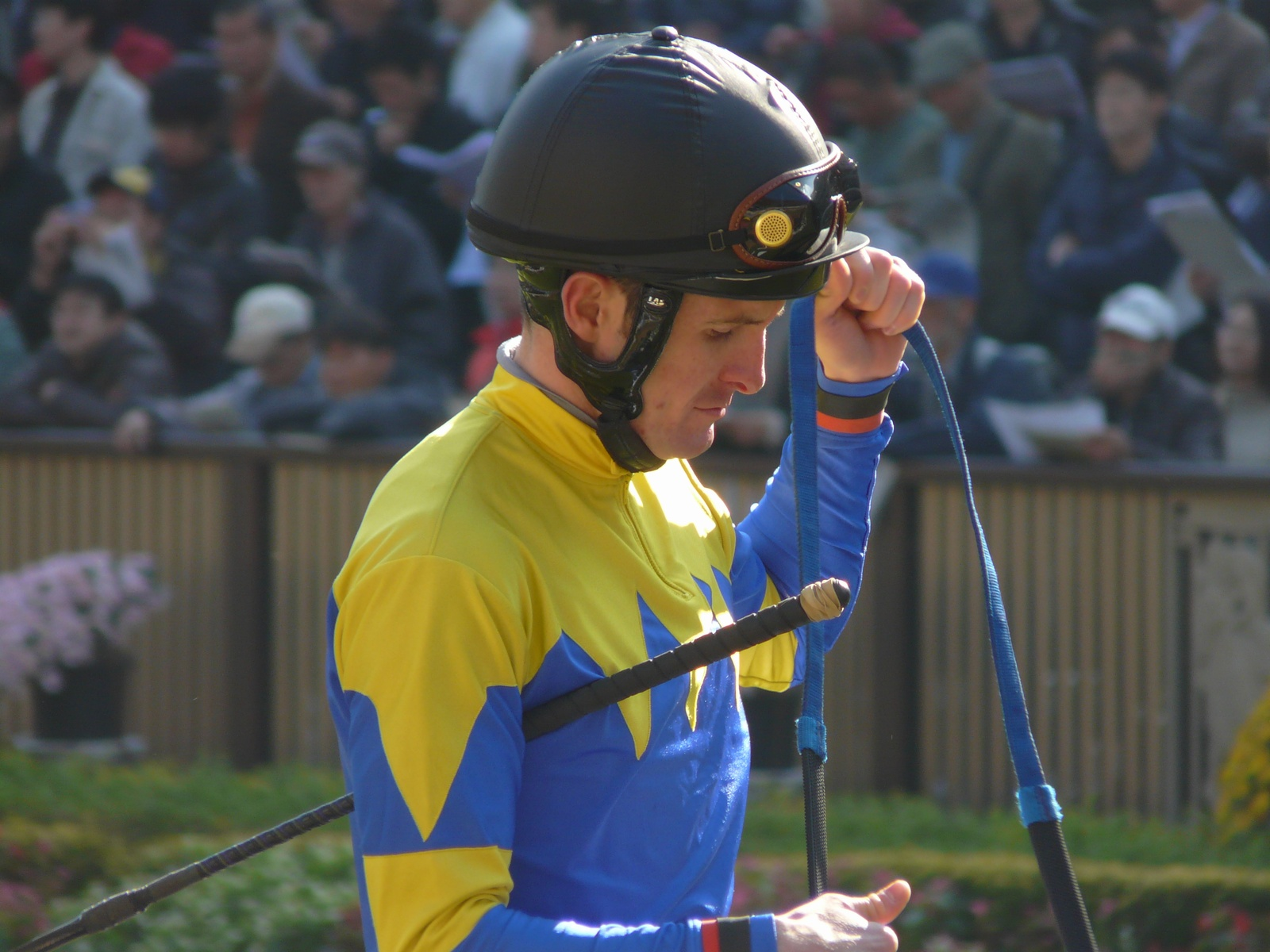
- Jockey Colm O'Donoghue

Personal information
- Born: 13 November 1980 (age 45) Buttevant, County Cork, Ireland
- Occupation: Jockey

Horse racing career
- Sport: Horse racing

Major racing wins
- Major race wins: Irish Derby (2011); Irish Oaks (2014); Phoenix Stakes (2002); Epsom Oaks (2015); Yorkshire Oaks (2016); Secretariat Stakes (2011); Queen Elizabeth II Challenge Cup Stakes (2011); Poule d'Essai des Poulains (2007); Critérium International (2009); UAE Derby (2012); Canadian International (2012); Irish 1,000 Guineas (2018); Prix Jacques Le Marois (2018); Coronation Stakes (2018); Falmouth Stakes (2018)

Significant horses
- Alpha Centauri, Treasure Beach, Daddy Long Legs, Joshua Tree, Qualify

Colm O'Donoghue (born 13 November 1980) is an Irish jockey. For most of his career, he was based at the Ballydoyle racing stables in Rosegreen, Cashel, County Tipperary.

== Career ==
In his final days as a schoolboy in 1996, O'Donoghue rang Aidan O'Brien to ask to be his apprentice. O'Brien agreed. The association continued for two decades.

O'Donoghue rode his first winner, My Lorraine, at Sligo in 1997. Less than a week later he partnered Theano to a surprise win in the valuable John Roarty Memorial Scurry Handicap at the Curragh on Derby Day, one of the most competitive handicaps of the season. Other trainers began to use him on a regular basis and in October 1999, he partnered Zelden to success in the Derrinstown Stud Apprentice Handicap final at the Curragh. Since then he has won numerous listed, group and other major races in Ireland including the Phoenix Stakes, Noblesse Stakes, Greenlands Stakes, Round Tower Stakes, Debutante Stakes, Ulster Derby, the Irish Cesarewich and the McDonagh Handicap at the Galway Festival.

In 2011, O'Donoghue rode the Aidan O'Brien trained Treasure Beach in The Derby, finishing second by a head. Mick Kinane described O'Donoghue's performance on the horse as the best ride in the race. He then won the Irish Derby at the Curragh Racecourse on the same horse. This was his second European classic success following victory in the Poule d'Essai des Poulains, which he won on Astronomer Royal in 2007.

Two months later, in August 2011, he won the Shergar Cup at Ascot as a member of the victorious Irish Jockeys' team, winning the 12 furlong Shergar Cup Classic race on Parlour Games, his first ride for Godolphin. In November he was nominated for an Outstanding Achievement Award by Horse Racing Ireland.

In January 2012, he was invited to represent Ireland in the Meydan Masters International jockeys challenge in Dubai and in March won the UAE Derby on Daddy Long Legs at the Dubai Carnival meeting.

O'Donoghue has ridden for many leading trainers and owners including Aidan O'Brien, Jessica Harrington, Jim Bolger, Dermot Weld and John Oxx in Ireland, Bobby Frankel, Neil Drysdale, Bob Baffert and Todd Pletcher in the US, Lee Freedman in Australia, Dr MAM Ramaswamy, Subaiah Ganapathy and Vijay Mallya in India and Katsuhiko Sumii in Japan.

He also won the inaugural running of the American St. Leger at the Arlington Million meeting at Arlington Park in Arlington Heights, Illinois, in August 2012. O'Donoghue won the race on Jakkalberry for the Newmarket based trainer, Marco Botti.

From 2016, he replaced Fran Berry (who had moved to England) as first jockey on the flat for dual-purpose trainer Jessica Harrington, initially mixing that role with his Ballydoyle position. He rode his first Royal Ascot winner, Sword fighter, for Aidan O'Brien in the Queen's Vase in 2016. In 2018, he rode the Harrington-trained Alpha Centauri to win four Group One races, including one at Royal Ascot.

O'Donoghue also established a relationship with Godolphin, riding for trainer Charlie Appleby at all eight Dubai World Cup Carnival meetings in 2019.

In February 2019, it was announced that Shane Foley would replace O'Donoghue as the Harrington stable jockey. By the following month, it had been announced that O'Donoghue would be used by the new training partnership of John Oxx and Patrick Prendergast.

== Major wins ==
Ireland

- Irish 1,000 Guineas – (1) – Alpha Centauri (2018)
- Irish Derby – (1) – Treasure Beach (2011)
- Irish Oaks – (1) – Bracelet (2014)
- Phoenix Stakes – (1) – Spartacus (2002)

(United Kingdom) Great Britain

- Coronation Stakes – (1) – Alpha Centauri (2018)
- Epsom Oaks – (1) – Qualify (2015)
- Falmouth Stakes – (1) – Alpha Centauri (2018)
- Yorkshire Oaks – (1) – Seventh Heaven (2016)

United States

- Secretariat Stakes – (1) – Treasure Beach (2011)
- Queen Elizabeth II Challenge Cup Stakes – (1) – Together (2011)

France

- Critérium International – (1) – Jan Vermeer (2009)
- Poule d'Essai des Poulains – (1) – Astronomer Royal (2007)
- Prix Jacques Le Marois – (1) – Alpha Centauri (2018)

Japan

- Copa Republica Argentina – (1) – Perform A Promise (2018)

India

- McDowell's Indian Derby – (1)–- Diabolical (2007)
- Indian 1,000 Guineas – (2) – Desert Lightning (2005) Sweeping Success (2007)
- Indian Oaks – (1) – Sweeping Success (2008)
- Indian 2,000 Guineas – (1) – Burbon King (2007)
- Royal Western Indian Turf Invitation Cup - (1) - Southern Empire (2007)
- Ever Ready Calcutta Derby – (1) – Moon Forrest (2007)
- Calcutta 2,000 Guineas – (1) – Star Team (2007)
- Calcutta Oaks – (1) – Classic Sky (2007)
- Bangalore 1,000 Guineas – (1) – Star Luminary (2006)
- Poonawalla Bangalore Derby – (3) – Star Luminary (2007)
- The Colts Championship Stakes (Gr.1) – (1) – Phoenix Tiger (2015)

UAE

- UAE Derby – (1) – Daddy Long Legs (2012)

Canada

- Canadian International – (1) – Joshua Tree (2012)
