= Blue Wind Stakes =

Flat horse race in Ireland

- Class: Group 3
- Location: Naas Racecourse; County Kildare, Ireland
- Inaugurated: 2001; 25 years ago
- Race type: Flat / Thoroughbred
- Sponsor: Al Shira'aa Racing
- Website: Naas

Race information
- Distance: 1m 2f 84y (2,284 metres)
- Surface: Turf
- Track: Left-handed
- Qualification: Three-years-old; Fillies
- Weight: 9 st 2 lb (3yo); Penalties; 5 lb for G1 / G2 winners * 3 lb for G3 winners * * since 1 June last year
- Purse: €65,000 (2024); 1st: €38,350

Blue Wind Stakes
2026
Rebel Moon	Caught U Sleeping	Cameo

Previous years
2025
Barnavara	Faiyum	And So To Bed
2024
Sea The Boss	Madam Celeste	Je Zous
2023
Caroline Street	Lumiere Rock	Red Riding Hood
2022
Tranquil Lady	Lily Pond	Tosen Lydia
2021
Insinuendo	Thunder Kiss	Willow

2020-2011
2020
One Voice	Snow	Yaxeni
2019
Tarnawa	Who's Steph	Delphinia
2018
Bye Bye Baby	Jaega	Clear Skies
2017
Turret Rocks	Laganore	Creggs Pipes
2016
Zhukova	Pretty Perfect	Bocca Baciata
2015
Pleascach	Zannda	Queen Of Alba
2014
Tarfasha	We'll Go Walking	Dazzling
2013
Euphrasia	La Collina	Princess Highway
2012
Princess Highway	Aaraas	Was
2011
Banimpire	Spin	Mid Mon Lady

2010-2003
2010
Akdarena	Indiana Gal	Grace O'malley
2009
Beauty O' Gwaun	Festival Princess	Chinese White
2008
Adored	Tiffany Diamond	Profound Beauty
2007
Four Sins	Cherry Hinton	Nick's Nikita
2006
Galatee	Allexina	Gift Range
2005
Right Key	Hazariya	Sweet Firebird
2004
Hazarista	Cache Creek	Felicity
2003
Humilis	Queen Astrid	Jakarta Jade

The Blue Wind Stakes is a Group 3 flat horse race in Ireland open to thoroughbred fillies and mares aged three years. It is run over a distance of 1 mile 2 furlongs and 84 yards (2,284 metres) at Naas in May.

== History ==
The event is named after Blue Wind, the Irish-trained winner of the Epsom Oaks and Irish Oaks in 1981. It was established in 2001, and was initially staged at Cork.

The race originally held Listed status, and was promoted to Group 3 level in 2004. It was transferred to Naas in 2005. Prior to 2020 it was also open to horses older than three years.

The Blue Wind Stakes can sometimes serve as a trial for the Epsom Oaks. The last participant to win the Oaks was Was, the third-placed horse in 2012.

== Records ==
Most successful horse:

- no horse has won this race more than once

Leading jockey (6 wins):

- Kevin Manning – Villa Carlotta (2002), Galatee (2006), Akdarena (2010), Banimpire (2011), Pleascach (2015), Turret Rocks (2017)

Leading trainer (6 wins):

- Jim Bolger – Villa Carlotta (2002), Galatee (2006), Akdarena (2010), Banimpire (2011), Pleascach (2015), Turret Rocks (2017)

== Winners ==
Year	Winner	Age	Jockey	Trainer	Time
2001	Adonesque	3	Niall McCullagh	John Oxx	2:04.70
2002	Villa Carlotta	4	Kevin Manning	Jim Bolger	2:14.70
2003	Humilis	3	Pat Smullen	Dermot Weld	2:20.10
2004	Hazarista	3	Fran Berry	John Oxx	2:09.80
2005	Right Key	3	Declan McDonogh	Kevin Prendergast	2:11.80
2006	Galatee	3	Kevin Manning	Jim Bolger	2:18.20
2007	Four Sins	3	Michael Kinane	John Oxx	2:11.60
2008	Adored	3	Johnny Murtagh	Aidan O'Brien	2:09.24
2009	Beauty O' Gwaun	3	Michael Kinane	John Oxx	2:14.97
2010	Akdarena	3	Kevin Manning	Jim Bolger	2:11.21
2011	Banimpire	3	Kevin Manning	Jim Bolger	2:13.18
2012	Princess Highway	3	Pat Smullen	Dermot Weld	2:17.64
2013	Euphrasia	4	Gary Carroll	Joseph G Murphy	2:21.19
2014	Tarfasha	3	Pat Smullen	Dermot Weld	2:14.34
2015	Pleascach	3	Kevin Manning	Jim Bolger	2:15.04
2016	Zhukova	4	Pat Smullen	Dermot Weld	2:16.62
2017	Turret Rocks (Note: The 2017 and 2018 races took place at The Curragh as part of fixture changes due to redevelopment work at The Curragh.)	4	Kevin Manning	Jim Bolger	2:08.58
2018	Bye Bye Baby	3	Seamie Heffernan	Aidan O'Brien	2:14.09
2019	Tarnawa	3	Chris Hayes	Dermot Weld	2:14.70
2020	One Voice (Note: The 2020 race took place at Leopardstown in June due to the COVID-19 pandemic in the Republic of Ireland)	3	Shane Foley	Jessica Harrington	2:08.99
2021	Insinuendo	4	Declan McDonogh	Willie McCreery	2:13.39
2022	Tranquil Lady	3	Dylan Browne McMonagle	Joseph O'Brien	2:14.75
2023	Caroline Street	3	Dylan Browne McMonagle	Joseph O'Brien	2:09.44
2024	Sea The Boss	3	Shane Foley	Jessica Harrington	2:14.70
2025	Barnavara	3	Shane Foley	Jessica Harrington	2:11.79
2026	Rebel Moon	3	Dylan Browne McMonagle	Joseph O'Brien	2:11.46

== See also ==
- Horse racing in Ireland
- List of Irish flat horse races
