= Shane Crosse =

Irish jockey

- Occupation: Flat racing jockey
- Born: 21 September 2001 (age 23)
- Nationality: Irish

Significant horses
- Pretty Gorgeous; Thundering Nights; State Of Rest

Shane Crosse (born 21 September 2001) is a retired Irish jockey who competed in flat racing.

== Background ==
Crosse comes from Cahir in County Tipperary in Ireland. His father Matt Crosse is a former jump jockey and brother Nathan Crosse is a flat-racing jockey. Crosse took part in pony racing and became an apprentice jockey at the yard of trainer Joseph O'Brien while he was still at school.

== Career ==
Crosse rode his first winner on 13 April 2018 when steering G Force to victory for trainer Adrian Keatley in a handicap at Naas. That season he was crowned Irish champion apprentice jockey. On 28 September 2019 he won his first Group race on the Joseph O'Brien-trained Speak in Colours in the Group 3 Renaissance Stakes at the Curragh.

The 2020 season brought Crosse his first Group 1 victory, when Pretty Gorgeous won the Fillies' Mile at Newmarket on 9 October. He had previously missed his intended ride on Galileo Chrome in the St Leger Stakes due to a positive COVID-19 test. Galileo Chrome went on to win the race under Tom Marquand.

In 2021 Crosse had another Group 1 success when riding Thundering Nights in the Pretty Polly Stakes at the Curragh.

On 1 May 2022 Crosse won the Group 1 Prix Ganay at Longchamp in Paris on State of Rest, who then provided Crosse with his first Royal Ascot victory when they won the Group 1 Prince of Wales's Stakes on 15 June.

On 1 July 2023 Crosse announced he was retiring from race riding due to weight issues.

== Major wins ==
France

- Prix Ganay - (1) - State Of Rest (2022)

(United Kingdom) Great Britain

- Fillies' Mile - (1) - Pretty Gorgeous (2020)
- Prince of Wales's Stakes - (1) - State Of Rest (2022)

(Republic of Ireland) Ireland

- Pretty Polly Stakes - (1) - Thundering Nights (2021)
