= David Wachman =

Racehorse trainer

David Wachman (born 5 July 1971) is a retired Irish racehorse trainer who specialised in flat racing.

Before taking out his own licence to train horses, Wachman worked for trainers in Ireland (Jessica Harrington, Michael Hourigan and Jim Bolger), Australia (Bill Mitchell and Brian Mayfield Smith) and England (Jenny Pitman). He began training near Carrick-on-Suir at the age of 25 with runners in point-to-point races and had his first winner in 1996 with Middle Mogs in a hurdle race at Clonmel, followed by his first flat race winner in June 1997 with Clewbay Pearl at Cork.

In 2002 Wachman married Kate Magnier, daughter of breeder John Magnier, and moved to a stables near Cashel. He began to concentrate on training for flat racing and subsequently won Group One races in Ireland, Great Britain and France as well as Grade I race in the United States and Canada. His best season was 2008, when he trained 40 winners in Ireland. In 2015 he scored his first victory in a British Classic when Legatissimo won the 1000 Guineas Stakes.

In August 2016 Wachman announced that he would retire from training at the end of the season. He saddled his final runner when Rekindling ran in the Critérium de Saint-Cloud in October 2016.

== Major wins ==
France

- Prix Morny - (1) - Bushranger (2008)

(United Kingdom) Great Britain

- 1000 Guineas Stakes - (1) - Legatissimo (2015)
- Middle Park Stakes - (1) - Bushranger (2008)
- Nassau Stakes - (1) - Legatissimo (2015)

(Republic of Ireland) Ireland

- Irish 1,000 Guineas - (1) - Again (2009)
- Matron Stakes - (1) - Legatissimo (2015)
- Moyglare Stud Stakes - (1) - Again (2008)
- Phoenix Stakes- (2) - Damson (2004), Sudirman (2013)
- Greenmount Park Novice Chase - (1) - Cane Break (2004)

United States

- Garden City Handicap - (1) - Luas Line (2005)

Canada

- E. P. Taylor Stakes - (1) - Curvy (2015)
