= Charming Thought =

British-bred Thoroughbred racehorse

- Sire: Oasis Dream
- Grandsire: Green Desert
- Dam: Annabelle's Charm
- Damsire: Indian Ridge
- Sex: Stallion
- Foaled: 24 January 2012
- Country: United Kingdom
- Colour: Bay
- Breeder: Merry Fox Stud Limited
- Owner: Godolphin
- Trainer: Charlie Appleby
- Record: 7: 3-1-0
- Earnings: £137,072

Major wins
- Middle Park Stakes (2014)

Charming Thought (foaled 24 January 2012) is a retired British Thoroughbred racehorse and breeding stallion. He showed his best form as a two-year-old in 2014. After finishing second on his debut he won two minor races and then recorded a 22/1 upset victory in the Middle Park Stakes. He then suffered from injury problems and did not run again until 2016 when he finished unplaced in three starts.

== Background ==
Charming Thought is a bay horse with a small white star bred in England by the Merry Fox Stud. As a yearling in October 2013 he was offered for sale at Tattersalls and bought for 625,000 guineas by John Ferguson Bloodstock, acting on behalf of Sheikh Mohammed's Godolphin organisation. The colt was sent into training with Charlie Appleby at Newmarket, Suffolk.

He was sired by Oasis Dream, a sprinter who won the July Cup and the Nunthorpe Stakes in 2003 before becoming a very successful breeding stallion. His other progeny have included Jwala, Goldream, Midday, Power and Muhaarar.

He was the first foal of Annabelle's Charm, who showed some ability as a racehorse, winning three of her fourteen races between 2008 and 2010 and was a granddaughter of Flamenco Wave, a lightly-raced but high-class performer who won the Moyglare Stud Stakes in 1988. Flamenco Wave was even better as a broodmare, producing several other winners including Aristotle, Starborough and Ballingarry. Her unraced daughter Leaping Water became the dam of St Nicholas Abbey. She was one of many good horses descended from the American broodmare Fleet Flight: others have included Almutawakel and White Muzzle.

== Racing career ==
=== 2014: two-year-old season ===
Charming Thought made his racecourse debut in a maiden race over six furlongs at Nottingham Racecourse on 15 August in which he started at odds of 2/1 and finished second, beaten half a length by the Mark Johnston-trained Flash Fire. On 3 September the colt started 4/11 favourite in a nine-runner field for a maiden over the same distance at Lingfield Park Racecourse. Ridden by William Buick he raced in third place before taking the lead a furlong from the finish and drew clear to win "readily" by two lengths from Kinematic. Nineteen days later Charming Thought was made the odds-on favourite against three opponents when he was ridden by Adam Kirby in a minor race over six furlongs at Leicester Racecourse. After being restrained by Kirby in the early running he took the lead inside the final furlong and won by half a length from Surewecan.

On 17 October Charming Thought was moved up sharply in class and started a 22/1 outsider for the Group One Middle Park Stakes over six furlongs at Newmarket Racecourse. The unbeaten Ivawood started the 1/2 favourite after wins in the July Stakes and the Richmond Stakes, whilst the other four runners were Cappella Sansevero (Round Tower Stakes). Muhaarar (Gimcrack Stakes), Kool Kompany (Railway Stakes, Prix Robert Papin) and the Aidan O'Brien-trained The Warrior. Muhaarar set the pace before giving way to Ivawood approaching the final furlong at which point Charming Thought, who had been restrained by William Buick in the early stages, was switched to the right to make his challenge. He moved up alongside Ivawood in the last hundred yards and prevailed by a nose in a closely contested finish with Muharaar a length and a quarter back in third place. The colts victory gave the Godolphin stable their first Group One win of the year in the United Kingdom. Charlie Appleby commented "It's great to get the first Group One in England out of the way. It was the last roll of the dice for us. This is a horse we've held in high regard from the spring onwards, we just met with a slight setback in the spring, so we had to be patient with him. We'll put him away now, that was always the plan, win lose or draw".

=== 2016: four-year-old season ===
A succession of injury problems, starting with a "chip in the knee" kept Charming Thought off the track in 2015.

The colt returned as a four-year-old in the Listed Cathedral Stakes at Salisbury Racecourse on 12 June 2016. Ridden by Buick, he made some progress in the closing stages without ever looking likely to win and finished fourth of the eleven runners behind Don't Touch. He showed little improvement in two subsequent starts that year, finishing sixth to The Tin Man in the Hackwood Stakes at Newbury Racecourse in July and ninth of ten behind the filly Nemoralia in the City of York Stakes at York Racecourse in August.

Charming Thought retired to Dalham Hall Stud.

== Pedigree ==
Pedigree of Charming Thought (GB), bay colt, 2012
Sire Oasis Dream (GB) 2000	Green Desert (USA); 1983	Danzig	Northern Dancer
Sire Oasis Dream (GB) 2000	Green Desert (USA); 1983	Danzig	Pas de Nom
Sire Oasis Dream (GB) 2000	Green Desert (USA); 1983	Foreign Courier	Sir Ivor
Sire Oasis Dream (GB) 2000	Green Desert (USA); 1983	Foreign Courier	Courtly Dee
Sire Oasis Dream (GB) 2000	Hope (IRE); 1991	Dancing Brave	Lyphard
Sire Oasis Dream (GB) 2000	Hope (IRE); 1991	Dancing Brave	Navajo Princess
Sire Oasis Dream (GB) 2000	Hope (IRE); 1991	Bahamian	Mill Reef
Sire Oasis Dream (GB) 2000	Hope (IRE); 1991	Bahamian	Sorbus
Dam Annabelle's Charm (IRE) 2005	Indian Ridge (IRE); 1985	Ahonoora	Lorenzaccio
Dam Annabelle's Charm (IRE) 2005	Indian Ridge (IRE); 1985	Ahonoora	Helen Nichols
Dam Annabelle's Charm (IRE) 2005	Indian Ridge (IRE); 1985	Hillbrow	Swing Easy
Dam Annabelle's Charm (IRE) 2005	Indian Ridge (IRE); 1985	Hillbrow	Golden City
Dam Annabelle's Charm (IRE) 2005	Kylemore (IRE); 1998	Sadler's Wells	Northern Dancer
Dam Annabelle's Charm (IRE) 2005	Kylemore (IRE); 1998	Sadler's Wells	Fairy Bridge
Dam Annabelle's Charm (IRE) 2005	Kylemore (IRE); 1998	Flamenco Wave	Desert Wine
Dam Annabelle's Charm (IRE) 2005	Kylemore (IRE); 1998	Flamenco Wave	Armada Way (Family: 16-g)

- Charming Thought is inbred 4 × 4 to Northern Dancer meaning that this stallion appears twice in the fourth generation of his pedigree.
