= Flamenco Wave =

American-bred Thoroughbred racehorse

- Sire: Desert Wine
- Grandsire: Damascus
- Dam: Armada Way
- Damsire: Sadair
- Sex: Mare
- Foaled: 1 March 1986
- Country: United States
- Colour: Chestnut
- Breeder: Dan J Agnew & Cardiff Stud Farms
- Owner: Sheikh Mohammed
- Trainer: John Oxx
- Record: 4: 2-0-0
- Earnings: £96,901

Major wins
- Moyglare Stud Stakes (1988)

Awards
- Timeform rating 103p (1988)

Flamenco Wave (1 March 1986 – 2003) was an American-bred, Irish-bred Thoroughbred racehorse and broodmare. As a two-year-old in 1988, she won a maiden race on her debut and then recorded her biggest victory when taking the Group 1 Moyglare Stud Stakes. She did not run again as a juvenile and finished last in both her races in 1989. After her retirement from racing, she became an outstanding broodmare, producing Starborough, Aristotle and Ballingarry, and being the female-line ancestor of St Nicholas Abbey and Charming Thought. She died in 2003 at the age of 17.

== Background ==
Flamenco Wave was a "well-made" chestnut mare with a white star bred in Kentucky by Dan J Agnew & Cardiff Stud Farms. As a yearling, the filly was consigned to the Fasig-Tipton sale at Saratoga Springs, New York, where she was sold for $140,000 to representatives of Sheikh Mohammed. She was sent to race in Europe, where she entered training with John Oxx in Ireland. The filly was ridden in all of her races by the Australian jockey Ron Quinton.

She was from the first crop of foal sired by the American stallion Desert Wine, who finished second in both the Kentucky Derby and the Preakness Stakes in 1983 before taking the Hollywood Gold Cup a year later. Flamenco Wave's dam, Armada Way, showed good racing ability, winning eight times in the United States. She was a great-granddaughter of Lea Lark, an American broodmare whose other descendants have included Tobougg, Miswaki, Almutawakel, Southern Halo Peter Davies, A Shin Hikari and White Muzzle.

== Racing career ==
=== 1988: two-year-old season ===
Flamenco Wave made her racecourse debut in a maiden race over six furlongs at the Curragh on 13 August. She started the 9/4 favourite against twelve opponents and won by a length from City Index. For her next race, the filly was stepped up sharply in class for the Group 1 Moyglare Stud Stakes over the same course and distance on 11 September. Despite her lack of experience, she was made the 11/2 third choice in the betting behind the Dermot Weld-trained Elegance in Design and the Flying Five winner Heather Seeker. The other eight runners included Run To Jenny (runner-up in the Phoenix Stakes) and Honoria (Railway Stakes). Flamenco Wave was not among the early leaders as Heather Seeker set the pace, but began to make progress in the last quarter mile. Despite hanging to the right in the closing stages, she gained the advantage in the final strides and won by a head and a neck from Honoria and Heather Seeker.

=== 1989: three-year-old season ===
Flamenco Wave began her second season in the Athasi Stakes over seven furlongs at the Curragh on 22 April. She started the 3/1 second favourite under top weight of 128 pounds but finished last of the ten runners behind the Tommy Stack-trained Pirouette. On 27 May racing on much firmer ground than she had previously encountered, she started a 25/1 outsider for the Irish 1000 Guineas. After leading in the early stages, she quickly dropped out of contention and came home last of the thirteen-runner field. Flamenco Wave never ran again, retiring with a record of two wins in four races.

== Breeding record ==
At the end of her racing career, Flamenco Wave was retired to become a broodmare for Sheikh Mohammed's stud. In December 1995, she was sent to the Tattersalls sale and was bought for 45,000 guineas by John Magnier of the Coolmore Stud. She produced nine foals and six winners between 1990 and 1999:

- Leaping Water, a chestnut filly, foaled in 1990, sired by Sure Blade. Unraced: dam of St Nicholas Abbey.
- Father Sky, bay colt (later gelded), 1991, by Dancing Brave. Won 15 races.
- Cante Chico, bay, 1992, by Reference Point. Won one race.
- Spanish Falls, chestnut filly, 1993, by Belmez. Won Prix de Royaumont.
- Starborough, chestnut colt, 1994, by Soviet Star. Won Prix Jean Prat and St James's Palace Stakes.
- Sanchez, chestnut filly, 1995, by Wolfhound. Failed to win in four races.
- Aristotle, bay colt, 1997, by Sadler's Wells. Won Racing Post Trophy.
- Kylemore, bay filly, 1998, by Sadler's Wells. Failed to win in two races. Dam of Annabelle's Charm (Dick Hern Fillies' Stakes) and grand-dam of Charming Thought.
- Ballingarry, bay colt, 1999, by Sadler's Wells. Won Critérium de Saint-Cloud and Canadian International Stakes.

== Pedigree ==
Pedigree of Flamenco Wave (USA), chestnut mare, 1986
Sire Desert Wine (USA) 1980	Damascus (USA); 1964	Sword Dancer	Sunglow
Sire Desert Wine (USA) 1980	Damascus (USA); 1964	Sword Dancer	Highland Fling
Sire Desert Wine (USA) 1980	Damascus (USA); 1964	Kerala	My Babu
Sire Desert Wine (USA) 1980	Damascus (USA); 1964	Kerala	Blade of Time
Sire Desert Wine (USA) 1980	Anne Campbell (USA); 1973	Never Bend	Nasrullah
Sire Desert Wine (USA) 1980	Anne Campbell (USA); 1973	Never Bend	Lalun
Sire Desert Wine (USA) 1980	Anne Campbell (USA); 1973	Repercussion	Tatan
Sire Desert Wine (USA) 1980	Anne Campbell (USA); 1973	Repercussion	Tomina
Dam Armada Way (USA) 1976	Sadair (USA); 1962	Petare	Moslem
Dam Armada Way (USA) 1976	Sadair (USA); 1962	Petare	Collette
Dam Armada Way (USA) 1976	Sadair (USA); 1962	Blue Missy	Blue Pair
Dam Armada Way (USA) 1976	Sadair (USA); 1962	Blue Missy	Miss Champion
Dam Armada Way (USA) 1976	Hurry Call (USA); 1960	Nasrullah	Nearco
Dam Armada Way (USA) 1976	Hurry Call (USA); 1960	Nasrullah	Mumtaz Begum
Dam Armada Way (USA) 1976	Hurry Call (USA); 1960	Fleet Flight	Count Fleet
Dam Armada Way (USA) 1976	Hurry Call (USA); 1960	Fleet Flight	Lea Lark (Family: 16-g)

- Flamenco Wave was inbred 3 × 4 to Nasrullah, meaning that this stallion appears in both the third and fourth generations of her pedigree.
