= Aristotle (horse) =

Irish-bred Thoroughbred racehorse

- Sire: Sadler's Wells
- Grandsire: Northern Dancer
- Dam: Flamenco Wave
- Damsire: Desert Wine
- Sex: Stallion
- Foaled: 18 February 1997
- Country: Ireland
- Colour: Bay
- Breeder: Orpendale
- Owner: Sue Magnier; Eres Tu, Glenlogan & Jacobsen
- Trainer: Aidan O'Brien; Malcolm Thwaites
- Record: 12: 4-1-2
- Earnings: £290,271

Major wins
- Racing Post Trophy (1999); Prix Greffulhe (2000, disqualified)

Aristotle (also known as Our Aristotle, foaled 18 February 1997) was an Irish-bred Thoroughbred racehorse and sire. He showed great promise as a two-year-old in 1999, winning a maiden race on his debut and then taking the Group One Racing Post Trophy. In an abbreviated second season he was disqualified after winning the Prix Greffulhe and ran poorly when strongly fancied for The Derby. He was then sold and exported to Singapore where he won twice and finished second in the Singapore Derby. He retired with a record of four wins from twelve starts in five different countries. He stood as a breeding stallion in Australia before moving to Ireland in 2009.

== Background ==
Aristotle was a bay horse with a large white star and four white socks bred in Ireland by Orpendale, a breeding company associated with John Magnier's Coolmore Stud. He was from the twelfth crop of foals sired by Sadler's Wells, who won the Irish 2,000 Guineas, Eclipse Stakes and Irish Champion Stakes in 1984 went on to be the Champion sire on fourteen occasions.

Aristotle's dam Flamenco Wave was a lightly-raced but high-class racehorse who won the Moyglare Stud Stakes in 1988. She was even better as a broodmare, producing several other winners including Starborough and Ballingarry. Her unraced daughter Leaping Water became the dam of St Nicholas Abbey. Flamenco Wave was one of many good horses descended from the American broodmare Fleet Flight: others have included Almutawakel and White Muzzle.

The colt initially raced in the colours of John Magnier's wife Susan and was sent into training with Aidan O'Brien at Ballydoyle.

== Racing career ==
=== 1999: two-year-old season ===
Aristotle began his racing career in a seven furlong maiden race at Galway Racecourse on 26 July 1999 and started at odds of 4/5 against seven opponents. Ridden by Mick Kinane he took the lead approaching the final furlong and stayed on in the closing stages to win by four and a half lengths from the Dermot Weld-trained Huangdi.

The colt was then moved up sharply in class when he was one of three O'Brien-trained colts to be sent to England contest the Group One Racing Post Trophy at Doncaster Racecourse on 23 October. Of the Ballydoyle trio Kinane rode the Dewhurst Stakes third Zentsov Street and P J Scallan partnered the Beresford Stakes winner Lermontov whilst the ride on Aristotle went to the experienced English jockey George Duffield. The 2/1 favourite was the Somerville Tattersall Stakes winner Scarteen Fox (later renamed Best Light) whilst the other five runners were Cornelius (third in the Coventry Stakes), Holding Court, Air Marshall, Ekraar (Vintage Stakes) and the 50/1 outsider Optimaite. Starting at odds of 10/1 after strong late support in the betting Aristotle tracked the leaders as Lermontov made the running but looked outpaced when Ekraar went to the front three furlongs out. He stayed on strongly however, gained the advantage inside the final furlong, and won by one and a quarter lengths and a neck from Lermontov and Ekraar. Duffield said of the winner "He has a great future. He's very laid-back but very brave. He wants to win. He went down to post like a bird". When asked about Aristotle as a Derby prospect O'Brien commented "I haven't seen one to beat him yet. He's tough, he's got class, and he stays" and added "You wouldn't believe how lazy this horse is. You only get what you ask from him but we always thought he was very good. All he does is eat and sleep. If you worked him with a donkey he would probably beat it a neck!".

=== 2000: three-year-old season ===
On his three-year-old debut, Aristotle was sent to France for the Group Two Prix Greffulhe over 2100 metres on heavy ground at Longchamp Racecourse on 23 April. Ridden by Kinane, he took the lead 800 metres from the finish and drew clear in the closing stages and won by three and a half lengths from Rhenium. However, he had veered left repeatedly in the straight, hampering the third-placed finisher Boutron, and after an inquiry by the racecourse stewards he was disqualified and demoted to third. Kinane commented "Aristotle ducked to the left on three occasions. It was something he's never done before. If he'd kept straight, we'd have won the race by 10 lengths".

On 10 June, Aristotle was one of fifteen colts to contest the 2000 Epsom Derby at and started the 5/1 third choice in the betting behind Beat Hollow and Sakhee. O'Brien had been in very confident mood in the build-up to the race describing the colt as "the best Derby horse we've had" and "perfectly made" for Epsom. In the event, Aristotle turned into the straight in fifth place but soon began to struggle and was eased down by Kinane in the closing stages to finish tenth behind Sinndar.

Aristotle was sold in August 2000 and sent to race in Singapore where he was trained by Malcolm Thwaites, a multiple champion in both Singapore and Malaysia.

=== 2001: four-year-old season ===
Aristotle took some time to settle in Singapore (where he was renamed Our Aristotle) and did not reappear until 2001. Racing at Kranji Racecourse he won the Singapore New Year 2000 over ten furlongs on 7 January, finished fifth in race three weeks later and then ran third to the German challengers Silvano and Caitano when favourite for the Singapore Cup on 3 March. He was then sent to the United Arab Emirates for the Dubai World Cup on dirt at Nad Al Sheba Racecourse on 24 March and finished tenth of eleven behind Captain Steve. On his return to Singapore he finished sixth in the second running of the Singapore Airlines International Cup in May and was then runner-up to Bocelli in the Singapore Derby in June. In August he recorded his second win in Singapore when he won the Three Rings Trophy. On his final racecourse appearance he finished unplaced in the Singapore Gold Cup at Kranji in November.

== Stud record ==
At the end of his racing career Aristotle was retired to become a breeding stallion. He stood for several years at the Lynden Stud, Victoria, Australia before returning to Ireland in 2009. He was expected to be auctioned that summer but was bought privately and resumed his stud career at the Steeple Stud in County Wexford.

== Pedigree ==
Pedigree of Aristotle (IRE), bay stallion, 1997
Sire Sadler's Wells (USA) 1981	Northern Dancer (CAN); 1961	Nearctic	Nearco
Sire Sadler's Wells (USA) 1981	Northern Dancer (CAN); 1961	Nearctic	Lady Angela
Sire Sadler's Wells (USA) 1981	Northern Dancer (CAN); 1961	Natalma	Native Dancer
Sire Sadler's Wells (USA) 1981	Northern Dancer (CAN); 1961	Natalma	Almahmoud
Sire Sadler's Wells (USA) 1981	Fairy Bridge (USA); 1975	Bold Reason	Hail To Reason
Sire Sadler's Wells (USA) 1981	Fairy Bridge (USA); 1975	Bold Reason	Lalun
Sire Sadler's Wells (USA) 1981	Fairy Bridge (USA); 1975	Special	Forli
Sire Sadler's Wells (USA) 1981	Fairy Bridge (USA); 1975	Special	Thong
Dam Flamenco Wave (USA) 1986	Desert Wine (USA); 1980	Damascus	Sword Dancer
Dam Flamenco Wave (USA) 1986	Desert Wine (USA); 1980	Damascus	Kerala
Dam Flamenco Wave (USA) 1986	Desert Wine (USA); 1980	Anne Campbell	Never Bend
Dam Flamenco Wave (USA) 1986	Desert Wine (USA); 1980	Anne Campbell	Repercussion
Dam Flamenco Wave (USA) 1986	Armada Way (USA); 1976	Sadair	Petare
Dam Flamenco Wave (USA) 1986	Armada Way (USA); 1976	Sadair	Blue Missy
Dam Flamenco Wave (USA) 1986	Armada Way (USA); 1976	Hurry Call	Nasrullah
Dam Flamenco Wave (USA) 1986	Armada Way (USA); 1976	Hurry Call	Fleet Flight (Family: 16-g)
