= Holding Court =

Holding Court may refer to:

- "Holding Court" (song), a song by Axium
- Holding Court (horse), a British Thoroughbred racehorse and sire
