= Starborough =

British-bred Thoroughbred racehorse

- Sire: Soviet Star
- Grandsire: Nureyev
- Dam: Flamenco Wave
- Damsire: Desert Wine
- Sex: Stallion
- Foaled: 15 May 1994
- Country: United Kingdom
- Colour: Chestnut
- Breeder: Sheikh Mohammed
- Owner: Sheikh Mohammed; Godolphin
- Trainer: David Loder; Saeed bin Suroor
- Record: 12: 4-1-1
- Earnings: £269,803

Major wins
- Prix Jean Prat (1997); St James's Palace Stakes (1997)

Starborough (15 May 1994 – 24 December 2006) was a British Thoroughbred racehorse and sire. He usually led from the start of his races and was best at distances of around one mile. Bred and owned by Sheikh Mohammed and trained in England by David Loder he showed promising form as a two-year-old in 1996, winning on his debut and finishing third and fourth against better opposition in his other two races.

In the following year, he finished fourth in the 2000 Guineas before recording Group One victories in the Prix Jean Prat and the St James's Palace Stakes, beating a particularly strong field in the latter race. Later that summer he finished second in the Sussex Stakes and fourth in the Prix Jacques Le Marois. He moved to the Godolphin stable in 1998 but his form deteriorated and he failed to win in three races.

After he retired from racing he stood as a breeding stallion in France and had some success as a sire of winners.

== Background ==
Starborough was a "well-made, medium-size" chestnut horse with a white blaze and a white sock on his right hind leg bred in England by his owner Sheikh Mohammed. He was sired by Soviet Star, an outstanding sprinter-miler whose wins included the Poule d'Essai des Poulains, Sussex Stakes, Prix de la Forêt, July Cup and Prix du Moulin. Soviet Star later became a very successful breeding stallion, siring major winners including Freedom Cry (Prix d'Harcourt), Starcraft, Ashkalani (Poule d'Essai des Poulains, Prix du Moulin), Soviet Line, Limpid (Grand Prix de Paris) and Pressing (Premio Roma).

Starborough's dam Flamenco Wave was a lightly-raced but high-class racehorse who won the Moyglare Stud Stakes in 1988. She was even better as a broodmare producing several other winners including Aristotle and Ballingarry. She was one of many good horses descended from the American broodmare Fleet Flight: others have included Almutawakel and White Muzzle.

The colt was initially sent into training with David Loder at Newmarket, Suffolk.

== Racing career ==
=== 1996: two-year-old season ===
On 23 August 1996, Starborough made his racecourse debut in a six furlong maiden race at Thirsk Racecourse, and started the 2/5 favourite against nine opponents. Ridden by Kevin Darley, he led from the start and won easily by three lengths from Indian Blaze. Two weeks later he was moved up in class and started favourite for the Listed Sirenia Stakes at Kempton, but finished third to the filly Arethusa. On his final appearance of the year he contested the Group Three Horris Hill Stakes at Newbury in October and finished fourth, just over a length behind the winner Desert Story.

=== 1997: three-year-old season ===
On his first appearance as a three-year-old, Starborough started 4/5 favourite for the Thirsk Classic Trial over one mile on 19 April. Darley sent him into the lead from the start and he stayed on strongly to win by two lengths from Intikhab with the only other runner Caviar Royale four lengths back in third. Two weeks later, the colt started a 33/1 outsider for the Classic 2000 Guineas over the Rowley Mile at Newmarket Racecourse. He led the sixteen-runner field until be overtaken approaching the last quarter mile and held on to finish fourth behind Entrepreneur, Revoque and Poteen.

Starborough was sent to France for his next race, the Group One Prix Jean Prat over 1800 metres at Chantilly Racecourse on 1 June. He started the 2/1 second favourite behind the André Fabre-trained Kirkwall, the winner of the Prix de Guiche, with the other three runners being Visionary (Prix Matchem, third in the Poule d'Essai des Poulains) Cirino and Mamalik. Ridden for the first time by Frankie Dettori, he led from the start and was driven out to win by one and a half lengths from Mamalik with Kirkwall a short head away in third.

Two weeks later the colt was brought back in distance for the 152nd running of the St James's Palace Stakes over one mile at Royal Ascot, and was again partnered by Dettori. Desert King started favourite ahead of Daylami and Poteen, with Starborough next in the betting on 11/2. The other runners included Mamalik, Air Express (Premio Parioli, Mehl-Mülhens-Rennen), In Command (Dewhurst Stakes) and Running Stag (runner-up in the Predominate Stakes). Starborough took the lead from the start as usual and set a strong pace from Mamalik and Running Stag. He maintained his advantage into the straight and held off a challenge from Air Express to win by a length, with Daylami four lengths back in third ahead of Desert King.

After the race Dettori said "He has got a very high cruising speed and there were some horses out there with a greater turn of foot so I wanted to take the sting out of them", whilst Loder commented "we decided to just let him roll and, as you can see, when he gets going he's got a pretty ferocious roll".

On 30 July, Starborough was matched against older horses for the first time when he was ridden by Pat Eddery (Dettori was suspended) in the Sussex Stakes at Goodwood Racecourse and started the 9/4 favourite. He led until the last quarter mile but was overtaken in the closing stages and beaten three-quarters of a lengths by the four-year-old Ali-Royal. The other beaten horses included Allied Forces (Queen Anne Stakes), Among Men, Air Express and Alhaarth.

In August, he was sent to France again and started favourite for the Prix Jacques Le Marois at Deauville Racecourse. After leading for most of the way he faded in the closing stages and finished fourth behind Spinning World, Daylami and Neuilly.

=== 1998: four-year-old season ===
In the winter of 1997/8, Starborough was transferred to the ownership of Sheikh Mohammed's Godolphin Racing organisation and removed from Loder's stable to be trained by Saeed bin Suroor. On his first appearance of 1998 he was sent to Hong Kong for the Queen Elizabeth II Cup over ten furlongs at Sha Tin Racecourse on 19 April and finished sixth, two lengths behind the locally trained winner Oriental Express.

On his return to Europe, the colt made a second attempt to win the Sussex Stakes. Ridden by Dettori he led until the last three furlongs before finishing fourth of the ten runners behind Among Men. Godolphin's spokesman Simon Crisford commented "He certainly hasn't been showing the form we know he is capable of producing, and fourth place... was as good as we could expect". Starborough was then dropped in class to contest the Celebration Mile over the same course and distance a month later but after leading in the early stages he finished seventh behind the John Gosden-trained Muhtathir.

== Stud record ==
Starborough was retired from racing and stood as a breeding stallion at the Haras de la Reboursiere et de Montaigu in France at an initial fee of ₣35,000. He died on 24 December 2006 at the age of twelve, after suffering complications from leg surgery.

The best of his offspring was probably the Hungarian-trained sprinter Overdose. Other good winners were Whortleberry (Premio Lydia Tesio, Prix Jean Romanet), Appel au Maitre (Stockholm Cup International) and Star Valley (Prix de Meautry).

== Pedigree ==
Pedigree of Starborough (GB), chestnut stallion, 1994
Sire Soviet Star (USA) 1984	Nureyev (USA); 1977	Northern Dancer	Nearctic
Sire Soviet Star (USA) 1984	Nureyev (USA); 1977	Northern Dancer	Natalma
Sire Soviet Star (USA) 1984	Nureyev (USA); 1977	Special	Forli
Sire Soviet Star (USA) 1984	Nureyev (USA); 1977	Special	Thong
Sire Soviet Star (USA) 1984	Veruschka (FR); 1967	Venture	Relic
Sire Soviet Star (USA) 1984	Veruschka (FR); 1967	Venture	Rose o'Lynn
Sire Soviet Star (USA) 1984	Veruschka (FR); 1967	Marie d'Anjou	Vandale
Sire Soviet Star (USA) 1984	Veruschka (FR); 1967	Marie d'Anjou	Marigold
Dam Flamenco Wave (USA) 1986	Desert Wine (USA); 1980	Damascus	Sword Dancer
Dam Flamenco Wave (USA) 1986	Desert Wine (USA); 1980	Damascus	Kerala
Dam Flamenco Wave (USA) 1986	Desert Wine (USA); 1980	Anne Cambell	Never Bend
Dam Flamenco Wave (USA) 1986	Desert Wine (USA); 1980	Anne Cambell	Repercussion
Dam Flamenco Wave (USA) 1986	Armada Way (USA); 1976	Sadair	Petare
Dam Flamenco Wave (USA) 1986	Armada Way (USA); 1976	Sadair	Blue Missy
Dam Flamenco Wave (USA) 1986	Armada Way (USA); 1976	Hurry Call	Nasrullah
Dam Flamenco Wave (USA) 1986	Armada Way (USA); 1976	Hurry Call	Fleet Flight (Family: 16-g)
