= Bradawn Breever =

Irish Thoroughbred racehorse

- Sire: Salmon Leap
- Grandsire: Northern Dancer
- Dam: Ozone
- Damsire: Auction Ring
- Sex: Stallion
- Foaled: 25 February 1989
- Country: Ireland
- Colour: Bay
- Breeder: M Morrin
- Owner: M A Murray
- Trainer: Kevin Prendergast
- Record: 38: 5-4-5
- Earnings: £147,953

Major wins
- Phoenix Stakes (1991); Rockingham Handicap (1993); Testimonial Stakes (1993)

Bradawn Breever (25 February 1989 – after 1994) was an Irish Thoroughbred racehorse. He showed his best form as a two-year-old in 1991 when he ran eleven times and won the Group 1 Phoenix Stakes on his eighth start. He remained in training for a further three seasons, winning further races including the Testimonial Stakes in 1993 before retiring with a record of five wins from thirty-eight starts. Apart from his victories he was placed in the Ballyogan Stakes, Flying Five Stakes, Chesham Stakes and Concorde Stakes. He did not stand as a breeding stallion.

== Background ==
Bradawn Breever was a bay horse bred in Ireland by M Morrin. During his racing career he was owned by M A Murray and trained by Kevin Prendergast.

He was sired by Salmon Leap, a top-class middle-distance performer who won the Nijinsky Stakes, ran fourth in The Derby and was the best-placed male horse when coming home fifth in the 1983 Prix de l'Arc de Triomphe. Despite a Timeform rating of 131, he made very little impact as a breeding stallion. Bradawn Breever's dam Ozone was a descendant of the British broodmare Wife of Bath, making her a distant relative of Silly Season, Mon Fils and Saoire.

== Racing career ==
=== 1991: two-year-old season ===
Bradawn Breever began his racing career by finishing fourth in a maiden race over five furlongs at Leopardstown Racecourse on 18 March. He then ran second in a similar event at the Curragh two weeks later and third in a maiden over six furlongs at Leopardstown on 8 May. Ten days later the colt started at odds of 4/1 for a maiden at the Curragh and recorded his first success as he won by a neck from the John Oxx-trained filly Tarwiya. In this race he was ridden for the first time by Rodney Griffiths, who partnered him for the rest of the season. He was also equipped for the first time with blinkers, which he wore in most of his subsequent races.

In June Bradawn Breever finished second to Safety Tactic in a minor race at Naas Racecourse and was then sent to England to contest the Chesham Stakes at Royal Ascot. Starting a 20/1 outsider he led for most of the way before being outpaced in the final furlong and finishing third behind Fair Cop and Governor's Imp. In the Curragh Stakes in July he led the field until half way but then finished fourth behind the Jim Bolger-trained Leading Time. The Group 1 Phoenix Stakes at Leopardstown on 11 August saw Bradawn Breever start a 14/1 outsider in a nine-runner field. The British challenger Changing Times (winner of the Black Duck Stakes) started favourite, while the other fancied runners included Safety Tactic, Storm Melody (fourth in the Norfolk Stakes, Maledetto (Marble Hill Stakes) and the previously unraced Festive Cheer. Griffiths sent Bradawn Breever into the lead from the start and the colt maintained his advantage throughout. Despite tiring in the final furlong he just held on to win in a four horse "blanket finish" beating Maledetto by a head, with Festive Cheer and Safety Tactic a head and short head away in third and fourth.

In the Flying Five Stakes at Leopardstown on 14 September Bradawn Breever was matched against older sprinters and finished third to the three-year-old filly Flowing after leading until the final furlong. In October he was sent to France to contest the Prix de l'Abbaye at Longchamp Racecourse and came home ninth of the fourteen runners, four lengths behind the four-year-old winner Keen Hunter. On his final appearance of the season he finished unplaced in the valuable Racecall Gold Trophy at Redcar Racecourse on 29 October.

=== 1992: three-year-old season ===
As a three-year-old Bradawn Breever was campaigned in sprint races but had little success. He finished unplaced in the Ballyogan Stakes and the Concorde Stakes before coming home third to Flowing in a Listed event at Tipperary Racecourse in July. He failed to make the frame in four subsequent efforts, finishing unplaced in the Prix Maurice de Gheest, Phoenix Sprint Stakes, Belgrave Stakes and Flying Five.

=== 1993: four-year-old season ===
In the early part of 1993 Bradawn Breever finished second in the Listed Topaz Stakes and the Ballyogan Stakes but then finished unplaced on his next six starts. On 21 August the horse was assigned top weight of 136 pounds for the Rockingham Handicap over five furlongs at the Curragh and recorded his first win in over two years as he prevailed by half a length from Diamonds Galore with the favourite Lavinia Fontana in fourth. After finishing sixth in the Flying Five on 11 September he won a handicap at the Curragh a week later, beating fifteen opponents under 136 pounds. On 2 October Bradawn Breever started 3/1 favourite for the Listed Testimonial Stakes over six furlongs at the Curragh in which he was ridden, as in all but one of his races that year, by Willie Supple. After tracking the leaders he took the lead inside the final furlong and prevailed by a head from Lavinia Fontana.

=== 1993: five-year-old season ===
Bradawn Breever failed to finish any better than fifth in his first five starts on 1993. In the Concorde Stakes at Tipperary on 21 July he started a 16/1 outsider and came home third behind Heart Lake and Unusual Heat. On his final racecourse appearance he finished seventh in a handicap at Leopardstown on 1 August.

== Pedigree ==
Pedigree of Bradawn Breever (IRE), bay horse, 1989
Sire Salmon Leap (USA) 1980	Northern Dancer (CAN); 1961	Nearctic	Nearco
Sire Salmon Leap (USA) 1980	Northern Dancer (CAN); 1961	Nearctic	Lady Angela
Sire Salmon Leap (USA) 1980	Northern Dancer (CAN); 1961	Natalma	Native Dancer
Sire Salmon Leap (USA) 1980	Northern Dancer (CAN); 1961	Natalma	Almahmoud
Sire Salmon Leap (USA) 1980	Fish Bar (IRE); 1967	Baldric	Round Table
Sire Salmon Leap (USA) 1980	Fish Bar (IRE); 1967	Baldric	Two Cities
Sire Salmon Leap (USA) 1980	Fish Bar (IRE); 1967	Fisherman's Wharf	Alycidon
Sire Salmon Leap (USA) 1980	Fish Bar (IRE); 1967	Fisherman's Wharf	Herringbone
Dam Ozone (GB) 1977	Auction Ring (USA); 1972	Bold Bidder	Bold Ruler
Dam Ozone (GB) 1977	Auction Ring (USA); 1972	Bold Bidder	High Bid
Dam Ozone (GB) 1977	Auction Ring (USA); 1972	Hooplah	Hillary
Dam Ozone (GB) 1977	Auction Ring (USA); 1972	Hooplah	Beadah
Dam Ozone (GB) 1977	Musical Watch (GB); 1964	Tudor Melody	Tudor Minstrel
Dam Ozone (GB) 1977	Musical Watch (GB); 1964	Tudor Melody	Matelda
Dam Ozone (GB) 1977	Musical Watch (GB); 1964	Tikva	Fair Trial
Dam Ozone (GB) 1977	Musical Watch (GB); 1964	Tikva	Little Britain (Family: 1-g)
