= Overdose (horse) =

British-bred Thoroughbred racehorse

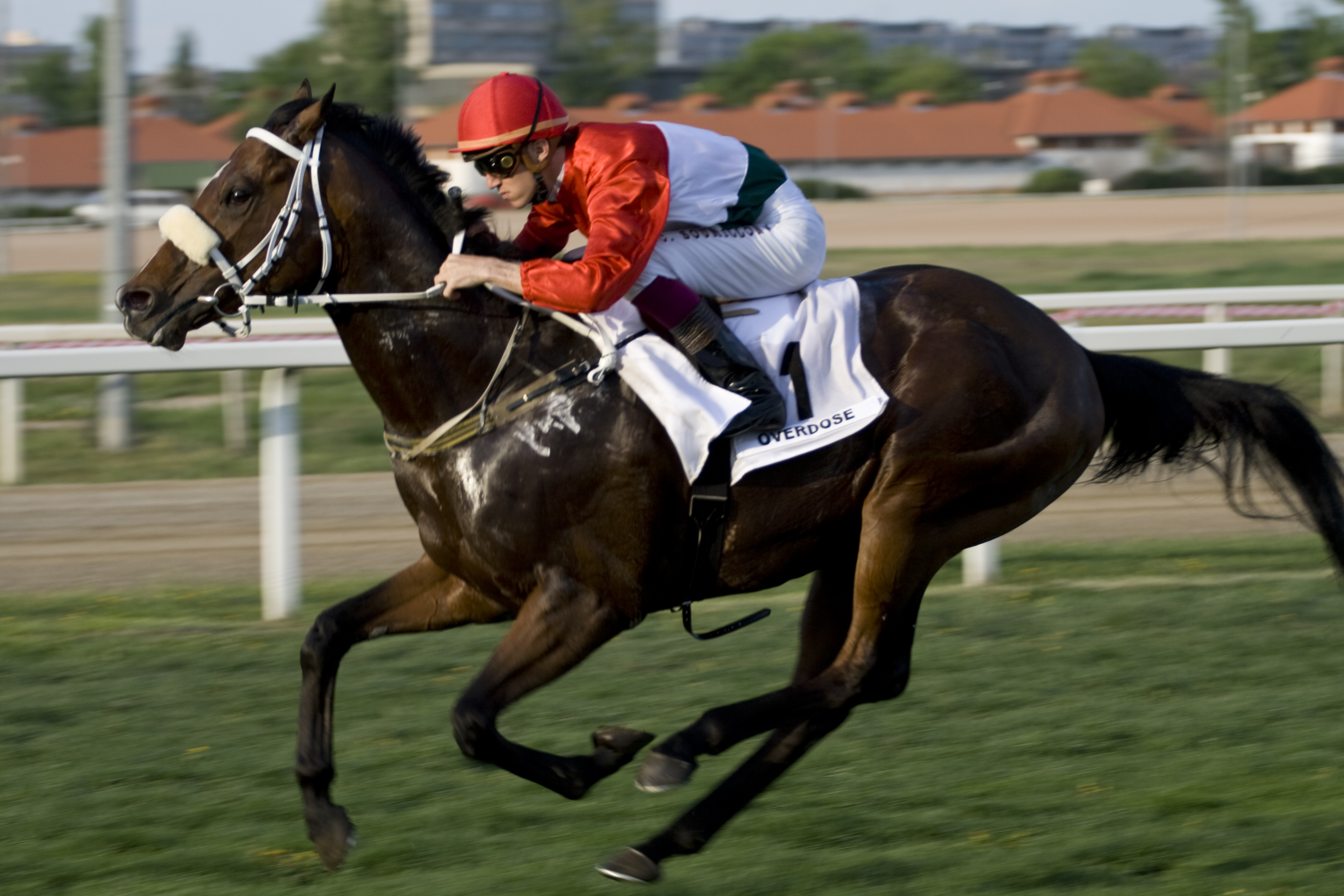
- Overdose, with Christophe Soumillon up, winning the OTP-Hungária Cup
- Sire: Starborough
- Grandsire: Soviet Star (USA)
- Dam: Our Poppet (IRE)
- Damsire: Warning
- Sex: Stallion
- Foaled: 2005
- Country: Great Britain
- Colour: Bay
- Breeder: G. and Mrs Robinson
- Owner: Zoltán Mikóczy; MIKO Racing and Trading Ltd
- Trainer: József Roszival; Sándor Ribárszki
- Record: 19 starts: 16-0-1
- Earnings: £151,311
- Last updated on 30 August 2010

Overdose (2 April 2005 in Nottinghamshire, Great Britain – 1 July 2015 in Germany) was a Hungarian Thoroughbred racehorse. During his career he was victorious in sixteen of his nineteen races.

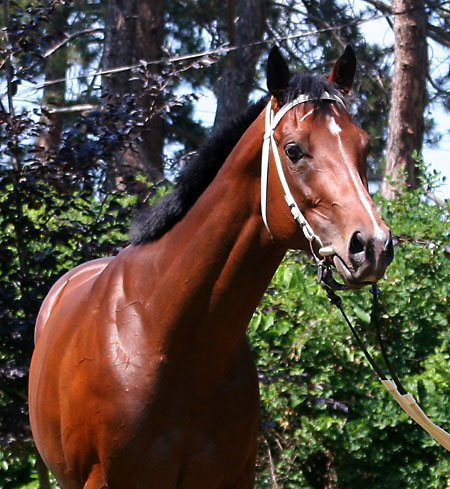
Overdose in Budapest 2008 Foto:Judit Seipert

== Breeding ==
Overdose was English-bred and was sold at Tattersalls December Yearling Sales in November 2006 for just 2,000 guineas (£2,100). His sire was a miler called Starborough and he was out of Our Poppet (IRE) by Warning. He was a half-brother of three winners.

His owner, Zoltán Mikóczy purchased Overdose only by chance and has been quoted as saying "I just put my hand up for fun, I like excitement of the horse auctions. I thought no horse can go this cheap and surely somebody else would bid. He's short and I'd say kind of ugly, so of course nobody wanted him."

== Racing career ==
Overdose had an unbeaten series of 14 races. In these races he won with a total of 116,5 lengths, which means 8,3 lengths per race in average.

He ran a new track record at his home track (Kincsem Park, Budapest, Hungary), for his first ever race (in which he was victorious with 18 lengths).

In 2008 he was named Wunderpferd (wonderhorse) in Germany, for winning German sprint races – including the Group 2 Goldene Peitsche – in such a dominant style.

He won a Group I race at Longchamp, but the race was declared void due to a non-opening gate. His time was only 0,1 second behind the track record of Habibti. He did not participate in the re-run at the end of the day, since his unbeaten record was at risk. Quote: "At this moment, I don't care about the money, the rewards, or the hype around him. The only important thing is that the horse stays healthy. Basically, Overdose has proven that he is much better than these horses and nobody could have beaten him today, Zoltán Mikóczy said.

According to the owner of the SCH Racing racing stable, the officials of the organizer France Galop are well aware that they made a huge mistake, but they do not want to officially admit it. The Hungarian team would like to receive the official position from the organizers even before the supplementary competition is ordered, but they refuse to do so "citing various excuses".

In the interpretation of the Hungarian team, the judge simply did not stop the race, but kept the flag, which meant to the jockey that everything was fine. "This is a huge embarrassment for the organizers, which they don't want to acknowledge and are now trying to smooth over the whole thing," added Mikóczy.

According to the owner of Overdose, one of the reasons for this could be that the "savior of the French" got off to a bad start and "stayed in the race", while the Hungarian horse gave his all. If the competition were to restart now, it would simply not be legal, because "there would not be equal opportunities," said Mikóczy.

Before the race, the bookies had Overdose as the second most likely to win. In a competition of this rank, but at a different distance, the unbeatable Kincsem was the last to start in Hungarian colors.

Only a month later Overdose won a Group III race in Rome, with a dominating 10 lengths.

In the 2008 world thoroughbred rankings for Three-year-old sprinters (all continents, Derby years) Overdose was ranked as THE FASTEST 3YO SPRINTER IN THE WORLD by Timeform and IFHA. Among the top sprinters (all continents and years) he was ranked 4th at Timeform with a rating of 126 and 6th at IFHA with 120, despite he did not win a Group I race (at least not officially). He was also ranked second best European sprinter by Timeform and the IFHA (all years).

In 2009 Christophe Soumillon volunteered to ride the horse. After his year opening race at Kincsem Park, Budapest, Overdose was called the Budapest Bullet in Britain, and appeared on the cover of the New York Times, which named him the "Hungarian Seabiscuit".

In mid-2009 one of his hooves became inflamed, which resulted in laminitis. This put the horse's whole career in danger. His recovery lasted for 15 months. Overdose returned in July 2010, with two victories in Bratislava and Budapest, growing his unbeaten record to 14 races.

Overdose lost his unbeaten record in his 15th race under disputed circumstances. In Germany, Baden-Baden, the starter waited eight minutes to get him into the startbox. During this time his rider Christophe Soumillon fell from his saddle thrice. This "procedure" resulted in a hopeless race for him. Although he led to 1000 meters, Overdose lost too much power when entering the startbox, therefore he was unable to keep the pace in the last furlong, and finished only seventh. Professionals says that the German starter was under great pressure, since Overdose's comeback was in the centre of the communication of the racetrack's actual festival (the Große Woche), and the stands were full, since everybody was keen to see Overdose. After this race the horse has suffered another, but minor injury, which resulted in the miss of the remaining of the season.

In 2011 he started the season in Berlin, Germany, with a dominating victory, and ran a new track record. This was the season-opening raceday of the track, and there was a full house. After this great result Overdose was the favourite of all British bookmakers for both of his forthcoming races in the United Kingdom; the Temple Stakes and the King's Stand Stakes.

On the day of his long waited first race in Britain, Overdose appeared on the cover of four newspapers. Second time on Racing Post's cover that week (the first occasion has been his arrival to Britain). He was in the centre of the television broadcast as well. Unfortunately Overdose's travel took three days from Hungary to Britain, and the five days he spent in Britain before the race was not enough to regenerate. Maybe this was the reason why Overdose only placed seventh by four lengths behind the winner in the Group II Temple Stakes. But the team knew, there is more in him, therefore they have stayed in Britain, to prepare him for the Royal Ascot. After the Haydock race Overdose was able to regenerate during the remaining three weeks to his Royal Ascot race. He was not a favourite anymore. He started in the Group I King's Stand Stakes on the lead, and ran head to head with the Hong Kong superstar Sweet Sanette in the forthcoming furlongs. In the end Overdose finished fourth, only a length away from the winner, and a neck away from Sweet Sanette. The remaining horses were more than two lengths away from the winning four. After the race the officials of the Ascot Racecourse said that they had never seen a horse performing in such a high level after suffering laminitis.

Another minor injury resulted in the horse's missing of almost all races of the autumn season, and Overdose was able to race again in November only; the second time in Rome, and for the first time with Frankie Dettori. This time Overdose won with only a half length, but he was spared, Dettori did not ask for more from him.

In February 2012, Overdose suffered a serious injury at Meydan Racecourse, in the very beginning of the 2012 Dubai Racing Carnival which the plan was for Overdose to enter.

=== Jockeys ===
- 2007. Martin Srnec, Zdenko Smida, Piotr Krowicki
- 2008. Piotr Krowicki, Andreas Suborics
- 2009. Christophe Soumillon
- 2010. Gary Hind, Christophe Soumillon
- 2011. Andreas Suborics, Frankie Dettori

== Race record ==
Result	Date	Race	Venue	Group	Distance	Weight	Jockey	Time	Winner/2nd	Margin
Won	2 June 2007	2yo – cat. IV.	(Hungary) Kincsem Park, Budapest	NA	1000 m	58.0 kg	Martin Srnec	0:58.0	2nd: Femme Fatale	18
Won	22 July 2007	Cena Muscatita – cat. I.	(Slovakia) Závodisko, Bratislava	NA	1200 m	58.0 kg	Martin Srnec	1:12.02	2nd: Addison	6
Won	9 September 2007	Graf N. Esterhazy Mem.	(Austria) Freudenau, Vienna	LR	1200 m	61.0 kg	Piotr Krowicki	1:11.4	2nd: Ceodora	13
Won	30 September 2007	Szent László Díj	(Hungary) Kincsem Park, Budapest	Gr2	1400 m	57.0 kg	Martin Srnec	1:23.6	2nd: Over Play	16
Won	21 October 2007	CE Challenge Cup Fut.	(Austria) Magna Racino, Ebreichsdorf	Gr1	1300 m	57.0 kg	Zdenko Smida	1:18.2	2nd: Over Play	8
Won	6 April 2008	Preis vom Marchfeld – cat. I.	(Austria) Magna Racino, Ebreichsdorf	NA	1100 m	55.0 kg	Piotr Krowicki	1:04.6	2nd: Special Key	6
Won	18 May 2008	Lanson Cup	(Germany) Baden-Baden, Iffezheim	LR	1200 m	58.0 kg	Piotr Krowicki	1:08.92	2nd: Laokoon	9
Won	1 June 2008	Cena Min. Pod. Slov. Rep.	(Slovakia) Závodisko, Bratislava	Gr3	1200 m	57.0 kg	Piotr Krowicki	1:10.09	2nd: Városbíró	8
Won	5 July 2008	Hamburg Trophy	(Germany) Hamburg-Horn	G3	1200 m	54.5 kg	Andreas Suborics	1:12.19	2nd: Abbadjinn	1.5
Won	31 August 2008	138. Goldene Peische	(Germany) Baden-Baden, Iffezheim	G2	1200 m	56.0 kg	Andreas Suborics	1:08.21	2nd: Abbadjinn	2.5
-	5 October 2008	Prix de l'Abbaye – VOID RACE	(France) Longchamp, Paris	G1	1000 m	62.0 kg	Andreas Suborics	0:54.4	2nd: Strike Up The Band	4.25
Won	16 November 2008	Premio C. e F. Aloisi	(Italy) Capannelle, Rome	G3	1200 m	64.5 kg	Andreas Suborics	1:10.0	2nd: Black Mambazo	10
Won	19 April 2009	OTP-Hungária Nagydíj	(Hungary) Kincsem Park, Budapest	Gr1	1000 m	62.0 kg	Christophe Soumillon	0:54.6	2nd: Spinning Crystal	8
Won	18 July 2010	Cena Mysa	(Slovakia) Závodisko, Bratislava	LR	1000 m	59.0 kg	Gary Hind	1:00.77	2nd: Boschka	0.5
Won	15 August 2010	Pannónia Életbiztosító Díj	(Hungary) Kincsem Park, Budapest	LR	1000 m	59.0 kg	Gary Hind	0:56.4	2nd: Spinning Crystal	10
7th	29 August 2010	140. Goldene Peitsche	(Germany) Baden-Baden, Iffezheim	G2	1200 m	59.0 kg	Christophe Soumillon	1:11.38	Winner: Amico Fritz	-5.25
Won	17 April 2011	Hoppegartener Fliegerpreis	(Germany) Hoppegarten, Berlin	NA	1000 m	59.0 kg	Andreas Suborics	0:57.1	2nd: Shot To Nothing	6
7th	21 May 2011	Temple Stakes	(United Kingdom) Haydock Park	G2	1000 m	59.0 kg	Andreas Suborics	0:57.67	Winner: Sole Power	-4
4th	14 June 2011	King's Stand Stakes	(United Kingdom) Ascot Racecourse	G1	1000 m	59.0 kg	Andreas Suborics	0:59.50	Winner: Prohibit	-1.25
Won	13 November 2011	Premio C. e F. Aloisi	(Italy) Capannelle, Rome	G3	1200 m	61.0 kg	Frankie Dettori	1:08.40	2nd: Dagda Mor	0.5

Overdose suffered a serious injury at Meydan Racecourse, just before the beginning of the 2012 Dubai Racing Carnival. After that he was retired from racing and was available at Bábolna-Dióspuszta Stud in Hungary in 2014 first, then in 2015 at Vollblutgestüt Lindenhof in Germany.

(Note, that G1, G2 and G3 means internationally recognized Group 1, Group 2 and Group 3 races, while Gr1, Gr2 and Gr3 means Grade 1, Grade 2 and Grade 3 races, recognized in Hungary, Slovakia and Austria.)

== Pedigree ==
Pedigree of Overdose (GB), B. h. 2005
Sire Starborough (GB) Ch. 1994	Soviet Star (USA); Bay 1984	Nureyev	Northern Dancer
Sire Starborough (GB) Ch. 1994	Soviet Star (USA); Bay 1984	Nureyev	Special
Sire Starborough (GB) Ch. 1994	Soviet Star (USA); Bay 1984	Veruschka	Venchi
Sire Starborough (GB) Ch. 1994	Soviet Star (USA); Bay 1984	Veruschka	Marie d'Anjou
Sire Starborough (GB) Ch. 1994	Flamenco Wave (USA); Ch. 1986	Desert Wine	Damascus
Sire Starborough (GB) Ch. 1994	Flamenco Wave (USA); Ch. 1986	Desert Wine	Anne Campbell
Sire Starborough (GB) Ch. 1994	Flamenco Wave (USA); Ch. 1986	Armada Way	Sadair
Sire Starborough (GB) Ch. 1994	Flamenco Wave (USA); Ch. 1986	Armada Way	Hurry Call
Dam Our Poppet (IRE) Bay 1997	Warning; Br. 1985	Known Fact	In Reality
Dam Our Poppet (IRE) Bay 1997	Warning; Br. 1985	Known Fact	Tamerett
Dam Our Poppet (IRE) Bay 1997	Warning; Br. 1985	Slightly Dangerous	Roberto
Dam Our Poppet (IRE) Bay 1997	Warning; Br. 1985	Slightly Dangerous	Where You Read
Dam Our Poppet (IRE) Bay 1997	Upend; Bay 1985	Main Reef	Mill Reef
Dam Our Poppet (IRE) Bay 1997	Upend; Bay 1985	Main Reef	Lovely Light
Dam Our Poppet (IRE) Bay 1997	Upend; Bay 1985	Gay Charlotte	Charlottown
Dam Our Poppet (IRE) Bay 1997	Upend; Bay 1985	Gay Charlotte	Merry Mate (Family No. 7-a)

== See also ==
- List of leading Thoroughbred racehorses
- List of racehorses
