= Premio Chiusura =

- Location: San Siro Racecourse; Milan, Italy
- Race type: Flat / Thoroughbred
- Website: San Siro

Race information
- Distance: 1,400 metres (7f)
- Surface: Turf
- Track: Straight
- Qualification: Two-years-old and up
- Weight: 50 kg (2yo); 59 kg (3yo+); Allowances; 1½ kg for fillies and mares Penalties; 4½ kg for Group 1 winners * 3 kg for Group 2 winners * 2 kg for Group 3 winners * 2 kg if three Listed wins * 1 kg if two Listed wins * * since January 1
- Purse: €70,400 (2016); 1st: €23,800

The Premio Chiusura is a flat horse race in Italy open to thoroughbreds aged two years or older. It is run at Milan over a distance of 1,400 metres (about 7 furlongs), and it is scheduled to take place each year in late October or early November.

The event is traditionally held during Milan's last flat racing fixture of the year. The English translation of its title is Closing Prize.

The Premio Chiusura was given Group 2 status in the 1970s. It was relegated to Group 3 level in 1988 and downgraded to Listed status in 2017. Downgraded to conditioning staus in 2022.

== Records ==
Most successful horse since 1971 (3 wins):

- Salselon – 2001, 2002, 2003

Leading jockey since 1986 (3 wins):

- Giovanni Forte – Lavinia Fontana (1994, 1995), Salselon (2001)

Leading trainer since 1986 (4 wins):

- John Dunlop – Efisio (1987), Alquoz (1989), Lavinia Fontana (1994, 1995)

== Winners since 1986 ==
Year	Winner	Age	Jockey	Trainer	Time
1986	Assisi del Santo	3	Antonio di Nardo	Gaetano Benetti
1987	Efisio	5	John Reid	John Dunlop
1988	Aim for the Top	3	Walter Swinburn	Michael Stoute	1:24.90
1989	Alquoz	4	Pat Eddery	John Dunlop	1:24.80
1990	Glen Jordan	4	Sergio Dettori	Alduino Botti	1:26.10
1991	Silicon Bavaria	4	Olivier Poirier	Robert Collet	1:25.50
1992	Inner City	3	Frankie Dettori	Luca Cumani	1:27.80
1993	no race
1994	Lavinia Fontana	5	Giovanni Forte	John Dunlop	1:27.40
1995	Lavinia Fontana	6	Giovanni Forte	John Dunlop	1:24.80
1996	Macanal	4	Peter Schiergen	Heinz Jentzsch	1:25.50
1997	Robins	5	Otello Fancera	Alberto Calchetti	1:23.30
1998	Tertullian	3	Andreas Suborics	Peter Schiergen	1:26.40
1999	Tertullian	4	Andreas Suborics	Peter Schiergen	1:28.40
2000	Low Pivot	2	Mario Esposito	Giuseppe Colleo	1:28.20
2001	Salselon	2	Giovanni Forte	Mario Ciciarelli	1:25.00
2002	Salselon	3	Alessandro Parravani	Mario Ciciarelli	1:24.50
2003	Salselon	4	Alessandro Parravani	Mario Ciciarelli	1:25.70
2004	Horeion Directa	5	Gabriele Bietolini	Andreas Löwe	1:27.40
2005	Horeion Directa	6	Gabriele Bietolini	Andreas Löwe	1:25.10
2006	Breath of Love	4	Ioritz Mendizabal	Jean-Claude Rouget	1:25.50
2007	Icelandic	5	Mirco Demuro	Frank Sheridan	1:24.10
2008	White Snow	4	Mario Esposito	Gabriele Miliani	1:24.00
2009	Le Big	5	Andrasch Starke	Uwe Stoltefuss	1:25.60
2010	König Concorde	5	Filip Minarik	Christian Sprengel	1:27.00
2011	König Concorde	6	Filip Minarik	Christian Sprengel	1:35.40
2012	Malagenia	4	Fabio Branca	Luigi Riccardi	1:26.70
2013	Regarde Moi	5	Fabio Branca	Stefano Botti	1:29.50
2014	Gothic Dance	5	Ivan Rossi	Bruno Grizzetti	1:23.80
2015	Pensierieparole	3	Dario Vargiu	Il Cavallo In Testa	1:26.80
2016	Princess Asta	3	Carlo Fiocchi	Mario Hofer	1:24.90
2017	Poeta Diletto	4	Carlo Fiocchi	A Botti	1:25.30
2018	Belle Meade	4	Rob Hornby	Andrew Balding	1:27.20
2019	Dersu Uzala	6	Dario Di Tocco	Marco Gasparini	1:28.40
2020	Black Horus	5	Carlo Fiocchi	Luciano Bietolini	???
2021	Aria Importante	3	Claudio Colombi	Alduino e Stefano Botti	???
2022	I Know Why	4	Dario Di Tocco	E.C. Racing Stable (Endo Botti)	1:25.10
2023	Tawang	3	Dario Vargiu	Grizzetti Galoppo (Bruno Grizzetti)	1:24.8
2024	Anche Meno	4	Claudio Colombi	Danilo Pierdomenico	1:25.7
2025	My Eternal Love	5	Dario Di Tocco	Endo Botti	1:30.3

== Earlier winners ==
- 1971: Alcamo
- 1972: Calahorra
- 1973: Brook
- 1974: Carnauba
- 1975: Raga Navarro
- 1976: Ovac
- 1977: Capo Sunion
- 1978: Croda Alta
- 1979: Absalom
- 1980: Esclavo
- 1981: Emkar
- 1982: no race
- 1983: Nandino
- 1984: Capricorn Belle
- 1985: Life on Mars

== See also ==
- List of Italian flat horse races
