= Ashkalani =

Irish-bred Thoroughbred racehorse

- Sire: Soviet Star
- Grandsire: Nureyev
- Dam: Ashtarka
- Damsire: Dalsaan
- Sex: Staliion
- Foaled: 27 March 1993
- Country: Ireland
- Colour: Chestnut
- Breeder: Aga Khan IV
- Owner: Aga Khan IV
- Trainer: Alain de Royer-Dupré
- Record: 7: 5-1-0
- Earnings: £356,208

Major wins
- Prix Thomas Bryon (1995); Prix de Fontainebleau (1995); Poule d'Essai des Poulains (1995); Prix du Moulin (1996)

Ashkalani (27 March 1993 – 8 October 2015) was an Irish-bred, French-trained Thoroughbred racehorse and sire. He won both of his races as a two-year-old including the Prix Thomas Bryon. In the following spring he won the Prix de Fontainebleau and Poule d'Essai des Poulains before sustaining his first defeat in the St James's Palace Stakes. He went on to win the Prix du Moulin before ending his track career by finishing fifth in the Queen Elizabeth II Stakes. He had moderate results as a breeding stallion.

== Background ==
Ashkalani was a chestnut horse with a white blaze and a long white sock on his right foreleg bred in Ireland by his owner, Aga Khan IV. He was sent into training with Alain de Royer-Dupré in France. He was ridden in most of his races by Gerald Mosse.

He was sired by Soviet Star, an outstanding sprinter-miler whose wins included the Poule d'Essai des Poulains, Sussex Stakes, Prix de la Forêt, July Cup and Prix du Moulin. Soviet Star later became a very successful breeding stallion, siring major winners including. Starcraft, Soviet Line, Starborough, Limpid (Grand Prix de Paris) and Pressing (Premio Roma). Ashkalani's dam Ashtarka won one minor race in France and was a half-sister to the Prix du Cadran winner Shafaraz. Her grandmother Vareta was also the female-line ancestor of Dick Turpin, Zeddaan (Poule d'Essai des Poulains) and Zalaiyka (Poule d'Essai des Pouliches).

== Racing career ==
=== 1995: two-year-old season ===
After winning a minor event (the Prix des Capucines) on his racecourse debut Ashkalani was moved up in class and started the 4/5 favourite for the Group 3 Prix Thomas Bryon over 1600 metres at Saint-Cloud Racecourse on 4 November. He was restrained by Mosse at the rear of the five-runner field before taking the lead in the last 200 metres before drawing away to win "easily" by two and a half lengths.

=== 1996: three-year-old season ===
On 21 April 1996 Ashkalani made his first appearance as a three-year-old in the Group 3 Prix de Fontainebleau over 1600 metres at Longchamp Racecourse and started the 2.7/1 second favourite behind the Grand Critérium winner Loup Solitaire. After racing in fifth place he accelerated in the straight and won "comfortably" by one and a half lengths from Eternity Range, with Spinning World a further two and a half lengths back in third. The Group 1 Poule d'Essai des Poulains over the same course and distance on 12 May saw the colt start the 2/5 favourite against nine opponents including Eternity Range, Spinning World, Danehill Dancer, Tagula (Prix Morny), Cayman Kai (Flying Childers Stakes) and Kahir Almaydan (Mill Reef Stakes). Ashkalani made the final turn in seventh place but made steady progress in the straight, and in a closely contested finish he prevailed by three quarters of a length from Spinning World with Tagula, Cayman Kai and Kahir Almaydan close behind. After the race Mosse described Ashkalani as the best colt he had ever ridden.

At Royal Ascot on 18 June Ashkalani was ridden by Mick Kinane (Mosse was serving a suspension) when he started 13/8 favourite for the St James's Palace Stakes ahead of eight opponents including Spinning World, Mark of Esteem, Bijou d'Inde, Beauchamp King and Cayman Kai. He raced close to the leaders from the start and went to the front a furlong out but was caught on the line and beaten a head by Bijou d'Inde. There was reportedly some criticism of Kinane, as it was felt that he had taken the colt to the front too soon.

The Prix du Moulin over 1600 metres at Longchamp on 9 September saw Ashkalani matched against older horses for the first time. His eight rivals included Shake The Yoke, Spinning World, Carling (Prix de Diane, Prix Vermeille), Le Triton (Prix Jean Prat), Grey Risk (Prix Messidor), Shaanxi (Prix d'Astarte) and Vetheuil (Prix du Muguet). Ashkalani raced in fourth place before taking the lead 200 metres from the finish and won "comfortably" by one and a half lengths and a short head from Spinning World and Shake The Yoke. Three weeks later Ashkalani started the 9/4 favourite for the Queen Elizabeth II Stakes at Ascot but failed to reproduce his best form and came home fifth behind Mark of Esteem, Bosra Sham, First Island and Charnwood Forest.

== Stud record ==
Ashkalani was retired from racing to become a breeding stallion in Ireland. His offspring have included Ashkal Way (Citation Handicap), Ashdown Express (Bentinck Stakes) and Potemkin (Brigadier Gerard Stakes).

== Pedigree ==
Pedigree of Ashkalani (IRE), chestnut stallion, 1989
Sire Soviet Star (USA) 1984	Nureyev; 1977	Northern Dancer (CAN)	Nearctic
Sire Soviet Star (USA) 1984	Nureyev; 1977	Northern Dancer (CAN)	Natalma
Sire Soviet Star (USA) 1984	Nureyev; 1977	Special	Forli
Sire Soviet Star (USA) 1984	Nureyev; 1977	Special	Thong
Sire Soviet Star (USA) 1984	Veruschka (FR); 1967	Venture (GB)	Relic
Sire Soviet Star (USA) 1984	Veruschka (FR); 1967	Venture (GB)	Rose o'Lynn
Sire Soviet Star (USA) 1984	Veruschka (FR); 1967	Marie d'Anjou	Vandale
Sire Soviet Star (USA) 1984	Veruschka (FR); 1967	Marie d'Anjou	Marigold
Dam Ashtarka (GB) 1987	Dalsaan (GB); 1977	Habitat (USA)	Sir Gaylord
Dam Ashtarka (GB) 1987	Dalsaan (GB); 1977	Habitat (USA)	Little Hut
Dam Ashtarka (GB) 1987	Dalsaan (GB); 1977	Dumka (FR)	Kashmir (IRE)
Dam Ashtarka (GB) 1987	Dalsaan (GB); 1977	Dumka (FR)	Faizebad
Dam Ashtarka (GB) 1987	Asharaz; 1967	Sicambre	Prince Bio
Dam Ashtarka (GB) 1987	Asharaz; 1967	Sicambre	Sif
Dam Ashtarka (GB) 1987	Asharaz; 1967	Vareta	Vilmorin (GB)
Dam Ashtarka (GB) 1987	Asharaz; 1967	Vareta	Veronique (Family: 11-g)
