= Lavinia Fontana (horse) =

Irish-bred Thoroughbred racehorse

- Sire: Sharpo
- Grandsire: Sharpen Up
- Dam: Belle Origine
- Damsire: Exclusive Native
- Sex: Mare
- Foaled: 12 April 1989
- Country: Ireland
- Colour: Chestnut
- Breeder: Denis Brosnan
- Owner: Cyril Humphris
- Trainer: Con Collins; John Dunlop
- Record: 36: 9-7-3
- Earnings: £272,970

Major wins
- Prix du Petit Couvert (1993); Premio Umbria (1993); Haydock Sprint Cup (1994); Premio Chiusura (1994, 1995)

Lavinia Fontana (foaled 12 April 1989) was an Irish-bred Thoroughbred racehorse and broodmare. She was a durable sprinter who raced in five countries and won nine of her 36 races between April 1991 and November 1995. Competing mainly in minor races early in her career she won once in 1991 and three times in the following year. She was moved up in class as four-year-old and recorded major victories in both the Prix du Petit Couvert in France and the Premio Umbria in Italy. In the following year she showed her best form in autumn, producing a career-best performance to take the Haydock Sprint Cup in England and winning the Premio Chiusura in Italy. She was less successful as a six-year-old, but did add a second win in the Premio Chiusura before being retired from racing. As a broodmare she produced two minor winners from six foals.

== Background ==
Lavinia Fontana was a chestnut mare with a small white star bred in Ireland by Denis Brosnan. She was owned during her racing career by the art dealer Cyril Humphris who named the filly was named after an Italian painter. She was initially sent into training with Con Collins at The Curragh in County Kildare.

She was one of the best horses sired by Sharpo, a sprinter whose wins included three consecutive runnings of the William Hill Sprint Championship. His other offspring included College Chapel (winner of the Prix Maurice de Gheest), Penny Drops (Sandown Mile), Sharp Prod (Moët & Chandon Rennen), Gorse (Holsten-Trophy), Port Lucaya (Premio Vittorio di Capua), Sharpical (Tote Gold Trophy) and Dark 'n Sharp (Red Rum Handicap Chase).

Lavinia Fontana's dam Belle Origine was a Kentucky-bred mare who never raced, but was descended from Easy Lass, the dam of Coaltown and Wistful.

== Racing career ==
=== 1991 & 1992: early career ===
In 1991 Lavinia Fontana finished unplaced in minor races at April and May at the Curragh Racecourse before contesting a maiden race over six furlongs at Naas Racecourse on 6 July. Ridden by P V Gilson she started the 5/4 favourite and won by a head from the Dermot Weld-trained Evocative.

Lavinia Fontana spent 1992 in Ireland, running mainly in minor sprint races. After finishing unplaced in her first three starts she finished second in a handicap race over five furlongs at Tralee on 23 August and then recorded her first success of the year over the same course and distance three days later. She then ran three times in handicaps over six furlongs at the Curragh finishing third on 3 September, winning two weeks later before producing her best performance up to that time on 10 October when she won by eight lengths from Felsen on yielding ground. On her final appearance of the season the filly was moved up in class and distance for the Listed Garnet Stakes at Naas and finished second to the Jim Bolger-trained Nordic Pageant having briefly taken the lead in the final furlong.

In October 1992 the filly was entered in the Goffs sale but was withdrawn before the auction.

=== 1993: four-year-old season ===
Lavinia Fontana began her third season by finishing third in a minor stakes race at Leopardstown Racecourse in March and then showed improved form to finish second to Asema in the Athasi Stakes at the Curragh in April. In the following month she contested her first Group race and finished sixth of the fourteen runners behind College Chapel in the Greenlands Stakes at the Curragh. After a break of three months she returned to the track and finished unplaced behind the colt Bradawn Breever in handicaps at the Curragh on 21 August and 18 September. On 2 October in the Listed Waterford Testimonial Stakes she came out second best to Bradawn Breever, beaten a head after sustained struggle in the final furlong.

The filly was sent overseas for the first time when she contested the Group Three Prix du Petit Couvert over 1000 metres at Longchamp Racecourse on 24 October. Ridden by Frankie Dettori she took the lead 200 metres and won by two and a half lengths from the three-year-old filly Palacegate Episode with Zieten (winner of the Middle Park Stakes) a further two and a half lengths back in third. Lavinia Fontana was then sent to Italy for the Group Two Premio Umbria over 1200 metres at Capannelle Racecourse in Rome on 21 November. Racing on heavy ground and ridden by Alan Munro she took the lead approaching the last 200 metres and went clear of the field to win by two lengths from Branston Abby.

=== 1994: five-year-old season ===
Before the start of the 1994 season Lavinia Fontana was transferred to England and joined the stable of John Dunlop at Arundel in West Sussex. On her first appearance for her new trainer she finished fourth to College Chapel in the Greenlands Stakes and then made a promising British debut when she finished second to the outstanding racemare Lochsong in the Temple Stakes at Sandown Park Racecourse on 30 May. In July she started a 33/1 outsider for the July Cup at Newmarket Racecourse and finished last of the nine runners behind Owington before being sent to France for the Prix Maurice de Gheest and producing a much better effort on softer ground as she finished third behind Dolphin Street and Catrail.

On 3 September Lavinia Fontana was one of eight horses to contest the Sprint Cup over six furlongs at Haydock Park and was ridden for the first time by Jason Weaver. In a race run in driving rain she started the 11/2 fourth choice in the betting behind Owington, Unblest (Champagne Stakes) and Zieten. The other four runners were Piccolo, Stack Rock (Hopeful Stakes), Blyton Lad (Rous Stakes) and Tabook. In a change of tactics the mare went to the front after two furlongs and set the pace before accelerating clear of the field in the final furlong. She won "comfortably" by three and a half lengths from Piccolo with the favourite Owington half a length away in third.

Lavinia Fontana made four more appearances in the late autumn of 1994. In October she finished seventh to Lochsong in the Prix de l'Abbaye over 1000 metres at Longchamp and then ran unplaced behind Bigstone in the Prix de la Forêt over 1400 metres at the same track. On 9 November she was sent to Italy again for the Group Three Premio Chiusura over 1400 metres on heavy ground at the San Siro Racecourse in Milan. Ridden by Giovanni Forte she led from the start and won "very easily" by two and a quarter lengths from the four-year-old colt Taufan Black. The mare ended her season by attempting to repeat her 1993 success in the Premio Umbria but finished unplaced behind the Peter Chapple-Hyam-trained Thousla Rock.

=== 1995: six-year-old season ===
As a six-year-old, Lavinia Fontana did not appear until June, when she finished second to Les Boyer in the Premio Emilio Turati over 1600 metres in Milan. She was then off the course until August when she finished sixth to Cherokee Rose in the Prix Maurice de Gheest and was then sent to Germany where she finished second to Hever Golf Rose in the Goldene Peitsche. In September she attempted to repeat her 1994 success in the Haydock Sprint Cup but finished last of the six runners behind Cherokee Rose and on 1 October she ran fifth behind Hever Golf Rose in the Prix de l'Abbaye. On 4 Milan the mare ran for the second time in the Premio Chiusura and was again partnered by Giovanni Forte. After tracking the leaders she took the lead 200 metres from the finish and stayed on well to win by half a length from Imprevedibile. On her final racecourse appearance Lavinia Fontana finished sixth behind Beat of Drums in the Premio Umbria on 19 November.

== Breeding record ==
Lavinia Fontana was retired from racing to become a broodmare. She produced at least six foals and two minor winners between 1998 and 2007:

- Oreana, a bay filly, foaled in 1998, sired by Anabaa. Won one race in England.
- Esgrima, filly, 1999, by Sadler's Wells. Failed to win in two races.
- La Tintoretta, bay filly, 2000, by Desert Prince. Won one race in Ireland.
- Epitimos Proedros, bay colt, 2005, by Red Ransom. Unraced.
- Crimson Mist, bay colt (later gelded), 2006, by Red Ransom. Failed to win in three races.
- Rodrigo Fontana, colt (later gelded), 2007, by Red Ransom. Failed to win in two races.

== Pedigree ==
Pedigree of Lavinia Fontana (IRE), chestnut mare, 1989
Sire Sharpo (GB) 1977	Sharpen Up (GB); 1969	Atan	Native Dancer
Sire Sharpo (GB) 1977	Sharpen Up (GB); 1969	Atan	Mixed Marriage
Sire Sharpo (GB) 1977	Sharpen Up (GB); 1969	Rocchetta	Rockefella
Sire Sharpo (GB) 1977	Sharpen Up (GB); 1969	Rocchetta	Chambiges
Sire Sharpo (GB) 1977	Moiety Bird (GB); 1971	Falcon	Milesian
Sire Sharpo (GB) 1977	Moiety Bird (GB); 1971	Falcon	Pretty Swift
Sire Sharpo (GB) 1977	Moiety Bird (GB); 1971	Gasca	Gilles de Retz
Sire Sharpo (GB) 1977	Moiety Bird (GB); 1971	Gasca	Sally Deans
Dam Belle Origine (USA) 1982	Exclusive Native (USA); 1965	Raise a Native	Native Dancer
Dam Belle Origine (USA) 1982	Exclusive Native (USA); 1965	Raise a Native	Raise You
Dam Belle Origine (USA) 1982	Exclusive Native (USA); 1965	Exclusive	Shut Out
Dam Belle Origine (USA) 1982	Exclusive Native (USA); 1965	Exclusive	Good Example
Dam Belle Origine (USA) 1982	Belle Sorella (USA); 1969	Ribot	Tenerani
Dam Belle Origine (USA) 1982	Belle Sorella (USA); 1969	Ribot	Romanella
Dam Belle Origine (USA) 1982	Belle Sorella (USA); 1969	Island Creek	Khaled
Dam Belle Origine (USA) 1982	Belle Sorella (USA); 1969	Island Creek	Rippling Rythm (Family: 7-e)

- Lavinia Fontana was inbred 4 × 4 to Native Dancer, meaning that this stallion appears twice in the fourth generation of her pedigree.
