= Premio Carlo e Francesco Aloisi =

Premio Umbria
- Class: Listed
- Location: Capannelle Racecourse; Rome, Italy
- Race type: Flat / Thoroughbred
- Website: Capannelle

Race information
- Distance: 1,200 metres (6f)
- Surface: Turf
- Track: Straight
- Qualification: Two-years-old and up
- Weight: 51 kg (2yo); 59 kg (3yo+); Allowances; 1½ kg for fillies and mares Penalties; 4½ kg for Group 1 winners * 3 kg for Group 2 winners * 2 kg for Group 3 winners * 2 kg if three Listed wins * 1 kg if two Listed wins * * since January 1
- Purse: €61,600 (2014); 1st: €23,800

The Premio Umbria is a Listed flat horse race in Italy open to thoroughbreds aged two years or older. It is run at Capannelle over a distance of 1,200 metres (about 6 furlongs), and it is scheduled to take place each year in November.

== History ==
The Premio Umbria is named after Umbria, a region of central Italy.

For a period the Premio Umbria held Group 3 status. It was promoted to Group 2 level in 1982, and relegated back to Group 3 in 1988. It was relegated to Listed in 2023.

The race was called Premio Carlo e Francesco Aloisi from 2007 to 2021. It was run in memory of Carlo Aloisi (died 1990s) and his brother Francesco (died 2007). Carlo was a former president of UNIRE, a governing body of horse racing in Italy, and Francesco was president of the Jockey Club Italiano.

== Records ==
Most successful horse since 1971 (3 wins):

- Rosendhal – 2010, 2012 (dead-heat), 2013

Leading jockey since 1986 (3 wins):

- Salvatore Sulas – Thinking Robins (2009, dead-heat), Rosendhal (2012, dead-heat, 2013)

Leading trainer since 1986 (3 wins):

- Armando Renzoni – Dancing Eagle (1987), Arranvanna (1991), Rosendhal (2010)

== Winners since 1986 ==
| Year | Winner | Age | Jockey | Trainer | Time |
|---|---|---|---|---|---|
| 1986 | Tarib | 3 | Richard Hills | Harry Thomson Jones |
| 1987 | Dancing Eagle | 4 | Giuseppe di Chio | Armando Renzoni | 1:12.50 |
| 1988 | Canango | 4 | Guy Guignard | Alain Falourd | 1:00.90 |
| 1989 | Piero Gardino | 4 | Luca Sorrentino | P. Miliani | 1:10.60 |
| 1990 | Dictator's Song | 3 | Éric Legrix | Robert Collet |
| 1991 | Arranvanna | 3 | Vincenzo Mezzatesta | Armando Renzoni | 1:12.90 |
| 1992 | Swing Low | 3 | Richard Quinn | Richard Hannon Sr. | 1:11.40 |
| 1993 | Lavinia Fontana | 4 | Alan Munro | Con Collins | 1:10.90 |
| 1994 | Thousla Rock | 5 | John Reid | Peter Chapple-Hyam | 1:10.50 |
| 1995 | Beat of Drums | 4 | Fernando Jovine | Giuseppe Botti | 1:09.60 |
| 1996 | Golden Oriental | 2 | Otello Fancera | Giuliano Fratini | 1:10.30 |
| 1997 | Uruk | 3 | Lucio Ficuciello | Lorenzo Brogi | 1:11.30 |
| 1998 | Blu Carillon | 3 | Marco Monteriso | Ovidio Pessi | 1:09.80 |
| 1999 | Key Royal | 5 | Georg Bocskai | Mario Hofer | 1:11.70 |
| 2000 | Development | 5 | Jorge Horcajada | Luigi Mele | 1:11.90 |
| 2001 | Nil | 8 | Michel Planard | S. Benedetti | 1:09.60 |
| 2002 | Danehurst | 4 | Seb Sanders | Sir Mark Prescott | 1:11.00 |
| 2003 | Glad to Be Fast | 3 | William Mongil | Mario Hofer | 1:09.20 |
| 2004 | St Paul House | 6 | Paolo Aragoni | Daniele Camuffo | 1:09.90 |
| 2005 | St Paul House | 7 | Paolo Aragoni | Giuseppe di Chio | 1:10.40 |
| 2006 | Patapan | 4 | Fabio Branca | Roberto Brogi | 1:08.00 |
| 2007 | Dream Impact | 6 | Germano Marcelli | Luigi Riccardi | 1:09.20 |
| 2008 | Overdose | 3 | Andreas Suborics | Sandor Ribarszki | 1:10.00 |
| 2009 (dh) | Morgan Drive; Thinking Robins | 4; 6 | Mirco Demuro; Salvatore Sulas | Marco Gasparini; Alessandro Turco | 1:08.20 |
| 2010 | Rosendhal | 3 | Marco Monteriso | Armando Renzoni | 1:10.40 |
| 2011 | Overdose | 6 | Frankie Dettori | Jozef Roszival | 1:08.40 |
| 2012 (dh) | Blu Constellation; Rosendhal | 4; 5 | Dario Vargiu; Salvatore Sulas | Raffaele Biondi; Giuseppe Botti | 1:09.85 |
| 2013 | Rosendhal | 6 | Salvatore Sulas | Giuseppe Botti | 1:09.62 |
| 2014 | Farmah | 3 | François-Xavier Bertras | François Rohaut | 1:08.20 |
| 2015 | Plusquemavie | 4 | Gianpasquale Fois | Vincenzo Fazio | 1:07.30 |
| 2016 | Kathy Dream | 4 | Salvatore Basile | Luigi Biagetti | 1:09.50 |
| 2017 | My Lea | 3 | Carlo Fiocchi | Vincenzo Fazio | 1:07.20 |
| 2018 | Charline Royale | 3 | Salvatore Basile | Silvia Amendola | 1:10.10 |
| 2019 | Nikisophia | 3 | Giuseppe Ercegovic | Maurizio Grassi | 1:09.70 |
| 2020 | The Conqueror | 5 | Fabio Branca | Alduino Botti | 1:07.86 |
| 2021 | Agiato | 4 | Fabio Branca | Grizzetti Galoppo SRL | 1:09.03 |

== Earlier winners ==
- 1971: Azzeccagarbuglio
- 1972: Arnaldo da Brescia
- 1973: Azzeccagarbuglio
- 1974: Pipino
- 1975: Pipino
- 1976: My Royal Prima
- 1977: Dublin Taxi
- 1978: Tanfirion
- 1979: Super Sky
- 1980: Godot
- 1981: Super Sky
- 1982: Bold Apparel
- 1983: Kirchner
- 1984: Proskona
- 1985: Nacacyte

== See also ==
- List of Italian flat horse races
