= Testimonial Stakes =

Flat horse race in Ireland

Testimonial Stakes
2022
| Moss Tucker | Big Gossey | Life In Colour |

Previous years
2021
| Power Under Me | Teresa Mendoza | Star In The Making |

2020-2011
2020
Lustown Baba | Could Be King | Downforce
2019
Make A Challenge | Downforce | Urban Beat
2018
Medicine Jack | Lost Treasure | Smash Williams
2017
Texas Rock | Son Of Rest | Maarek
2016
Shanghai Glory | Master Speaker | Bebhinn
2015
Fort Del Oro | The Happy Prince | Gathering Power
2014
Viztoria | Gathering Power | An Saighdiur
2013
Balmont Mast | Angels Will Fall | Red Dubawi
2012
Katla | Maarek | Colour Of Love
2011
Eton Rifles | Seeharn | Cheviot

2010-2001
2010
Luisant | Definightly | Song Of My Heart
2009
Rayeni | Luisant | Genki
2008
Le Cadre Noir | Snaefell | Benbaun
2007
US Ranger | Senor Benny | Benwilt Breeze
2006
Ugo Fire | Senor Benny | Cheyenne Star
2005
Miss Sally | Majestic Times | Hard Rock City
2004
Striking Ambition | Grand Reward | Senor Benny
2003
Hanabad | Millybaa | Golden Nun
2002
Captain Rio | One Won One | Kier Park
2001
Spencers Wood | John Dorans Melody | Princess Nutley

2000-1997
2000
Cobourg Lodge | Anna Elise | Tiger Royal
1999
Rolo Tomasi | Social Harmony | Namid
1998
Burden Of Proof | Tinker Amelia | Alarme Belle
1997
Burden Of Proof | Alarme Belle | Orange Grouse

The Waterford Testimonial Stakes is a Listed flat horse race in Ireland open to thoroughbreds aged three years or older. It is run at The Curragh over a distance of 6 furlongs (1,207 metres), and it is scheduled to take place each year in October.

== Records ==
Most successful horse (2 wins):

- Burden Of Proof – 1997, 1998
- Carla Ridge - 2025, 2026

Leading jockey (5 wins):

- Johnny Murtagh – Hanabad (2003), Striking Ambition (2004), Miss Sally (2005), Eton Rifles (2011), Balmont Mast (2013)

Leading trainer (4 wins):

- Edward Lynam – Rolo Tomasi (1999), Balmont Mast (2013), Viztoria (2014), Fort Del Oro (2015)

== Winners ==
| Year | Winner | Age | Jockey | Trainer | Time |
|---|---|---|---|---|---|
| 1997 | Burden Of Proof | 5 | Pat Smullen | Charles O'Brien | 1:20.00 |
| 1998 | Burden Of Proof | 6 | Seamie Heffernan | Aidan O'Brien | 1:17.70 |
| 1999 | Rolo Tomasi | 3 | Eddie Ahern | Edward Lynam | 1:17.20 |
| 2000 | Cobourg Lodge | 4 | Pat Shanahan | J T Gorman | 1:17.90 |
| 2001 | Spencers Wood | 4 | Seb Sanders | Peter Makin | 1:18.90 |
| 2002 | Captain Rio | 3 | Fran Berry | Richard Whitaker | 1:13.60 |
| 2003 | Hanabad | 3 | Johnny Murtagh | John Oxx | 1:13.50 |
| 2004 | Striking Ambition | 4 | Johnny Murtagh | Roger Charlton | 1:15.10 |
| 2005 | Miss Sally | 3 | Johnny Murtagh | Michael Halford | 1:16.70 |
| 2006 | Ugo Fire | 3 | Declan McDonogh | Kevin Prendergast | 1:20.30 |
| 2007 | US Ranger | 3 | Kieren Fallon | Aidan O'Brien | 1:16.15 |
| 2008 | Le Cadre Noir | 4 | Pat Smullen | Dermot Weld | 1:13.96 |
| 2009 | Rayeni | 3 | Michael Kinane | John Oxx | 1:15.28 |
| 2010 | Luisant | 7 | Colm O'Donoghue | James Nash | 1:13.58 |
| 2011 | Eton Rifles | 6 | Johnny Murtagh | David Elsworth | 1:15.50 |
| 2012 | Katla | 4 | Seamie Heffernan | John Grogan | 1:20.32 |
| 2013 | Balmont Mast | 5 | Johnny Murtagh | Edward Lynam | 1:12.27 |
| 2014 | Viztoria | 4 | Pat Smullen | Edward Lynam | 1:12.59 |
| 2015 | Fort Del Oro | 3 | Billy Lee | Edward Lynam | 1:12.10 |
| 2016 | Shanghai Glory | 3 | William Buick | Charles Hills | 1:14.21 |
| 2017 | Texas Rock (Note: The 2017 and 2018 runnings took place at Navan over a slightly shorter distance) | 6 | Fran Berry | Michael Grassick | 1:15.50 |
| 2018 | Medicine Jack | 4 | Colin Keane | Ger Lyons | 1:13.02 |
| 2019 | Make a Challenge | 4 | James Doyle | Denis Hogan | 1:16.70 |
| 2020 | Lustown Baba | 3 | Leigh Roche | Willie McCreery | 1:16.53 |
| 2021 | Power Under Me | 3 | Colin Keane | Ger Lyons | 1:14.51 |
| 2022 | Are We Dreaming | 3 | Billy Lee | Willie McCreery | 1:15.41 |
| 2023 | Aussie Girl | 3 | Colin Keane | Fozzy Stack | 1:15.19 |
| 2024 | Oujda | 4 | Shane Foley | Johnny Murtagh | 1:13.74 |
| 2025 | Carla Ridge | 3 | Chris Hayes | Eddie & Patrick Harty | 1:13.29 |
| 2026 | Carla Ridge | 4 | Chris Hayes | Eddie & Patrick Harty | 1:15.71 |

== See also ==
- Horse racing in Ireland
- List of Irish flat horse races
