= St Nicholas Abbey (horse) =

Irish-bred Thoroughbred racehorse

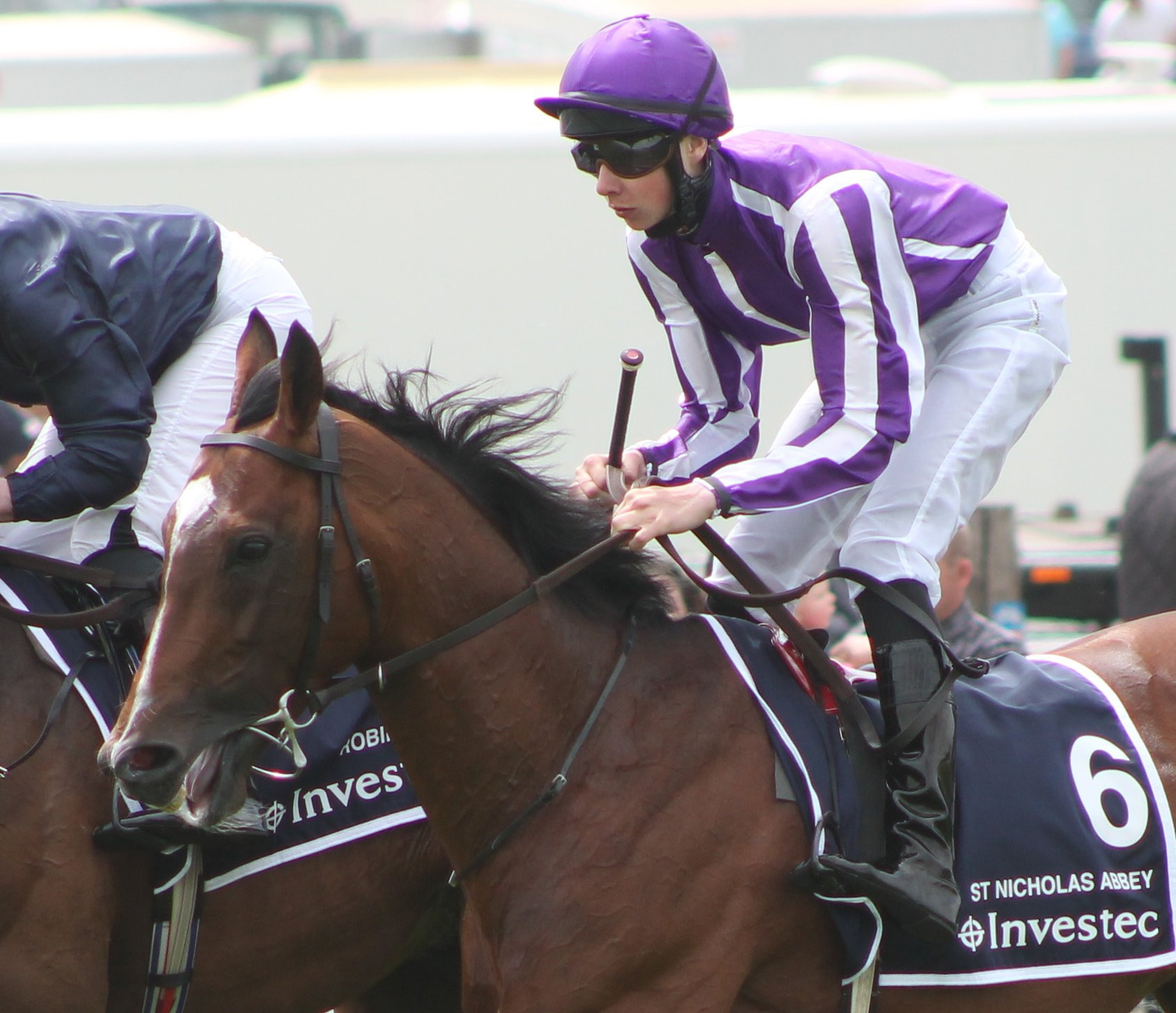
- St Nicholas Abbey at the 2012 Coronation Cup
- Sire: Montjeu
- Grandsire: Sadler's Wells
- Dam: Leaping Water
- Damsire: Sure Blade
- Sex: Stallion
- Foaled: 13 April 2007
- Country: Ireland
- Colour: Bay
- Breeder: Barton Bloodstock & Villiers Synd
- Owner: Derrick Smith, Michael Tabor & Sue Magnier
- Trainer: Aidan O'Brien
- Record: 21: 9-2-7
- Earnings: £4,954,590

Major wins
- Beresford Stakes (2009); Racing Post Trophy (2009); Ormonde Stakes (2011); Coronation Cup (2011, 2012, 2013); Breeders' Cup Turf (2011); Dubai Sheema Classic (2013)

Honours
- European Champion Two-year-old colt (2009)

St Nicholas Abbey (13 April 2007 – 14 January 2014) was an Irish thoroughbred racehorse. He was the leading European two-year-old of 2009 and recovered from a disappointing three-year-old season to win the Coronation Cup and the Breeders' Cup Turf in 2011. He won the Coronation Cup for a second time in 2012 and the Dubai Sheema Classic in 2013. In June 2013 he won the Coronation Cup for an unprecedented third time. He was briefly the biggest money-winning racehorse trained in Europe. His career was ended prematurely due to injury in July 2013, and he was euthanized on 14 January 2014 while undergoing colic surgery.

== Background ==
St Nicholas Abbey, a bay horse with a white star and stripe and two white feet, was bred in Ireland by Barton Bloodstock & the Villiers Syndicate, a group associated with the Coolmore Stud. He is one of many top-class middle-distance horses and stayers sired by Montjeu. Others include the Derby winners Pour Moi, Authorized, Camelot and Motivator, the St Leger winners Scorpion and Masked Marvel and the Prix de l'Arc de Triomphe winner Hurricane Run. St Nicholas Abbey's dam, Leaping Water was an unraced daughter of the Moyglare Stud Stakes winner Flamenco Wave and a half-sister of the Group One winners Ballingarry (Canadian International Stakes), Aristotle (Racing Post Trophy) and Starborough (St James's Palace Stakes).

As a yearling, he was consigned by the Oaks Farm Stud to the Tattersalls sales in October 2008 where he was bought for 200,000 guineas by the bloodstock agent Demi O'Byrne on behalf of John Magnier's Coolmore organisation. Like many Coolmore horse's, the details of St Nicholas Abbey's ownership have altered from race to race: he has been officially "owned" by various combinations and individuals including Derrick Smith, Susan Magnier and Michael Tabor. He has been trained throughout his racing career by Aidan O'Brien at Ballydoyle. He is named after St Nicholas Abbey in Barbados. He is often referred to as "St Nick".

== Racing career ==
=== 2009: two-year-old season ===
St Nicholas Abbey made his first appearance on heavy ground at the Curragh on 16 August. He was "impressive" in winning a one-mile maiden race by four lengths. In September he was moved up to Group Two class for the Beresford Stakes. He started 2/5 favourite and won "comfortably" by three quarters of a length from Layali Al Andalus. After his win, O'Brien called the colt "very exciting and one to look forward to" while the bookmaker Paddy Power made him 8/1 favourite for the following year's Epsom Derby.

In October, St Nicholas Abbey was sent to England to contest the Racing Post Trophy at Doncaster. Ridden by Johnny Murtagh, he took the lead a furlong from the finish and accelerated clear to win by three and three quarter lengths from Elusive Pimpernel. The Daily Mirror described his performance as "brilliant" and reported that he was as short as 3/1 favourite for the Derby. Marcus Armytage in the Daily Telegraph described the performance as "hugely impressive" and identified St Nicholas Abbey as a potential successor to the recently retired Sea the Stars.

In November, St Nicholas Abbey was named European Champion Two-year-old colt at the Cartier Racing Awards. In January 2012 he was officially rated the best two-year-old in Europe with an "outstanding" rating of 124.

=== 2010: three-year-old season ===
In March, St Nicholas Abbey performed impressively in a public trial at the Curragh, finishing clear of several other O'Brien-trained three-year-olds. St Nicholas Abbey made his three-year-old debut in the 2,000 Guineas Stakes at Newmarket on 1 May and started evens favourite against eighteen opponents. He appeared to be outpaced in the closing stages and finished sixth behind Makfi, Dick Turpin, Canford Cliffs, Xtension and Elusive Pimpernel. After the race O'Brien professed himself to be satisfied with his St Nicholas Abbey's performance, and explained that the colt had been unsuited by the uneven pace. The 2000 Guineaas was to be St Nicholas Abbey's only appearance of the season. He was still among the leading contenders for the Epsom Derby but was withdrawn after appearing to be "stiff behind" when appearing for exercise shortly before the race. St Nicholas Abbey was expected to return for a race at the Curragh in October, but was withdrawn, with O'Brien describing him as "not quite ready" although there was some speculation that his failure to run was motivated by a desire to protect his stud value.

=== 2011: four-year-old season ===
In his first race for eleven months, St Nicholas Abbey started odds-on favourite for the Listed Alleged Stakes over ten furlongs at the Curragh, but finished third to the mare Unaccompanied. At Chester a month later St Nicholas Abbey accelerated clear in the closing stages to win the Ormonde Stakes by nine lengths, recording his first victory for eighteen months. At Epsom in June he followed up by winning the Coronation Cup from Midday and three others. Ridden by Ryan Moore he appeared outpaced by the English filly early in the straight but stayed on strongly to lead in the final 75 yards. After the race, O'Brien called the winner "a great horse" and admitted that he had "messed him up last year". St Nicholas Abbey then finished third to Nathaniel and Workforce in the King George VI and Queen Elizabeth Stakes and third again to Sarafina and Hiruno d'Amour in the Prix Foy at Longchamp Racecourse.

In the Prix de l'Arc de Triomphe at Longchamp in October, St Nicholas Abbey, ridden by his trainer's son Joseph O'Brien, took the lead in the straight but was soon overtaken by Danedream and weakened in the closing stages to finish fifth of the sixteen runners. On his final start of the year, St Nicholas Abbey was sent to Churchill Downs for the Breeders' Cup Turf. O'Brien restrained St Nicholas Abbey in the early stages, before switching the colt to the outside to make his challenge in the straight. St Nicholas Abbey overtook the American colt Brilliant Speed inside the final furlong and quickly drew clear to win by two and a half lengths from Sea Moon.

At the end of the year, St Nicholas Abbey was given a rating of 124 in the World Thoroughbred Racehorse Rankings, making him the fourteenth best racehorse in the world and placing him fourth in the "L" (long distance) category.

=== 2012: five-year-old season ===
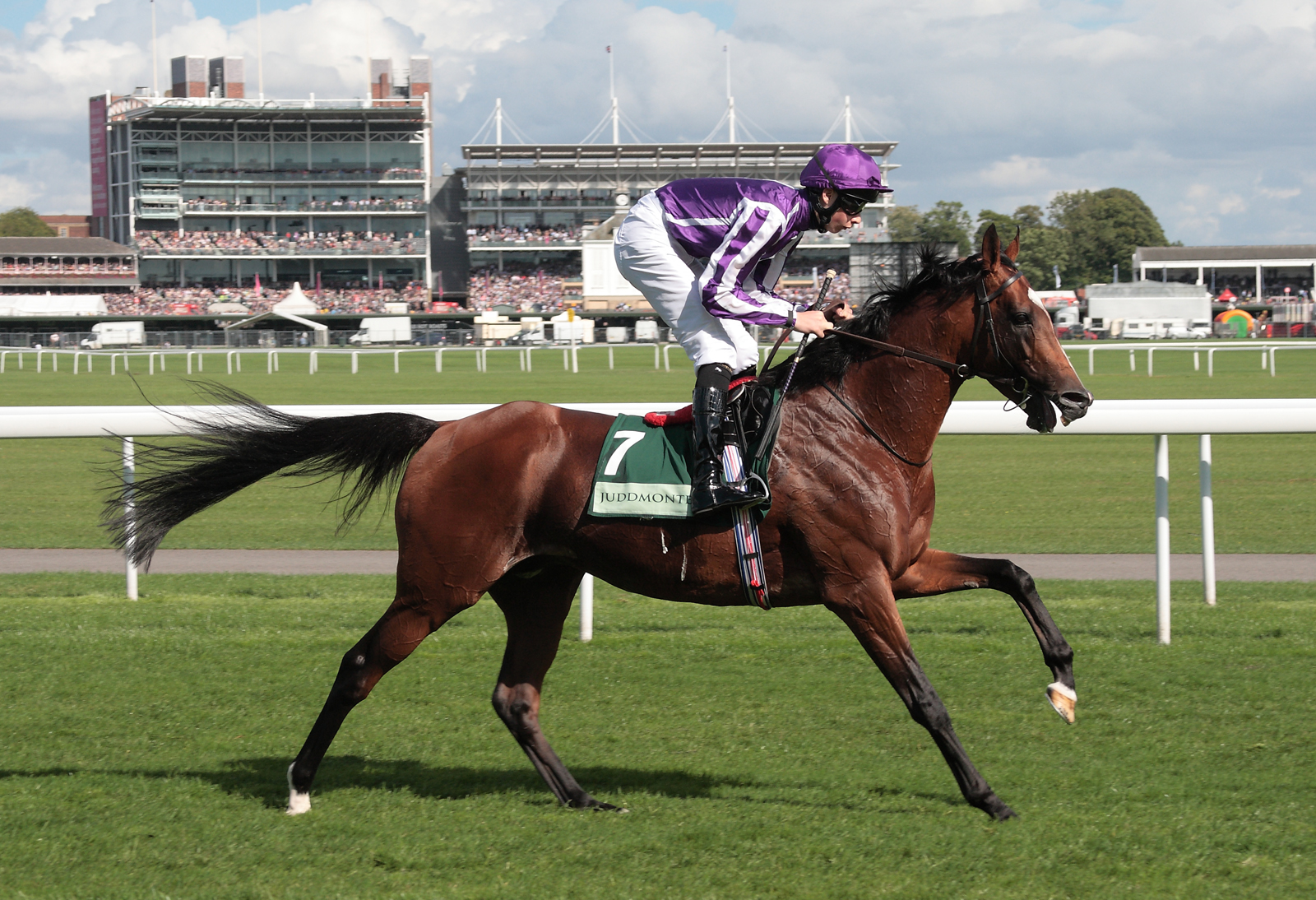
St Nicholas Abbey at York, 2012

On St Nicholas Abbey's first appearance of the 2012 season he took second place in the Dubai Sheema Classic, a neck behind Cirrus des Aigles. On his return to Ireland and started 2/5 favourite for the Mooresbridge Stakes at the Curragh. He was settled in third place by Joseph O'Brien as the Coolmore pacemaker Windsor Palace built up a big lead. St Nicholas Abbey stayed on strongly in the straight but failed to catch Windsor Castle, finishing second by a length.

On 2 June, St Nicholas Abbey attempted to win his second Coronation Cup. He was ridden confidently by O'Brien who held the horse up at the rear of the field in the early stages before making his challenge in the straight. He produced what the Irish Independent described as "a brilliant turn of foot" to take the lead and went clear of his opponents to win by four and a half lengths from Red Cadeaux and Masked Marvel. St Nicholas Abbey was made third favourite for the King George VI and Queen Elizabeth Stakes at Ascot on 21 July. He was restrained in last place by O'Brien before finishing strongly to take third place behind Danedream and Nathaniel. In the International Stakes at York in August, racing over ten and a half furlongs, he was beaten seven lengths by the winner Frankel and lost second place by a nose to Farhh. St Nicholas Abbey ran again over ten furlongs in the Irish Champion Stakes on 8 September when he finished third to Snow Fairy and Nathaniel. In the Prix de l'Arc de Triomphe, run on extremely soft ground, he was never in serious contention and finished eleventh of the eighteen runners behind Solemia. In November St Nicholas Abbey was sent to Santa Anita to defend the Breeder's Cup Turf. He made some late progress but was unable to repeat his 2011 success, finishing third to Little Mike and Point of Entry.

St Nicholas Abbey was given a rating of 124 in the 2012 World Thoroughbred Racehorse Rankings, making him the thirteenth best racehorse in the world and placing him equal-third in the "L" (long distance) category.

=== 2013: six-year-old season ===
As in the previous season, St Nicholas Abbey began his season with a run in the Dubai Sheema Classic. Starting at odds of 11/4 he took the lead three furlongs from the finish and held off the challenge of the Japanese filly Gentildonna to win by two and a quarter lengths. After the race Aidan O'Brien admitted that he had always felt that the horse needed to be held up in races and that the decision to change tactics and track the leader had been made by Joseph O'Brien and Derrick Smith. On 1 June St Nicholas Abbey contested the Coronation Cup for the third time in which he was opposed by the Melbourne Cup winner Dunaden. Ridden by Joseph O'Brien, he took the lead in the straight and won from Dunaden, making him the first horse to win three Investec Coronation Cups.

In July St Nicholas Abbey was aimed at the King George VI and Queen Elizabeth Stakes and was made the ante-post favourite ahead of Cirrus des Aigles, Trading Leather and Novellist. On 23 July, four days before the race, the horse sustained a serious leg injury (described as a "fractured pastern") during exercise at Ballydoyle, ending his racing career and putting his life in danger. On the following day, the horse underwent surgery at Fethard Equine Hospital aimed at saving him for a stud career. On 25 July Coolmore announced that the horse was "comfortable", but remained in intensive care and had "many bridges to cross before he is considered out of danger". On the following day it was announced that the horse had suffered a "major setback" after contracting colic which necessitated additional surgery. St Nicholas Abbey made a good recovery over the following week. Coolmore released details of the surgical procedures: twenty screws and a steel pin had been inserted into St Nicholas Abbey's leg and a bone-graft from the horse's hip had been used to improve blood supply to the afflicted limb. The Fethard Hospital's Doctor Tom O'Brien described his patient as "a very, very tough horse".

At the time of his injury, St Nicholas Abbey was rated the seventh best racehorse in the world.

=== 2014: Death ===
St Nicholas Abbey was euthanised on the morning of January 14, 2014, due to complications from colic surgery. Coolmore Stud announced that the surgery revealed a severe strangulating colon torsion which led to the decision to euthanize on humane grounds. Coolmore thanked the surgeons and the Fethard Hospital for tending care to the horse, and thanked everyone that had sent well wishes.

== Pedigree ==
Pedigree of St Nicholas Abbey (IRE), bay stallion, 2007
Sire Montjeu (IRE) 1996	Sadler's Wells; 1981	Northern Dancer	Nearctic
Sire Montjeu (IRE) 1996	Sadler's Wells; 1981	Northern Dancer	Natalma
Sire Montjeu (IRE) 1996	Sadler's Wells; 1981	Fairy Bridge	Bold Reason
Sire Montjeu (IRE) 1996	Sadler's Wells; 1981	Fairy Bridge	Special
Sire Montjeu (IRE) 1996	Floripedes; 1985	Top Ville	High Top
Sire Montjeu (IRE) 1996	Floripedes; 1985	Top Ville	Sega Ville
Sire Montjeu (IRE) 1996	Floripedes; 1985	Toute Cy	Tennyson
Sire Montjeu (IRE) 1996	Floripedes; 1985	Toute Cy	Adele Toumignon
Dam Leaping Water (GB) 1990	Sure Blade; 1983	Kris	Sharpen Up
Dam Leaping Water (GB) 1990	Sure Blade; 1983	Kris	Doubly Sure
Dam Leaping Water (GB) 1990	Sure Blade; 1983	Double Lock	Home Guard
Dam Leaping Water (GB) 1990	Sure Blade; 1983	Double Lock	St. Padina
Dam Leaping Water (GB) 1990	Flamenco Wave; 1986	Desert Wine	Damascus
Dam Leaping Water (GB) 1990	Flamenco Wave; 1986	Desert Wine	Anne Campbell
Dam Leaping Water (GB) 1990	Flamenco Wave; 1986	Armada Way	Sadair
Dam Leaping Water (GB) 1990	Flamenco Wave; 1986	Armada Way	Hurry Call (Family: 16-g)
