= Holding Court (horse) =

British-bred Thoroughbred racehorse

- Sire: Hernando
- Grandsire: Niniski
- Dam: Indian Love Song
- Damsire: Be My Guest
- Sex: Stallion
- Foaled: 17 February 1997
- Country: United Kingdom
- Colour: Bay
- Breeder: Pauline & John Good
- Owner: Pauline & John Good
- Trainer: Brian Meehan; Michael Jarvis
- Record: 16: 5-1-2
- Earnings: £353,855

Major wins
- Prix La Force (2000); Prix du Jockey Club (2000); Grand Prix de Deauville (2001)

Holding Court (foaled 27 February 1997) was a British Thoroughbred racehorse and sire. In a racing career which lasted from September 1999 until January 2002 he ran sixteen times and won five races. Originally trained by Brian Meehan, he showed promise as a two-year-old before being moved to Michael Jarvis's stable in the spring of 2000. After winning a handicap race on his first appearance as a three-year-old he was campaigned un France where he won the Prix La Force before recording his biggest success when he won the Prix du Jockey Club by six lengths. He was beaten in his three remaining races that year but returned as a four-year-old to win the Grand Prix de Deauville. In the autumn of 2000 he was exported to Saudi Arabia where he had no success racing on dirt and had no impact at stud. Holding Court was suited by front-running tactics and showed a marked preference for soft ground.

== Background ==
Holding Court was a bay horse with a white blaze bred in the United Kingdom by Pauline & John Good. He was from the first crop of foals sired by the Prix du Jockey Club winner Hernando, who went on to sire other major winners including Sulamani and Look Here. His dam Indian Love Song was a poor racehorse, who failed to win in 33 races, but came from a good family, being a granddaughter of The Oaks runner-up Maina. Apart from Holding Court, Indian Love Song produced Tomba (also by Hernando) who won thirteen races including the Prix de la Forêt.

The Goods sent their colt into training with Brian Meehan at Lambourn in Berkshire.

== Racing career ==
=== 1999: two-year-old season ===
On his racecourse debut, Holding Court finished sixth in a maiden race over seven furlongs on firm ground at Haydock Park Racecourse on 4 September. In his three remaining races of 1999 the colt was ridden by Frankie Dettori. On 30 September Holding Court started at odds of 12/1 for the Westley Maiden Stakes at Newmarket Racecourse and finished second of the fourteen runners, beaten a head by the favourite Qamous. Two weeks later, he started for a minor stakes race over heavy ground at Haydock and recorded his first win, leading from the start and beating Cover Up (later to win the Ascot Stakes, Queen Alexandra Stakes and Jockey Club Cup) by six lengths. On his final race of the season, Holding Court was moved up sharply in class for the Group One Racing Post Trophy at Doncaster Racecourse on 23 October. He started at odds of 13/2 but was never in serious contention and finished eighth of the nine runners behind the Aidan O'Brien-trained Aristotle.

=== 2000: three-year-old season ===
For the 2000 season, Holding court was transferred to the Newmarket stable of Michael Jarvis. Philip Robinson took over the ride and partnered the colt in all but one of his subsequent European races. On his first appearance of the season, the colt carried top weight of 133 pounds in a ten and a half furlong handicap race on heavy ground at Haydock in April. He led from the start and won by three and a half lengths. In the following month he was sent to France for the first time to contest the Group Three Prix La Force (a trial race for the Prix du Jockey Club) over 2400 metres and started 2.9/1 second favourite behind the previously unbeaten Bonnet Rouge. Ridden by the locally based Olivier Peslier he went to the front from the start and went clear in the straight to win by three lengths from the favourite, with a gap of two and a half lengths back to the other three runners.

On 4 June, Holding Court started at odds of 6.1/1 in a field of fourteen colts for 163rd running of the Prix du Jockey Club over 2400 metres on very soft ground at Chantilly Racecourse. The Hamdan Al Maktoum entry headed by the Prix Noailles winner Kutub started 2.1/1 favourite, whilst the other contenders included Ciro (Grand Critérium, Prix Lupin), Cosmographe (Prix l'Avre), Roscius (Predominate Stakes), Lord Flasheart (Prix de Condé, Prix Hocquart) and Millenary (Chester Vase). Robinson sent Holding Court into the lead from the start and was never seriously challenged. He drew away from the field in the straight and won by six lengths from Lord Flasheart, with Circus Dance taking third just ahead of Kutub, Broche and Ciro. He was the fourth British-trained colt to win the race in eleven years following Old Vic (1989), Sanglamore (1990) and Celtic Swing (1995). After the race Robinson said "He didn't just quicken once-he quickened twice. I knew it would take a good horse to get to me and I can't believe how far he's won" whilst Jarvis commented "He's such a galloper that he burns them off. He loves to bowl along, and when the rains came I thought the race looked ideal. When he won the Prix la Force his final fractions were those of a six-furlong horse. He's not just a stayer."

Four weeks later, Holding Court was matched against The Derby winner Sinndar in the Irish Derby after his owners paid a supplementary entry fee of IR£85,000. Before the race Robinson said that he would be "supremely confident" of beating the Derby winner on soft ground but only "hopeful" on good going. In the event, the race was run on a surface described as "yielding" – between good and soft. He started 9/4 second favourite behind his principal opponent, with the 2000 Guineas winner King's Best being the only other horse in the eleven runner field to start at odds of less than 16/1. He tracked the leaders and reached third place in the straight but made no further progress and eventually finished sixth, more than twelve lengths behind Sinndar. Two months later Holding Court was sent to Germany and matched against older horses for the first time in the Grosser Preis von Baden. He took the lead after 400 metres but faded in the straight and finished fifth behind the Deutsches Derby winner Samum. On his final start of the season, Holding Court was dropped in class for the Group Two Prix du Conseil de Paris at Longchamp in October. He began to struggle before half way and finished tailed-off last of the five runners behind Crimson Quest. Jarvis was reportedly "mystified" by the performance and requested a dope test.

=== 2001: four-year-old season ===
Holding Court began his third season in the Jockey Club Stakes at Newmarket on 4 May. He briefly took the lead three furlongs out before finishing third behind Millenary and Sandmason. In the Princess of Wales's Stakes two months later he led from the start but was overtaken a quarter of a mile from the finish and finished third behind Mutamam and Little Rock. On 26 August, Holding Court returned to France for the Group Two Grand Prix de Deauville over 2500 metres. He started the 5.3/1 fourth choice in the betting behind Epitre (Prix Hubert de Chaudenay), Maximum Security and Marienbard. Robinson send the horse into the lead as usual and took a five-length lead, which widened to an eight length advantage entering the straight. Marienbard steadily reduced the leaders advantage but could never get on terms and Holding Court won by two and a half lengths, with gaps of two, six and three lengths back to the next three finishers. In October, Holding Court contested France's most prestigious race, the Prix de l'Arc de Triomphe at Longchamp. He started a 23/1 outsider he was close to the leaders until the last 600 metres, but then faded to finish fifteenth of the seventeen runners behind Sakhee.

After his last race in Europe, Holding Court was sold and sent to race in Saudi Arabia where he finished fifth in the HRH Prince Abdullah bin Al Aziz Cup on dirt at Malaz Racecourse (Riyadh) in November and fourth in the Custodian of the Two Holy Mosques Cup in the following January.

== Stud record ==
After his retirement from racing, Holding Court stood as a breeding stallion in Saudi Arabia.

== Pedigree ==
Pedigree of Holding Court (GB), bay stallion, 1997
Sire Hernando (FR) 1990	Niniski (USA); 1976	Nijinsky	Northern Dancer
Sire Hernando (FR) 1990	Niniski (USA); 1976	Nijinsky	Flaming Page
Sire Hernando (FR) 1990	Niniski (USA); 1976	Virginia Hills	Tom Rolfe
Sire Hernando (FR) 1990	Niniski (USA); 1976	Virginia Hills	Ridin' Easy
Sire Hernando (FR) 1990	Whakilyric (USA); 1984	Miswaki	Mr. Prospector
Sire Hernando (FR) 1990	Whakilyric (USA); 1984	Miswaki	Hopespringseternal
Sire Hernando (FR) 1990	Whakilyric (USA); 1984	Lyrism	Lyphard
Sire Hernando (FR) 1990	Whakilyric (USA); 1984	Lyrism	Pass A Glance
Dam Indian Love Song (IRE) 1983	Be My Guest (USA); 1974	Northern Dancer	Nearctic
Dam Indian Love Song (IRE) 1983	Be My Guest (USA); 1974	Northern Dancer	Natalma
Dam Indian Love Song (IRE) 1983	Be My Guest (USA); 1974	What A Treat	Tudor Minstrel
Dam Indian Love Song (IRE) 1983	Be My Guest (USA); 1974	What A Treat	Rare Treat
Dam Indian Love Song (IRE) 1983	Indian Bird (GB); 1975	Relko	Tanerko
Dam Indian Love Song (IRE) 1983	Indian Bird (GB); 1975	Relko	Relance
Dam Indian Love Song (IRE) 1983	Indian Bird (GB); 1975	Maina	St. Paddy
Dam Indian Love Song (IRE) 1983	Indian Bird (GB); 1975	Maina	Indian Game (Family 22-d)

- Holding Court was inbred 3 x 4 to Northern Dancer, meaning that this stallion appears in both the third and fourth generation of his pedigree.
