= Soviet Star =

American-bred Thoroughbred racehorse

- Sire: Nureyev
- Grandsire: Northern Dancer
- Dam: Veruschka
- Damsire: Venture
- Sex: Stallion
- Foaled: 20 April 1984
- Country: United States
- Colour: Bay
- Breeder: Kinderhill Farm
- Owner: Sheikh Mohammed
- Trainer: André Fabre
- Record: 14: 8-4-0

Major wins
- Prix de Fontainebleau (1987); Poule d'Essai des Poulains (1987); Sussex Stakes (1987); Prix de la Forêt (1987); Forte Mile (1988); July Cup (1988); Prix du Moulin (1988)

Awards
- Timeform rating 128 (1987)

Soviet Star (20 April 1984 – 7 October 2014) was an American-bred French-trained Thoroughbred racehorse and sire. He was bred in Kentucky, sold as a yearling for $310,000 and sent to race in Europe where he proved to be an outstanding sprinter-miler, winning eight of his fourteen starts. After winning his only race as a two-year-old he became a top-class performer in 1987, winning the Prix de Fontainebleau on his debut and recording Group One victories in the Poule d'Essai des Poulains, Sussex Stakes and Prix de la Forêt. He remained in training as a four-year-old and added wins in the Forte Mile, July Cup and Prix du Moulin. He was retired to stud at the end of the year and had considerable success as a breeding stallion. He died in 2014 at the age of 30.

== Background ==
Soviet Star was a bay horse, standing 16 hands high, with a white star and snip bred in Kentucky by Kinderhill Farm. He was sired by Nureyev best known as a racehorse for being disqualified after beating Known Fact and Posse to "win" the 2000 Guineas in 1980. Apart from Soviet Star, Nureyev was the sire of the winners of at least forty-five Group One/Grade I including Peintre Celebre, Polar Falcon, Sonic Lady, Spinning World, Zilzal, Stravinsky and Miesque. Soviet Star's dam Veruschka produced several other winners, most notably the very successful American racemare The Very One.

As a yearling the colt was consigned to the November sale at Keeneland where he was bought for $310,000 by the British Bloodstock Agency, acting on behalf of Sheikh Mohammed. The colt was sent to Europe and was trained throughout his racing career by André Fabre in France.

== Racing career ==
=== 1986: two-year-old season ===
Soviet Star made his racecourse debut in a thirteen-runner maiden race over 1500 metres at Saint-Cloud Racecourse in October. He started favourite and won by one and a half lengths from Falcon Eye.

=== 1987: three-year-old season ===
Soviet Star began his three-year-old season with a win in the Listed Prix de Fontainebleau over 1600 metres at Longchamp Racecourse in April, ridden, as in all his races that year by Greville Starkey. On 10 May, over the same course and distance, the colt started favourite for the Group One Poule d'Essai des Poulains. His main rivals in the fourteen runner field appeared to be the European Free Handicap winner Noble Minstrel, Air de France, Saint Andrews (Prix Djebel) and Fotitieng (Prix des Chênes). After turning into the straight in sixth place he was switched to the outside and made rapid progress, taking the lead and winning by a length and a neck from Noble Minstrel and Glory Forever. After the race, Starkey reportedly described the winner as "another Dancing Brave". The colt was then stepped up in distance for the Prix Jean Prat over 1800 metres and started favourite, but after taking the lead in the straight he tired on the soft ground and was beaten half a length by the British-trained Risk Me.

Soviet Start was sent to England for his next two races, beginning with the St James's Palace Stakes at Royal Ascot on 16 June. He took second place in a five-runner field, beaten a length by the Luca Cumani-trained Half A Year, but finishing ahead of Risk Me, Don't Forget Me and Glory Forever. The Sussex Stakes at Goodwood Racecourse on 29 July saw Soviet Star take on older horses for the first time. The 4/6 favourite was the four-year-old Then Again, winner of the Lockinge Stakes and Queen Anne Stakes with Soviet Star next in the betting on 3/1. The other runners were Star Cutter (Premio Vittorio di Capua), Fair Judgment (Pacemaker International Stakes), Efisio (Emilio Turati), Hadeer (Hungerford Stakes) and Lauries Warrior (Diomed Stakes). Lauries Warrior took the early lead and set a very strong pace whilst Starkey restrained Soviet Star in sixth. Star Cutter went to the front in the straight but Soviet Star produced an impressive burst of acceleration to take the lead inside the final furlong and held of a renewed challenge from Star Cutter to win by half a length. Hadeer took third ahead of Then Again, who sustained an injury when slipping on the final turn.

On 6 September, Soviet Star returned to France for the Prix du Moulin over 1600 metres at Longchamp and started second favourite behind the outstanding three-year-old filly Miesque. He moved up to challenge the favourite in the straight, but the filly drew away in the closing stages and won by two and a half lengths. Soviet Star finished second ahead of Hadeer and Grecian Urn. In his final appearance of the year, Soviet Star was dropped back in distance for the Group One Prix de la Forêt over 1400 metres at Longchamp on 25 October. Racing on soft ground, he started favourite against thirteen opponents headed by the Irish sprinter Bluebird (King's Stand Stakes) the two-year-old Common Grounds (Prix de la Salamandre) and Grecian Urn. The other runners included Highest Honor (Prix d'Ispahan), Turkish Ruler (Prix du Palais-Royal), Glifahda (Prix de Seine-et-Oise), Grey Goddess (Matron Stakes), Balbonella (Prix Robert Papin), Tenue de Soiree (Prix du Gros Chêne), Sakura Reiko (Prix Morny) and Cricket Ball (Prix de Meautry). Soviet Star won decisively by a length from Highest Honor, with Turkish Ruler taking third in front of Balbonella.

=== 1988: four-year-old season ===
In 1988, Cash Asmussen took over from Starkey as Soviet Star's jockey. The colt began his third season in the Group Two Trusthouse Forte Mile at Sandown Park Racecourse and started 5/4 favourite ahead of the Michael Stoute-trained Ascot Knight. He was fourth of the six runners entering the straight before taking the lead a furlong out and won by two and a half lengths from Shady Heights.

At Royal Ascot in June, Soviet Star started odds-on favourite for the Queen Anne Stakes, but failed by a head to concede six pounds to the five-year-old Waajib, with Then Again a neck away in third. On 7 July Soviet Star was dropped back to sprinting for the July Cup at Newmarket Racecourse. The distance of six furlongs was the shortest he had attempted but he was nevertheless made 15/8 favourite in a nine-runner field. Cricket Ball and Glifahda were again in opposition, whilst his other rivals included Indian Ridge (King's Stand Stakes), Handsome Sailor (Temple Stakes), Gallic League (Middle Park Stakes), Big Shuffle (Cork and Orrery Stakes) and Governor General (Abernant Stakes). Asmussen held up the favourite towards the rear of the field as Governor General set the pace before Indian Ridge went to the front approaching the last quarter mile. Soviet Star took the lead a furlong out and was pushed out by Asmussen to win by two lengths from Big Shuffle with another two and a half lengths back to Handsome Sailor in third. At Deauville Racecourse in August, Soviet Star contested the Prix Jacques Le Marois and finished fourth behind Miesque, Warning and Gabina, beaten three lengths by the winner. It was the first time that he had finished worse than second.

In September, Soviet Star faced Miesque for the third time in the Prix du Moulin on soft ground at Longchamp, with Gabina and Blushing John also in opposition. The colt was held up by Asmussen as usual before turning into the straight in fourth place and then taking the lead 150 metres from the finish as Miesque also produced her challenge. Soviet Star and Miesque drew away from their opponents to fight out the finish with the colt prevailing by a head. The other runners finished strung out with gaps of four, five and eight lengths back to Gabina, Blushing John and Bluebook. On his final racecourse appearance, Soviet Star started 9/4 joint favourite for the Queen Elizabeth II Stakes at Ascot in October, but never looked likely to win and finished fourth, beaten eight lengths by Warning.

== Assessment ==
In their annual Racehorses of 1976, the independent Timeform organisation did not give Soviet Star a rating but described him as being "sure to go on to better things". In the following year he was rated 128 by Timeform, placing him placing him eleven pounds behind their Horse of the Year Reference Point. In the International Classification for 1987 he was given a rating of 125, making him the sixth-best colt of his generation in Europe behind Reference Point, Trempolino, Entitled, Ajdal and Half A Year.

The Racing Post's Tony Morris described Soviet Star as "highly strung" but raced game and consistent.

== Stud record ==
Soviet Star was retired from racing to become a breeding stallion at Sheikh Mohammed's Dalham Hall in Newmarket. He was transferred to Japan in 1994, and was shuttled to New Zealand in 1999, before moving to Ireland in 2000 where he stood at the Ballylinch Stud, County Kilkenny. He lived out his last years in semi-retirement with his companion, Bertie the goat and died in his paddock at Ballylinch in October 2014 at age 30. Ballylinch's managing director John O'Connor said "He was a lovely, kind horse and it was a privilege to have had him here at the stud".

The best of his offspring included Freedom Cry (runner-up in the Prix de l'Arc de Triomphe), Starcraft, Starborough, Ashkalani (Prix du Moulin), Soviet Line (Lockinge Stakes), Pressing (Premio Roma), Russian Pearl (Bayer Classic), Limpid (Grand Prix de Paris), Boris de Deauville (Prix d'Harcourt), Buccellati (Ormonde Stakes), Democratic Deficit (Craven Stakes), Eva's Request (Premio Lydia Tesio) and the steeplechaser Tiutchev.

== Pedigree ==
Pedigree of Soviet Star (USA), bay stallion, 1984
Sire Nureyev (USA) 1977	Northern Dancer (CAN); 1961	Nearctic	Nearco
Sire Nureyev (USA) 1977	Northern Dancer (CAN); 1961	Nearctic	Lady Angela
Sire Nureyev (USA) 1977	Northern Dancer (CAN); 1961	Natalma	Native Dancer
Sire Nureyev (USA) 1977	Northern Dancer (CAN); 1961	Natalma	Almahmoud
Sire Nureyev (USA) 1977	Special (USA); 1969	Forli	Aristophanes
Sire Nureyev (USA) 1977	Special (USA); 1969	Forli	Trevisa
Sire Nureyev (USA) 1977	Special (USA); 1969	Thong	Nantallah
Sire Nureyev (USA) 1977	Special (USA); 1969	Thong	Rough Shod
Dam Veruschka (FR) 1967	Venture (GB); 1957	Relic	War Relic
Dam Veruschka (FR) 1967	Venture (GB); 1957	Relic	Bridal Colors
Dam Veruschka (FR) 1967	Venture (GB); 1957	Rose O'Lynn	Pherozshah
Dam Veruschka (FR) 1967	Venture (GB); 1957	Rose O'Lynn	Rocklyn
Dam Veruschka (FR) 1967	Marie d'Anjou (FR); 1954	Vandale	Plassy
Dam Veruschka (FR) 1967	Marie d'Anjou (FR); 1954	Vandale	Vanille
Dam Veruschka (FR) 1967	Marie d'Anjou (FR); 1954	Marigold	Panipat
Dam Veruschka (FR) 1967	Marie d'Anjou (FR); 1954	Marigold	Theodora (Family: 9-f)
