= Ballingarry (horse) =

Irish-bred Thoroughbred racehorse

- Sire: Sadler's Wells
- Grandsire: Northern Dancer
- Dam: Flamenco Wave
- Damsire: Desert Wine
- Sex: Stallion
- Foaled: 1999
- Country: Ireland
- Colour: Bay
- Breeder: Orpendale
- Owner: 1) Susan Magnier; 2) Sidney L. Port, Martha Naify, San Gabriel Investments
- Trainer: 1) Aidan O'Brien; 2) Laura de Seroux (at 4)
- Record: 22: 6-1-6
- Earnings: US$1,736,049 (equivalent)

Major wins
- Critérium de Saint-Cloud (2001); Prix Noailles (2002); Canadian International Stakes (2002); Stars and Stripes Breeders' Cup Turf Handicap (2003, 2004)

Ballingarry (13 April 1999 – 16 April 2020) was a Thoroughbred racehorse who competed for owners in Europe and North America. Bred and raced by the principals of Coolmore Stud, he was named for the village of Ballingarry in the southern part of County Tipperary in Ireland. In October 2002, he was sold to an American racing partnership led by Sidney L. Port.

Ballingarry's most important wins came at age two in the Group One Critérium de Saint-Cloud at Saint-Cloud Racecourse in France and at age three in the Grade 1 Canadian International Stakes at Woodbine Racetrack in Toronto. Following his purchase by Sidney Port, Ballingarry notably won back-to-back editions of the Stars and Stripes Breeders' Cup Turf Handicap at Chicago's Arlington Park.

Retired to stud duty, since 2005 Ballingarry has been standing at Charles-Henri de Moussac's Haras du Mezeray in Ticheville, Lower Normandy, France. Died on 16 April 2020.

== Pedigree ==
Pedigree of Ballingarry
Sire Sadler's Wells 1981	Northern Dancer 1961	Nearctic	Nearco
Sire Sadler's Wells 1981	Northern Dancer 1961	Nearctic	Lady Angela
Sire Sadler's Wells 1981	Northern Dancer 1961	Natalma	Native Dancer
Sire Sadler's Wells 1981	Northern Dancer 1961	Natalma	Almahmoud
Sire Sadler's Wells 1981	Fairy Bridge 1975	Bold Reason	Hail To Reason
Sire Sadler's Wells 1981	Fairy Bridge 1975	Bold Reason	Lalun
Sire Sadler's Wells 1981	Fairy Bridge 1975	Special	Forli
Sire Sadler's Wells 1981	Fairy Bridge 1975	Special	Thong
Dam Flamenco Wave 1986	Desert Wine 1980	Damascus	Sword Dancer
Dam Flamenco Wave 1986	Desert Wine 1980	Damascus	Kerala
Dam Flamenco Wave 1986	Desert Wine 1980	Anne Campbell	Never Bend
Dam Flamenco Wave 1986	Desert Wine 1980	Anne Campbell	Repercussion
Dam Flamenco Wave 1986	Armada Way 1976	Sadair	Petare
Dam Flamenco Wave 1986	Armada Way 1976	Sadair	Blue Missy
Dam Flamenco Wave 1986	Armada Way 1976	Hurry Call	Nasrullah
Dam Flamenco Wave 1986	Armada Way 1976	Hurry Call	Fleet Flight
