= Desert Wine =

American-bred Thoroughbred racehorse

- Sire: Damascus
- Grandsire: Sword Dancer
- Dam: Anne Campbell
- Damsire: Never Bend
- Sex: Stallion
- Foaled: 1980
- Country: United States
- Colour: Bay
- Breeder: Brereton C. Jones & Warnerton Farms
- Owner: Dan Agnew's T90 Ranch
- Trainer: Jerry M. Fanning
- Record: 25: 8-8-3
- Earnings: $1,618,043

Major wins
- Hollywood Juvenile Champion.Stakes (1982); Sunny Slope Stakes (1982); San Rafael Stakes (1983); San Felipe Stakes (1983); Californian Stakes (1984); Strub Stakes (1984); Hollywood Gold Cup (1984) American Classic Race placings: Kentucky Derby 2nd (1983); Preakness Stakes 2nd (1983)
- Last updated on May 16, 2007

Desert Wine (1980–2003) was an American Thoroughbred racehorse best known for his three-year-old season that included a runner-up finish in the Preakness Stakes and four stakes wins in California, including the Strub Stakes.

== Background ==
A descendant of Nearco, he was sired by U.S. Hall of Fame inductee Damascus, himself the son of another Hall of Fame horse, Sword Dancer. He was bred by Brereton C. Jones out of the mare Anne Campbell, whose sire was Never Bend.

== Two-year-old season ==
At age two, Desert Wine won the grade two Hollywood Juvenile Championship Stakes at six furlongs and the grade three Sunny Slope Stakes during the Oak Tree at Santa Anita meet. He also placed second in the grade one Norfolk Stakes at a mile and one sixteenth at Santa Anita and won the grade one Del Mar Futurity and the grade two Hollywood Futurity while placing third in the Hollywood Prevue Stakes.

== Three-year-old season ==
Desert Wine started his three-year-old season at Santa Anita Park in the winter of 1983. In February, he won the grade two San Felipe Stakes at one mile and one sixteenth under jockey Chris McCarron at Santa Anita. In March, Desert Wine won the grade three San Rafael Stakes at one mile at Santa Anita, guided again by jockey Chris McCarron. Then Desert Wine ran second in the 1983 Kentucky Derby.

== Preakness Stakes ==
After the Derby, trainer Jerry M. Fanning entered Desert Wine in the second jewel of the American Triple Crown in the $250,000 grade one Preakness Stakes. He was listed as 4-1 second choice behind Derby winner Sunny's Halo. Desert Wine broke second in the field of twelve colts on a muddy track. He had speed from the start, and Chris McCarron used it to take the lead going into Pimlico's famous "Clubhouse turn." Despite the off track, Desert Wine set fast early fractions of :23-1/5 for the first quarter and :46-4/5 for the half mile.

He led by one and a half lengths down the backstretch and around the final turn. At the top of the lane, 15-1 longshot Deputed Testamony slipped by on the rail and pulled away from the field. The Maryland bred won by 2-3/4 lengths while Desert Wine finished over four lengths ahead of the show horse, High Honors. Desert Wine took home 20% of the purse that day, equalling $50,000.

== Later career ==
However, he is probably best remembered for the 1984 Hollywood Gold Cup when Chris McCarron rode him to victory over the great John Henry.

Desert Wine died of a heart attack at age twenty-three on October 15, 2003, at St. Hilaire Farm near Yakima, Washington, owned by Gary L. and Christine Jackson, where he had stood at stud since 2000. His progeny included Flamenco Wave, a successful racemare in Europe who produced three Group One winners as well as the dam of St Nicholas Abbey.

- Desert Wine's pedigree and partial racing stats
- Desert Wine's offspring at the Triple Crown database by Kathleen Irwin and Joy Reeves
