= Creative Force =

Irish-bred Thoroughbred racehorse (2018–2023)

- Racing silks of Godolphin
- Sire: Dubawi
- Grandsire: Dubai Millennium
- Dam: Choose Me
- Damsire: Choisir
- Sex: Gelding
- Foaled: 30 March 2018
- Died: 17 May 2023 (aged 5)
- Country: Ireland
- Colour: Chestnut
- Breeder: Owenstown Bloodstock
- Owner: Godolphin
- Trainer: Charlie Appleby
- Record: 10: 6-1-0
- Earnings: £393,449

Major wins
- Carnarvon Stakes (2021); Jersey Stakes (2021); British Champions Sprint Stakes (2021)

Creative Force (30 March 2018 – 17 May 2023) was an Irish-bred, British-trained Thoroughbred racehorse. After winning one of his two starts as a juvenile in 2020 he was gelded. In the following year he improved to become one of the best sprinters in Europe, winning five races including the Carnarvon Stakes, Jersey Stakes and British Champions Sprint Stakes.

Creative Force died after sustaining a fatal injury during the Duke of York Stakes on 17 May 2023, at the age of 5.

== Background ==
Creative Force was a chestnut horse with a white blaze bred in Ireland by the County Kildare-based Owenstown Stud. In October 2019 the yearling was consigned to the Goffs Orby sale and was bought for €400,000 by representatives of Godolphin.

Creative Force was from the twelfth crop of foals sired by Dubawi, whose wins included the Irish 2,000 Guineas and the Prix Jacques Le Marois. At stud, Dubawi has been a highly successful breeding stallion, siring major winners such as Ghaiyyath, Too Darn Hot, Al Kazeem, Makfi, Old Persian, Lucky Nine and Night of Thunder. Creative Force's dam Choose Me was a durable racemare who won four of her 28 starts including a valuable sales race at the Curragh and the Listed Fairy Bridge Stakes at Tipperary Racecourse. As a broodmare she also produced Persuasive, the Coral Distaff winner Tisbutadream and the successful sprint handicapper Amazour. Choose Me was a great-granddaughter of the outstanding Irish racemare Cairn Rouge.

== Racing career ==
=== 2020: two-year-old season ===
Creative Force was ridden in both of his races as a two-year-old by William Buick. The colt began his racing in a maiden race over six furlongs on good to firm ground at Newmarket Racecourse on 4 June and started at odds of 7/2 in an eleven-runner field. He took the lead soon after the start and won "comfortably" by one and a quarter lengths from Imperial Force. Sixteen days later Creative Force was stepped up in class for the Group 2 Coventry Stakes at Royal Ascot. Starting at odds of 10/1 he took the lead two furlongs out and appeared to be going well but tired in the final furlong and came home tenth behind the 150/1 outsider Nando Parrado. Creative Force did not race again in 2020 and was gelded in the autumn.

=== 2021: three-year-old season ===
Creative Force began his second campaign in handicap races and was partnered by Buick in his first two starts. At Nemarket on 15 April he was assigned a weight of 127 pounds for a six-furlong contest and won "going away" by one and three quarter lengths from Significantly after coming from off the pace to gain the advantage in the last 110 yards. Just over two weeks later, over the same course and distance, he carried 133 pounds to victory in a similar event, beating Perotto by a length after going off the 4/5 favourite. James Doyle took the ride when Creative Force was moved up to Listed level for the Carnarvon Stakes at Newbury Racecourse on 15 May and started 9/4 second favourite behind the European Free Handicap winner Tactical. After tracking the leaders he went to the front approaching the final furlong and drew away in the closing stages to win "comfortably" by three lengths. Charlie Appleby commented "He's a fun little horse to have around at the moment. Who knows, if he hadn't been gelded he might not be doing what he's doing now. He's there to be a racehorse and that's what he's doing now. When these sprinters get on a roll you don't know when they'll plateau out. Thankfully he's on an upward curve."

On 19 June Creative Force ran for the second time at Royal Ascot and was moved up in class and distance for the Group 3 Jersey Stakes over seven furlongs on soft ground. Ridden by Doyle, he started 5/1 joint favourite alongside his stablemate Naval Crown, who was partnered by Buick. The eighteen runners split into two groups across the wide, straight course, with Creative Force settling towards the rear of those racing down the centre of the track before making progress in the last quarter mile. He gained the advantage from Naval Crown, who was racing up the stands side, inside the final furlong and kept on well to win by one and a quarter lengths. Appleby said "We were hopeful on Creative Force's pedigree and what he has shown us at home in his attitude... that stepping up to seven furlongs would be within his realm, and he's gone and duly obliged today. James has given him a lovely ride. He knew he had to sit a bit patient on him stepping up over this trip and on this ground, and as James said on his way in, he is a very brave horse."

Creative Force was then matched against older horses in the Group 1 July Cup at Newmarket on 10 July when he started at odds of 5/1 and finished fifth behind Starman, Dragon Symbol, Oxted and Art Power, beaten two lengths by the winner. Later that month he went off favourite for the Group 2 Lennox Stakes over seven furlongs at Goodwood Racecourse but was beaten a neck into second place by the four-year-old Kinross. In the Sprint Cup at Haydock Park on 4 September he stumbled exiting the starting stalls and despite staying on well in the closing stages and came home sixth behind the five-year-old gelding Emaraaty Ana.

On 16 October, with Buick in the saddle, Creative Force contested the Group 1 British Champions Sprint Stakes over six furlongs on good to soft ground at Ascot and started the 11/2 third choice in the betting behind Art Power and the Wokingham Stakes winner Rohaan. The other seventeen runners included Dragon Symbol, Kinross, Nando Parrado, Glen Shiel, Thunder Moon and Brando (Prix Maurice de Gheest). Creative Force tracked the front-running Glen Shiel before gaining the advantage a furlong out and kept on well to win by a length. Charlie Appleby said "At this level of sprinting it's such a tough game you can't have anything not go right. Coming along this season I felt this horse was getting the knack of sprinting... We knew Glen Shiel was the right horse to follow and as he's won over further here we knew he was going to hit the line hard. If anything was going to come from behind us and beat us then fair play to them, but they didn't."

== Pedigree ==
Pedigree of Creative Force (IRE), chestnut gelding, 2018
Sire Dubawi (IRE) 2002	Dubai Millennium (GB); 1996	Seeking the Gold (USA)	Mr. Prospector
Sire Dubawi (IRE) 2002	Dubai Millennium (GB); 1996	Seeking the Gold (USA)	Con Game
Sire Dubawi (IRE) 2002	Dubai Millennium (GB); 1996	Colorado Dancer (IRE)	Shareef Dancer (USA)
Sire Dubawi (IRE) 2002	Dubai Millennium (GB); 1996	Colorado Dancer (IRE)	Fall Aspen (USA)
Sire Dubawi (IRE) 2002	Zomaradah (GB); 1995	Deploy	Shirley Heights
Sire Dubawi (IRE) 2002	Zomaradah (GB); 1995	Deploy	Slightly Dangerous (USA)
Sire Dubawi (IRE) 2002	Zomaradah (GB); 1995	Jawaher (IRE)	Dancing Brave (USA)
Sire Dubawi (IRE) 2002	Zomaradah (GB); 1995	Jawaher (IRE)	High Tern
Dam Choose Me (IRE) 2006	Choisir (AUS); 1999	Danehill Dancer (IRE)	Danehill (USA)
Dam Choose Me (IRE) 2006	Choisir (AUS); 1999	Danehill Dancer (IRE)	Mira Adonde (USA)
Dam Choose Me (IRE) 2006	Choisir (AUS); 1999	Great Selection	Lunchtime (GB)
Dam Choose Me (IRE) 2006	Choisir (AUS); 1999	Great Selection	Pensive Mood
Dam Choose Me (IRE) 2006	Hecuba (GB); 2000	Hector Protector (USA)	Woodman
Dam Choose Me (IRE) 2006	Hecuba (GB); 2000	Hector Protector (USA)	Korveya
Dam Choose Me (IRE) 2006	Hecuba (GB); 2000	Ajuga (USA)	The Minstrel (CAN)
Dam Choose Me (IRE) 2006	Hecuba (GB); 2000	Ajuga (USA)	Cairn Rouge (IRE) (Family: 1-l)
