= Albigna =

Irish-bred racehorse

- Racing silks of Niarchos Family
- Sire: Zoffany
- Grandsire: Dansili
- Dam: Freedonia
- Damsire: Selkirk
- Sex: Mare
- Foaled: 20 March 2017
- Country: Ireland
- Colour: Chestnut
- Breeder: Niarchos Family
- Owner: Niarchos Family
- Trainer: Jessica Harrington
- Record: 9: 3-1-0
- Earnings: £343,489

Major wins
- Airlie Stud Stakes (2019); Prix Marcel Boussac (2019)

Albigna (foaled 20 March 2017) is an Irish Thoroughbred racehorse. She was one of the best European juvenile fillies of 2019 when she won three of her five races. She won a maiden race on her debut and then stepped up in class to win the Airlie Stud Stakes. After running poorly in the Moyglare Stud Stakes she returned to form to take the Prix Marcel Boussac. On her final run of the year she finished fourth in the Breeders' Cup Juvenile Fillies Turf.

== Background ==
Albigna is a chestnut mare with white blaze bred in Ireland by her owners the Niarchos Family. She was sent into training with Jessica Harrington at Moone, in County Kildare. She was ridden in all of her races by Shane Foley.

She was from the fifth crop of foals sired by Zoffany, who won the Phoenix Stakes as a two-year-old but produced his best effort when running a close second to Frankel in the St James's Palace Stakes. His other foals have included Ventura Storm (Gran Premio del Jockey Club), Washington DC (Windsor Castle Stakes) and Fleeting (May Hill Stakes).

Albigna's dam Freedonia showed top class racing ability, winning three races including the Prix de Pomone as well as finishing second to English Channel in the Joe Hirsch Turf Classic Invitational Stakes. Freedonia's dam Forest Rain was a half-sister to Domedriver and as a great-granddaughter of the American broodmare Sex Appeal (foaled 1970) was closely related to El Gran Senor and Try My Best.

== Racing career ==
=== 2019: two-year-old season ===
On her racecourse debut Albigna started at odds of 10/1 in a maiden race over six furlongs at the Curragh on 24 May. After settling in seventh pace she made rapid progress in the final furlong, caught the Aidan O'Brien-trained favourite Tango in the last strides and won by a head with another O'Brien trainee Precious Moments in third. The filly was stepped up in class for the Group 2 Airlie Stud Stakes over the same course and distance on 28 June and went off the 5/2 favourite against nine opponents including Tango, Precious Moments, Ickworth (winner of the Listed First Flier Stakes) and Peace Charter (runner-up in the Fillies' Sprint Stakes). She had not been among the original entries for the race and was only added to the field four days earlier on the payment of a supplementary entry fee. Albigna raced towards the rear of the field before making progress under pressure in the last quarter mile. She was still only fifth a furlong out but maintained her run, overtook Precious Moments near the finish and won by half a length. After the race Jessica Harrington said "She got there in the end. Shane said she was outpaced throughout the race and she'd never been so fast in her life but when she got going she was good. Her class got her there. I thought she was going to be nowhere but then suddenly she took off. It's very bad for my heart!... She'll definitely step up to seven, she's not going to go six again, and even at the end of the year she might go a mile. She's in the Moyglare... I took the punt on Monday and supplemented her... It was money very well spent and it's great when it works."

As Harrington had hinted, Albigna was moved up in class and distance to contest the Group 1 Moyglare Stud Stakes at the Curragh on 15 September and started the 9/4 second choice in the betting behind the British-trained Daahyeh (winner of the Albany Stakes). She tracked the leaders for most of the way but was unable to make any progress in the closing stages and finished sixth of the nine runners behind Love. After the race she was found to be in season which Harrington believed had affected her performance. For her next start the filly was sent to France for the Group 1 Prix Marcel Boussac over 1400 metres on very soft ground at Longchamp Racecourse. The Prix d'Aumale winner Savarin started favourite ahead of the Listed winner Plegastell with Albigna next in the betting on 4.2/1 alongside Bionic Woman. Albigna raced in sixth or seventh place for most of the way as Marieta set the pace, and moved up on the outside to take second place entering the last 200 metres. She overtook Marieta inside the last 100 metres and drew away to win by two and a half lengths. After the race Harrington commented "Zoffany horses tend to go on a bit of soft ground, but we just didn't know. She had never run on it... today we saw the real Albigna, the filly we've seen at home. I didn't think she was traveling great, but Shane said she likes to find her feet, just as she had done in her first two races". When asked to compare the filly to her stablemate Millisle she added "They've never worked together, but this filly has showed she stays a mile, so she looks more like a classic filly".

On her final run of 2019 Albigna was sent to California for the Breeders' Cup Juvenile Fillies Turf on firm ground at Santa Anita Park on 1 November. She was restrained at the rear of the field before making steady progress in the last quarter mile but was never able to challenge the leaders and came home fourth behind Sharing, Daahyeh and Sweet Melania.

In the official rating of European two-year-olds for 2019 Albigna was rated the second-best filly of the year, one pound behind Millisle and level with Quadrilateral and Raffle Prize.

=== 2020: three-year-old season ===
The flat racing season in Ireland was disrupted by the COVID-19 pandemic and the Irish 1000 Guineas was run three weeks later than usual on 13 June behind closed doors at the Curragh. Albigna started the 6/5 favourite in an eleven-runner field but never looked likely to win and finished sixth, four and a half lengths behind the winner Peaceful. She sweated up before the race and Foley reported that the filly had been unsuited by the good-to-firm ground. She was then dropped in class for the Group 3 Snow Fairy Stakes at the Curragh in August when she started favourite but was beaten into second place by Thundering Nights. In the Matron Stakes in September she came home fourth of the eleven runners behind Champers Elysees, beaten four and a half lengths by the winner. On her final start of the year she started favourite for the Group 3 Concorde Stakes over seven and a half furlongs at Tipperary Racecourse on 3 October but made little impact and finished seventh behind the four-year-old gelding Current Option.

== Pedigree ==
Pedigree of Albigna (IRE), chestnut filly 2017
Sire Zoffany (IRE) 2008	Dansili; 1996	Danehill (USA)	Danzig
Sire Zoffany (IRE) 2008	Dansili; 1996	Danehill (USA)	Razyana
Sire Zoffany (IRE) 2008	Dansili; 1996	Hasili (IRE)	Kahyasi
Sire Zoffany (IRE) 2008	Dansili; 1996	Hasili (IRE)	Kerali (GB)
Sire Zoffany (IRE) 2008	Tyranny (GB); 2000	Machiavellian (USA)	Mr. Prospector
Sire Zoffany (IRE) 2008	Tyranny (GB); 2000	Machiavellian (USA)	Coup de Folie
Sire Zoffany (IRE) 2008	Tyranny (GB); 2000	Dust Dancer	Suave Dancer (USA)
Sire Zoffany (IRE) 2008	Tyranny (GB); 2000	Dust Dancer	Galaxie Dust (USA)
Dam Freedonia (GB) 2002	Selkirk (USA); 1988	Sharpen Up (GB)	Atan (USA)
Dam Freedonia (GB) 2002	Selkirk (USA); 1988	Sharpen Up (GB)	Rocchetta
Dam Freedonia (GB) 2002	Selkirk (USA); 1988	Annie Edge (IRE)	Nebbiolo (GB)
Dam Freedonia (GB) 2002	Selkirk (USA); 1988	Annie Edge (IRE)	Friendly Court
Dam Freedonia (GB) 2002	Forest Rain (FR); 1997	Caerleon (USA)	Nijinsky (CAN)
Dam Freedonia (GB) 2002	Forest Rain (FR); 1997	Caerleon (USA)	Foreseer
Dam Freedonia (GB) 2002	Forest Rain (FR); 1997	Napoli (GB)	Baillamont (USA)
Dam Freedonia (GB) 2002	Forest Rain (FR); 1997	Napoli (GB)	Bella Senora (USA) (Family: 8-f)
