= Peaceful =

Peaceful indicates a state of, or inclination for, peace.

Peaceful may also refer to:

- Peaceful (film), a 2021 French drama
- Peaceful (horse), a racehorse
- "Peaceful" (song), by Kenny Rankin
