= Pertemps =

Pertemps may refer to:

- Pertemps Network Group, a recruitment business in the United Kingdom
- Pertemps Final, a horse race in the United Kingdom
- Birmingham & Solihull R.F.C., formerly the Pertemps Bees
- Swinton Handicap Hurdle, also known as Pertemps Network Handicap Hurdle, a horse race in the United Kingdom
