= 2024 Epsom Derby =

245th running of the Epsom Derby horse race

- Epsom Derby
- Location: Epsom Downs Racecourse
- Date: 1 June 2024
- Winning horse: City Of Troy
- Starting price: 3-1
- Jockey: Ryan Moore
- Trainer: Aidan O'Brien
- Owner: Sue Magnier, Michael Tabor, Derrick Smith
- Conditions: Good to soft

Epsom Derby 2024
1-2-3
City Of Troy	Ambiente Friendly	Los Angeles

Also Ran
4-5-6
Deira Mile	Sayedaty Sadaty	Dancing Gemini
7-8-9
Bellum Justum	Ancient Wisdom	Euphoric
10-11-12
Tabletalk	Kamboo	God's Window
13-14-15
Macduff	Dallas Star	Mr Hampstead
Unseated Rider
Voyage	16 Ran

The 2024 Epsom Derby was the 245th annual running of the Derby horse race and took place at Epsom Downs Racecourse on 1 June 2024 at 4.30pm BST. The race was sponsored for the first time by the bookmaker Betfred. The purse for 2024 was £1.5 million, with £850,650 in prize money for the winner.

The race was broadcast live by ITV1, on subscription service Racing TV and by 34 international broadcasters.

The winner was bay colt City Of Troy, sired by Justify out of Together Forever, ridden by Ryan Moore and trained by Aidan O'Brien, the most successful Epsom Derby trainer of all time with 10 wins.

== Result ==
1st - City of Troy - 3-1

2nd - Ambiente Friendly - 9-2

3rd - Los Angeles - 6-1

4th - Deira Mile - 25-1

== Form analysis ==
=== Subsequent Group 1 wins ===
- City of Troy – Eclipse Stakes, Juddmonte International (2024)
- Los Angeles - Irish Derby (2024), Tattersalls Gold Cup (2025)
