= Champers Elysees =

Irish Thoroughbred racehorse

- Racing silks of Fitzwilliam Racing
- Sire: Elzaam
- Grandsire: Redoute's Choice
- Dam: La Cuvee
- Damsire: Mark of Esteem
- Sex: Filly
- Foaled: 20 March 2017
- Country: Ireland
- Colour: Bay
- Breeder: Karl Bowen
- Owner: Fitzwilliam Racing
- Trainer: Johnny Murtagh
- Record: 10: 5-2-1
- Earnings: £233,481

Major wins
- Corrib Fillies Stakes (2020); Fairy Bridge Stakes (2020); Matron Stakes (2020)

Champers Elysees (foaled 20 March 2017) is an Irish Thoroughbred racehorse. She showed modest racing ability as a juvenile in 2019 when she won one minor race from five attempts. In the following year she made rapid progress, winning her first four races including the Corrib Fillies Stakes, Fairy Bridge Stakes and Matron Stakes.

== Background ==
Champers Elysees is a bay filly with a white blaze and three white socks bred in Ireland by Karl Bowen. As a foal in November 2017 she was put up for auction at the Tattersalls Ireland Fairyhouse Foal and Breeding Stock Sale and was bought for €12,500 by Aughamore Stud. In the following year she returned to the Tattersalls sales ring and was bought for €28,000 by Johnny Murtagh. She was again offered for sale in early 2019 but failed to reach her reserve price. She entered the ownership of Fitzwilliam Racing and was trained during her racing career by Murtagh at Collaghknock Glebe, County Kildare.

She was sired by Elzaam, an Australian-bred stallion who recorded his biggest win in the Listed Carnarvon Stakes in 2011. Champers Elysees' dam La Cuvee showed no racing ability, failing to win or place in seven starts, but was a daughter of the high-class sprinter Premier Cuvee who won the Goldene Peitsche in 1986. Premier Cuvee was a great-granddaughter of the French broodmare Vareta (foaled 1953) whose other descendants have included Ashkalani, Dick Turpin and Zalaiyka.

== Racing career ==
=== 2019: two-year-old season ===
Champers Elysees was ridden by Conor Hoban when she made her racecourse debut in a maiden race over seven furlongs at the Curragh on 16 August 2019 when she started a 40/1 outsider and finished third of the twenty-nine runners. In a similar event on heavy ground at Roscommon Racecourse sixteen days later she ran second to Helvic Dream, beaten four and three quarter lengths by the winner. On 15 September at the Curragh she came home sixth behind Stone Circle in the Tattersalls Ireland Super Auction Sale Stakes. Two weeks later she started second favourite for a minor race over six furlongs at the Curragh in which she was ridden, as in her last two starts, by Shane Foley. Racing on heavy ground she was towards the rear of the field for most of the way before finishing strongly to win by three quarters of length from the colt Johan Zoffani. The filly ended her first season by finishing second to For The Trees in a handicap race for juveniles at Naas Racecourse on 20 October.

=== 2020: three-year-old season ===
The 2020 flat racing season in Ireland was disrupted by the COVID-19 pandemic and Champers Elysees did not reappear until 12 June when she started at odds of 14/1 for a seven furlong maiden at the Curragh. Ridden by the apprentice jockey Danny Sheehy she took the lead a furlong and a half from the finish and kept on well to win by half a length from Bright Idea. Ben Coen took the ride when the filly was stepped up in class to contest the Listed Corrib Fillies Stakes over seven furlongs at Galway Races on 28 July and went off the 15/8 favourite in a twelve-runner field. After tracking the leaders she went to the front on the final turn and drew away in the straight to win "easily" by seven lengths. On 2 September at Gowran Park Champers Elysees was moved up in grade again and started 5/6 favourite against ten opponents for the Group 3 Fairy Bridge Stakes. The race had been originally scheduled to be run a week earlier at Tipperary but the meeting was abandoned as the course was waterlogged. With the veteran Niall McCullagh in the saddle, she settled behind the leaders before taking the lead approaching the final furlong and winning by half a lengths from Pearls Galore. Johnny Murtagh commented "I was so sick last week when Tipperary was called off, but thankfully the race was rescheduled to here, and I thought the track would suit her well. She really improved from Galway, and had a better prep coming into this race... she's tough and hardy".

Ten days after her win at Gowran Park Champers Elysees was moved to the highest class for the Group 1 Matron Stakes over one mile at Leopardstown Racecourse in which she was ridden by Colin Keane and went off at odds of 9/2. Fancy Blue started favourite while the other contenders included Peaceful, Albigna, Know It All (Derrinstown Stud Fillies Stakes) and Valeria Messalina (Brownstown Stakes). Champers Elysees was restrained before beginning to make rapid progress in the last quarter mile. She overtook Peaceful inside the final furlong and won by one and a quarter lengths. After the race Murtagh said "It's been a brilliant year but to win a Group 1 on Champions Weekend, it means everything. That's what we get up in the morning for; we want to be here on this stage. Races like the Sun Chariot Stakes and the Breeders' Cup Mile will have to be considered for her now. I'm a very good trainer, I just need better horses".

On 3 October Champers Elysees was sent to England to contest the Group 1 Sun Chariot Stakes at Newmarket Racecourse and started the 11/4 favourite in an eleven-runner field. She struggled to obtain a clear run in the last quarter mile before keeping on to finish fourth behind Nazeef, Half Light and Cloak of Spirits.

== Pedigree ==
Pedigree of Champers Elysees (IRE), bay filly, 2017
Sire Elzaam (AUS) 2008	Redoute's Choice (AUS); 1996	Danehill (USA)	Danzig
Sire Elzaam (AUS) 2008	Redoute's Choice (AUS); 1996	Danehill (USA)	Razyana
Sire Elzaam (AUS) 2008	Redoute's Choice (AUS); 1996	Shantha's Choice	Canny Lad
Sire Elzaam (AUS) 2008	Redoute's Choice (AUS); 1996	Shantha's Choice	Dancing Show (USA)
Sire Elzaam (AUS) 2008	Mambo In Freeport (USA); 1999	Kingmambo	Mr. Prospector
Sire Elzaam (AUS) 2008	Mambo In Freeport (USA); 1999	Kingmambo	Miesque
Sire Elzaam (AUS) 2008	Mambo In Freeport (USA); 1999	Golden Thatch	Slew o' Gold
Sire Elzaam (AUS) 2008	Mambo In Freeport (USA); 1999	Golden Thatch	Free Port
Dam La Cuvee (GB) 2004	Mark of Esteem (IRE); 1993	Darshaan (GB)	Shirley Heights
Dam La Cuvee (GB) 2004	Mark of Esteem (IRE); 1993	Darshaan (GB)	Delsy (FR)
Dam La Cuvee (GB) 2004	Mark of Esteem (IRE); 1993	Homage (GB)	Ajdal (USA)
Dam La Cuvee (GB) 2004	Mark of Esteem (IRE); 1993	Homage (GB)	Home Love (USA)
Dam La Cuvee (GB) 2004	Premiere Cuvee (GB); 1982	Formidable (USA)	Forli (ARG)
Dam La Cuvee (GB) 2004	Premiere Cuvee (GB); 1982	Formidable (USA)	Native Partner
Dam La Cuvee (GB) 2004	Premiere Cuvee (GB); 1982	Clicquot	Bold Lad (IRE)
Dam La Cuvee (GB) 2004	Premiere Cuvee (GB); 1982	Clicquot	Effervescence (Family: 11-g)
