= Intersky Falcon =

British-bred Thoroughbred racehorse

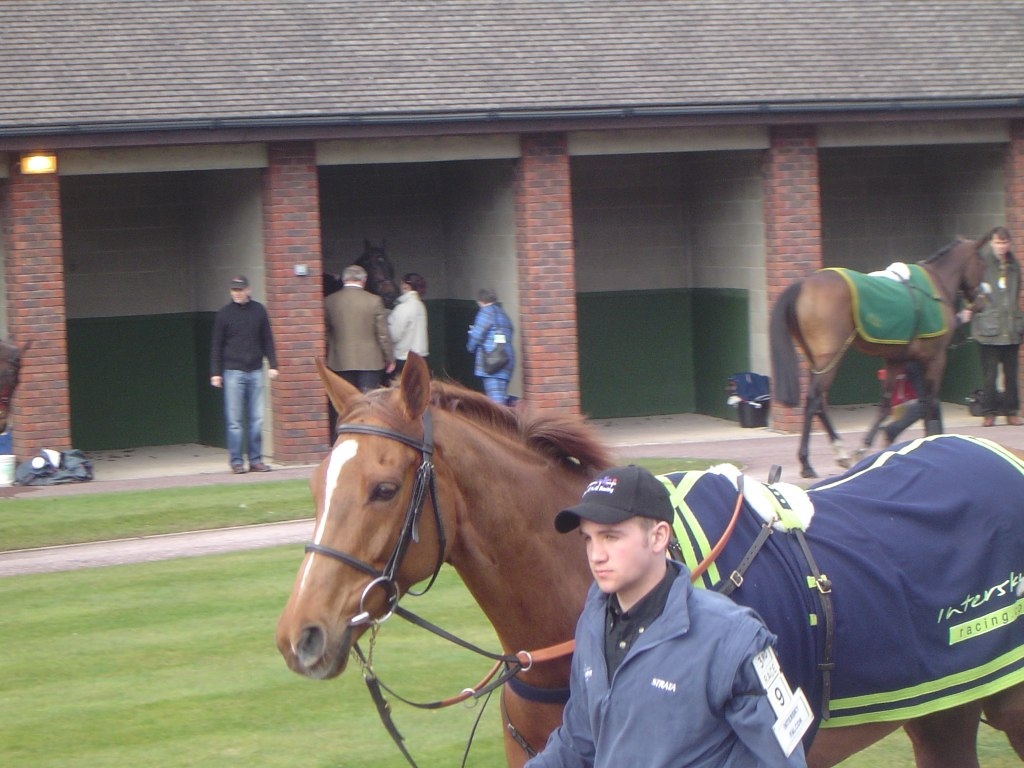
- Intersky Falcon at Cheltenham in 2005.
- Sire: Polar Falcon
- Grandsire: Nureyev
- Dam: I'll Try
- Damsire: Try My Best
- Sex: Gelding
- Foaled: 19 February 1997
- Country: United Kingdom
- Colour: Chestnut
- Breeder: Fulling Mill Farm and Stud
- Owner: Intersky Racing & Jacqui O'Neill
- Trainer: Jonjo O'Neill
- Record: 36:12-7-5
- Earnings: £390,998

Major wins
- Swinton Handicap Hurdle (2002); John James McManus Memorial Hurdle (2002, 2003); Fighting Fifth Hurdle (2002); Christmas Hurdle (2002, 2003)

Intersky Falcon (foaled 19 February 1997) is a retired British Thoroughbred racehorse who competed in National Hunt racing. He won eleven hurdle races and one steeplechase in a thirty-six race career which lasted from February 2001 until July 2006. He recorded his first major win when taking the Swinton Handicap Hurdle at Haydock Park Racecourse in May 2002. He went on to win the John James McManus Memorial Hurdle in Ireland in 2002 and 2003 and the Fighting Fifth Hurdle in 2002. Intersky Falcon's most notable achievement was to record back-to-back victories in the Christmas Hurdle, decisively defeating the reigning Champion Hurdler on each occasion. He never won at Cheltenham, but ran in four consecutive renewals of the Champion Hurdle, finishing fifth, third, sixth and eleventh.

== Background ==
Intersky Falcon is a chestnut gelding with a narrow white blaze bred by Fulling Mill Farm and Stud. He was probably the best jumper sired by Polar Falcon, an American-bred stallion who won the Lockinge Stakes and the Haydock Sprint Cup in 1991. As a breeding stallion his most influential offspring was Pivotal who won the Nunthorpe Stakes and became a very successful sire. Intersky Falcon's dam, I'll Try was an Irish-bred mare who won one race in England and three in the United States between 1984 and 1986. As a granddaughter of Mortefontaine, she was closely related to the Nunthorpe stakes winner Polyfoto and the Irish 1,000 Guineas winner Katies: as a broodmare, I'll Try also produced the Lincoln Handicap winner John Ferneley.

In September 1998, the yearling colt was sent to the sales at Doncaster and was bought for 17,500 guineas by the trainer and former jockey Jonjo O'Neill. During his racing career he was owned in partnership by O'Neill's wife Jacqui and Intersky Racing, a syndicate managed by the former international footballer Terry McDermott and whose 27 members included Alan Shearer. He was trained by O'Neill at Penrith in Cumbria before moving to the trainer's new base at Jackdaws Castle in Gloucestershire in 2001. Intersky Falcon usually raced in blinkers and showed a marked preference for fast ground.

== Racing career ==
=== Early career ===
Intersky Falcon began his racing career by competing in National Hunt Flat races, also known as "bumpers" in 2001. He finished third on his debut at Catterick Racecourse in February, second at Ayr in April and second again at Worcester in July. Later in July, he was switched to novice hurdle races and finished third at Stratford-on-Avon Racecourse. On 5 August, Intersky Falcon started 6/5 favourite for a novice hurdle at Market Rasen and recorded his first success. Ridden by the champion jockey A. P. McCoy, he took the lead after the final hurdle and drew away from his twelve opponents to win by seven lengths. Four weeks later he finished second when favourite at the same course but then won minor novice events at Sedgefield Racecourse in September (wearing blinkers for the first time) and November.

In the early part of 2002, Intersky Falcon, though still technically a novice, began to compete against more experienced rivals in handicap races. At Doncaster Racecourse in February he carried 152 pounds in a seven-runner handicap in which he was ridden by Liam Cooper and started at odds of 7/2. He led from the start, went clear of the field at the third last hurdle and won by five lengths from Renzo. After finishing sixth behind Latimer's Place at Sandown in March he was sent to Aintree Racecourse in April and started at odds of 10/1 for the Cordon Bleu Handicap Hurdle. Ridden by Cooper, and carrying the minimum weight of 140 pounds, he took the lead approaching the third last hurdle, he quickly went clear of the field and won very easily by fifteen lengths from Idaho d'Ox. The independent Timeform organisation wrote that he won "in a manner rarely seen in such a competitive handicap". In the weight-for-age Masai Hurdle at Sandown later that month he took the lead 75 yards from the finish but was beaten a short head by the rallying Copeland. On 4 May, Intersky Falcon carried top weight of 164 pounds in the Grade III Swinton Handicap Hurdle at Haydock Park Racecourse. Starting at odds of 11/2 in a field of eleven, he appeared outpaced three hurdles out, but rallied under strong driving from Cooper to take the lead in the closing stages and won by half a length from Granalmo.

=== 2002/2003 National Hunt season ===
In October 2002, Intersky Falcon began the new season with a trip to Ireland where he started 3/1 second favourite for the Grade II John James McManus Memorial Hurdle at Tipperary Racecourse. He went clear of the field four hurdles from the finish and held off the strong challenge of Bob What to win by one and a half lengths, with the favourite In Contrast ten lengths back in third. On 30 November, Intersky Falcon started 11/10 favourite for the Grade II (now Grade I) Fighting Fifth Hurdle at Newcastle Racecourse in which his opponents included the 2002 Champion Hurdle runner-up Marble Arch. He tracked the leader Castlehane before Cooper sent him into the lead after the sixth hurdle. In the closing stages he drew away from the field and won "very comfortably" by six lengths from The French Furze, with Marble Arch eight lengths further back in third place. After the race he was offered at odds of 10/1 for the Champion Hurdle, whilst the Racing Post reported that his official rating had risen by 46 pounds since the start of the year. On Boxing Day, Intersky Falcon faced the reigning Champion Hurdler Hors La Loi III in the Grade I Christmas Hurdle at Kempton Park Racecourse, which also attracted Marble Arch and the dual Grade I-winning Irish challenger Davenport Milenium. Ridden by Charlie Swan, he took the lead at the third hurdle and opened up a six length advantage over his opponents before appearing to tire two hurdles from the finish. At the final obstacle he was joined by the Paul Nicholls-trained outsider Santenay but went clear again on the run-in to win by three lengths. Hors La Loi finished fourth, twenty-two lengths behind the winner.

Intersky Falcon was expected to start favourite for the Irish Champion Hurdle at Leopardstown Racecourse in January but was withdrawn after contacting a respiratory infection: according to O'Neill he "didn't scope clean". On 11 March Intersky Falcon made his first appearance at the Cheltenham Festival when he started 5/1 third favourite behind Rhinestone Cowboy (also trained by O'Neill) and Rooster Booster for the Champion Hurdle. Before the race, O'Neill expressed the opinion that Intersky Falcon was more likely to win than Rhinestone Cowboy saying that the horse was "a complete one-off" and adding; "The improvement he has made has been amazing. He has got the experience, he is a quicker jumper and he has beaten all the Champion Horses – or a lot of them – in the trials". Cooper sent the gelding into the lead from the start and set a "furious pace" before being overtaken by Rooster Booster at the second last. He tired in the closing stages and finished fifth of the seventeen runners behind Rooster Booster, Westender, Rhinetone Cowboy and Self Defense.

=== 2003/2004 National Hunt season ===
On his first appearance of the 2003/2004, returned to Tipperary for a second John James McManus Hurdle and started 8/13 favourite against five opponents including the Supreme Novices' Hurdle winner Back In Front and the four-year-old Harchibald. He took the lead from the start and was never seriously challenged, winning by twelve lengths. O'Neill said "he is a lovely horse who keeps improving" and added that he was "a stronger horse" than he had been in the previous season. In November he started at odds of 1/2 in his attempt to win a second Fighting Fifth Hurdle despite conceding eight pounds to his seven opponents. He took the lead at the sixth hurdle but after a mistake at the last he was overtaken on the run-in and finished third behind The French Furze and Geos. After the race, Terry McDermott said; "We are in a state of shock. It looked a question of how far he was going to win, but when Liam asked him there was nothing there". At Kempton Park's Boxing Day meeting, Intersky Falcon was matched against the reigning Champion Hurdler Rooster Booster and the improving four-year-old Sporazene as he attempted to repeat his 2002 success in the Christmas Hurdle. Starting the 11/4 third choice in the betting, he was restrained by Cooper in the early stages before taking the lead from Brooklyn's Gold at the second last. He went clear of the field at the final obstacle and won by two and a half lengths from Rooster Booster. After the race he was made 9/2 second favourite for the Champion Hurdle. Terry McDermott said "This is a dream come true, as we had real trepidation after the way he ran at Newcastle. We've beaten a decent Champion Hurdle winner and hope he gets the recognition he deserves now. I'm not going to say he's going to win the Champion, but he must have a bloody good chance".

Intersky Falcon prepared for his second Champion Hurdle in the Kingwell Hurdle at Wincanton Racecourse in February. Starting the odds-on favourite he took the lead at the third last but was overtaken approaching the last and beaten three and a half lengths by the Bula Hurdle winner Rigmarole. In the Champion Hurdle at Cheltenham on 16 March, Intersky Falcon started the 8/1 third favourite behind Rooster Booster (11/8) and Rigamarole (4/1). He was towards the back of the field at the third last hurdle but stayed on well to finish third behind Hardy Eustace and Rooster Booster. In the Aintree Hurdle a month later he finished fourth behind Rhinestone Cowboy, Rooster Booster and Westender, beaten le than two lengths by the winner. On his final appearance of the season he finished fifth behind Hasty Prince (also trained by O'Neill) in the Concept Hurdle at Sandown on 23 April.

At the end of the season, the gelding underwent surgery to correct a respiratory problem.

=== Later career ===
Intersky Falcon remained in training for three more seasons, but failed to recapture his best form. In the 2004/2005 season he ran only three times, finishing fourth to Harchibald in the Fighting Fifth Hurdle, sixth to Hardy Eustace in the Champion Hurdle and eighth to Al Eile in the Aintree Hurdle. In the following year he was more active, but failed to win in seven races. His best results came when he finished second to Royal Shakespeare in the Elite Hurdle and second to Harchibald in the Bula Hurdle. He ran in the Champion Hurdle for a fourth time, finishing eleventh behind Brave Inca as a 66/1 outsider.

In 2006, Intersky Falcon was tried over steeplechase fences, making his debut over the larger obstacles at Newton Abbot Racecourse in May. Ridden by McCoy, he made some jumping errors but was not extended and won by twelve lengths from Kings Brook. At Stratford in July he was tailed off in a novice chase when being pulled up by McCoy in what proved to be his final racecourse appearance.

== Retirement ==
Intersky Falcon's retirement was announced shortly after his run at Stratford, with O'Neill commenting "He's been a smashing horse. He's won the Fighting Fifth, the Christmas Hurdle (twice) and we had a great run with him all the time. He didn't really like the fences that much but he's got out in one piece and we're all happy about that". McDermott said that the horse had "given us the best of our racing days over the past six years. We haven't completely finalised his retirement plan yet, but he deserves a good rest and a good home and he'll get that".

In November 2009, Intersky Falcon led the pre-race parade for the Fighting Fifth Hurdle at Newcastle.

== Pedigree ==
Pedigree of Intersky Falcon (GB), chestnut gelding, 1997
Sire Polar Falcon (USA) 1987	Nureyev (USA); 1977	Northern Dancer	Nearctic
Sire Polar Falcon (USA) 1987	Nureyev (USA); 1977	Northern Dancer	Natalma
Sire Polar Falcon (USA) 1987	Nureyev (USA); 1977	Special	Forli
Sire Polar Falcon (USA) 1987	Nureyev (USA); 1977	Special	Thong
Sire Polar Falcon (USA) 1987	Marie d'Argonne (FR); 1981	Jefferson	Charlottesville
Sire Polar Falcon (USA) 1987	Marie d'Argonne (FR); 1981	Jefferson	Monticella
Sire Polar Falcon (USA) 1987	Marie d'Argonne (FR); 1981	Mohair	Blue Tom
Sire Polar Falcon (USA) 1987	Marie d'Argonne (FR); 1981	Mohair	Imberline
Dam I'll Try (IRE) 1982	Try My Best (USA); 1975	Northern Dancer	Nearctic
Dam I'll Try (IRE) 1982	Try My Best (USA); 1975	Northern Dancer	Natalma
Dam I'll Try (IRE) 1982	Try My Best (USA); 1975	Sex Appeal	Buckpasser
Dam I'll Try (IRE) 1982	Try My Best (USA); 1975	Sex Appeal	Best In Show
Dam I'll Try (IRE) 1982	Polifontaine (FR); 1976	Bold Lad (IRE)	Bold Ruler
Dam I'll Try (IRE) 1982	Polifontaine (FR); 1976	Bold Lad (IRE)	Barn Pride
Dam I'll Try (IRE) 1982	Polifontaine (FR); 1976	Mortefontaine	Polic
Dam I'll Try (IRE) 1982	Polifontaine (FR); 1976	Mortefontaine	Brabantia (Family: 7-f)

- Intersky Falcon was inbred 3 x 3 to Northern Dancer, meaning that this stallion appears twice in the third generation of his pedigree.
