= Thunder Moon =

Irish Thoroughbred racehorse

- Racing silks of Anne Marie O'Brien and Chantal Regalado-Gonzalez
- Sire: Zoffany
- Grandsire: Dansili
- Dam: Small Sacrifice
- Damsire: Sadler's Wells
- Sex: Colt
- Foaled: 1 May 2018
- Country: Ireland
- Colour: Bay
- Breeder: Whisperview Trading
- Owner: Anne Marie O'Brien; Chantal Regalado-Gonzalez
- Trainer: Joseph Patrick O'Brien
- Record: 12: 2-2-2
- Earnings: £267,313

Major wins
- National Stakes (2020)

Thunder Moon (foaled 1 May 2018) is an Irish Thoroughbred racehorse. As a two-year-old in 2020 he made a successful debut in a maiden race and then won the Group 1 National Stakes.

== Background ==
Thunder Moon is a bay colt with a white star and snip bred in Ireland by Whisperview Trading a breeding company owned by Aidan O'Brien and his wife Anne Marie. He initially raced in the colours of Anne Marie O'Brien and was sent into training with her son Joseph Patrick O'Brien at Owning Hill, County Kilkenny.

He was from the sixth crop of foals sired by Zoffany, who won the Phoenix Stakes as a two-year-old but produced his best effort when running a close second to Frankel in the St James's Palace Stakes. His other foals have included Albigna, Ventura Storm (Gran Premio del Jockey Club), Washington DC (Windsor Castle Stakes) and Fleeting (May Hill Stakes). Thunder Moon's dam Small Sacrifice never appeared on a racecourse but was a granddaughter of the successful racehorse and broodmare Trusted Partner, whose other descendants have included Search For A Song and Free Eagle.

== Racing career ==
=== 2020: two-year-old season ===
Thunder Moon began his racing career in a maiden race over seven furlongs at the Curragh on 9 August when he was ridden by Declan McDonogh and started at odds of 10/1 in an eleven-runner field. After starting well and settling just behind the leaders he took the lead a furlong from the finish and drew away to win "easily" by almost four lengths. After the race the colt entered the ownership of Chantal Regalado-Rodriguez.

On 13 September Thunder Moon was moved up sharply in class to contest the Group 1 National Stakes at the Curragh in which he was again partnered by McDonogh. He went off the 15/2 third choice in the betting behind Lucky Vega and Master of the Seas (winner of the Superlative Stakes) in a ten-runner field which also included Military Style (Tyros Stakes), Law of Indices (Railway Stakes) and Mac Swiney. After tracking the leaders on the inside Thunder Moon struggled to obtain a clear run in the straight but when he found room to race he accelerated into the lead inside the final furlong and won in "impressive" fashion by one and a half lengths and a short head from Wembley and St Mark's Basilica. Declan McDonogh commented "He quickened very well. I just got on heels when I was trying to angle out a little bit and had to bite the bullet and sit and suffer, but he showed great heart when he got a bit of room and always gave me the feel that he was going to run them down. He's got a serious will to win." After the race he was made favourite for the following year's 2000 Guineas.

On 10 October Thunder Moon was sent to England and started the 11/4 favourite for the Dewhurst Stakes over seven furlongs at Newmarket Racecourse. After racing in mid-division he made steady progress in the closing stages but was beaten into third place behind St Mark's Basilica and Wembley, finishing two and a half lengths behind the winner.

In the official European classification of for 2020 Thunder Moon was given a rating of 117, making him the fourth best two-year-old of the season three pounds behind the top-rated St Mark's Basilica.

== Pedigree ==
Pedigree of Thunder Moon (IRE), bay colt 2018
Sire Zoffany (IRE) 2008	Dansili (GB); 1996	Danehill (USA)	Danzig
Sire Zoffany (IRE) 2008	Dansili (GB); 1996	Danehill (USA)	Razyana
Sire Zoffany (IRE) 2008	Dansili (GB); 1996	Hasili (IRE)	Kahyasi
Sire Zoffany (IRE) 2008	Dansili (GB); 1996	Hasili (IRE)	Kerali (GB)
Sire Zoffany (IRE) 2008	Tyranny (GB); 2000	Machiavellian (USA)	Mr. Prospector
Sire Zoffany (IRE) 2008	Tyranny (GB); 2000	Machiavellian (USA)	Coup de Folie
Sire Zoffany (IRE) 2008	Tyranny (GB); 2000	Dust Dancer	Suave Dancer (USA)
Sire Zoffany (IRE) 2008	Tyranny (GB); 2000	Dust Dancer	Galaxie Dust (USA)
Dam Small Sacrifice (IRE) 2004	Sadler's Wells (USA); 1981	Northern Dancer (CAN)	Nearctic
Dam Small Sacrifice (IRE) 2004	Sadler's Wells (USA); 1981	Northern Dancer (CAN)	Natalma (USA)
Dam Small Sacrifice (IRE) 2004	Sadler's Wells (USA); 1981	Fairy Bridge	Bold Reason
Dam Small Sacrifice (IRE) 2004	Sadler's Wells (USA); 1981	Fairy Bridge	Special
Dam Small Sacrifice (IRE) 2004	Trust In Luck (IRE); 1993	Nashwan (USA)	Blushing Groom (FR)
Dam Small Sacrifice (IRE) 2004	Trust In Luck (IRE); 1993	Nashwan (USA)	Height of Fashion (FR)
Dam Small Sacrifice (IRE) 2004	Trust In Luck (IRE); 1993	Trusted Partner (USA)	Affirmed
Dam Small Sacrifice (IRE) 2004	Trust In Luck (IRE); 1993	Trusted Partner (USA)	Talking Picture (Family: 9-f)
