= Fancy Blue =

Irish Thoroughbred racehorse

- Racing silks of Michael Tabor
- Sire: Deep Impact
- Grandsire: Sunday Silence
- Dam: Chenchikova
- Damsire: Sadler's Wells
- Sex: Filly
- Foaled: 2 February 2017
- Country: Ireland
- Colour: Bay
- Breeder: Coolmore Stud
- Owner: Michael Tabor, Derrick Smith & Susan Magnier
- Trainer: Aidan O'Brien; Donnacha O'Brien
- Record: 6: 4-1-1
- Earnings: £527,001

Major wins
- Staffordstown Stud Stakes (2019); Prix de Diane (2020); Nassau Stakes (2020)

Fancy Blue (foaled 2 February 2017) is an Irish Thoroughbred racehorse. She showed considerable promise as a juvenile in 2019 when she won both of her races including the Listed Staffordstown Stud Stakes. In the following year she finished second in the Irish 1,000 Guineas before winning the Prix de Diane and Nassau Stakes.

== Background ==
Fancy Blue is a bay filly with a white blaze and a white socks on her hind legs bred in Ireland by the Coolmore Stud. She is owned by the Coolmore partners Michael Tabor, Susan Magnier and Derrick Smith. Like many Coolmore horses she was sent into training with Aidan O'Brien at Ballydoyle.

She was from the ninth crop of foals sired by Deep Impact, who was the Japanese Horse of the Year in 2005 and 2006, winning races including the Tokyo Yushun, Tenno Sho, Arima Kinen and Japan Cup. Deep Impact's other progeny include Gentildonna, Harp Star, Kizuna, A Shin Hikari, Marialite and Saxon Warrior. Fancy Blue's dam Chenchikova showed modest racing ability, winning a maiden race on her debut but failing to win in five subsequent starts, but did better as a broodmare, producing several other winners including Smuggler's Cove (Star Appeal Stakes) and Casterton (Prix Lord Seymour). She was a full-sister to High Chaparral.

== Racing career ==
=== 2019: two-year-old season ===
Fancy Blue made her racecourse debut in a maiden race over seven furlongs at Naas Racecourse on 18 September and went off at odds of 6/1 in a fifteen-runner field. Ridden by her trainer's son Donnacha O'Brien she raced in mid-division before staying on strongly to overtake the favourite Chasing The Dawn in the closing stages and win by half a length. On 13 October the filly was moved up in class and distance for the Listed Staffordstown Stud Stakes over one mile on soft ground at the Curragh and started the 4/1 third choice in the betting behind A New Dawn (runner-up in the Weld Park Stakes) and Auxilia. With Seamie Heffernan in the saddle she started slowly but produced a sustained run from the rear of the field in the last quarter mile to win by a head from A New Dawn after taking the lead in the final strides. After the race Aidan O'Brien admitted that Donnacha O'Brien had been handling the filly at Longfield stable, near Goold's Cross, County Tipperary and added "She's a quality filly and Seamus gave her a lovely ride".

When Donnacha O'Brien retired from riding at the age of 21 in November 2019, Fancy Blue was one of the horses to join his training stable at Longfield.

=== 2020: three-year-old season ===
The flat racing season in Ireland was disrupted by the COVID-19 pandemic and the Group 1 Irish 1,000 Guineas was run three weeks later than usual on 13 June behind closed doors at the Curragh. Ridden by Declan McDonogh she started at odds of 12/1 in an eleven-runner field and stayed on well from the rear of the field, two lengths behind the winner Peaceful. On 5 July the filly was sent to France to contest the Prix de Diane over 2000 metres at Chantilly Racecourse in which she was ridden by Pierre-Charles Boudot and went off the 8.1/1 fourth choice in the betting behind Alpine Star, Peaceful and the undefeated Raabihah. The other seven runners included Speak of the Devil (runner-up in the Poule d'Essai des Pouliches), Solsticia (third in the Prix Saint-Alary), Miss Extra (Prix de Sandringham), Ebaiyra (Prix de Royaumont) and Magic Attitude (Prix Vanteaux). Boudot settled his filly in second place behind Alpine Star before moving up to take the lead 200 metres out. In a closely contested finish, Fancy Blue stayed on well under pressure to win by a short neck, a head and a head from Alpine Star, Peaceful and Raabihah. Donnacha O'Brien, who watched the event from Fairyhouse said "I always knew she was a very good filly and we always thought the step up in trip would suit her. It definitely did. Pierre-Charles is a very good rider and I told him beforehand he should do what he wants. There was no pace early so he went forward on her and sat upsides the leader. It was exactly what I would have liked him to do. She quickened up well and stuck at it. The home straight felt like a lifetime".

Twenty-five days after her victory in France, Fancy Blue was partnered by Ryan Moore when she was matched against older fillies and mares in the Group 1 Nassau Stakes over ten furlongs at Goodwood Racecourse in England. She went off the 11/4 second favourite behind Magic Wand (Mackinnon Stakes) in a seven-runner field which also included Nazeef and Deirdre. She settled in second place behind the front-running Magic Wand before taking the lead a furlong out and held off the challenge of the 20/1 outsider One Voice to win by a neck. Ryan Moore said "She's still a little bit babyish and possibly running downhill and the quick ground wasn't ideal for her, but she's very genuine. She has a great attitude" while Donnacha O'Brien, who was winning his first race in England commented "We were very happy with her coming into the race. Her work had been really good, she was in fantastic form and everything had gone perfectly to plan, so we were full of confidence".

On 12 September Fancy Blue started 9/4 favourite for the Matron Stakes over one mile at the Leopardstown Racecourse in which she was again partnered by Moore. After racing towards the rear of the eleven-runner field she made steady progress in the straight but never looked likely to win and finished third behind Champers Elysees and Peaceful.

== Pedigree ==
Pedigree of Fancy Blue (JPN), bay filly, 2017
Sire Deep Impact (JPN) 2002	Sunday Silence (USA); 1986	Halo	Hail to Reason
Sire Deep Impact (JPN) 2002	Sunday Silence (USA); 1986	Halo	Cosmah
Sire Deep Impact (JPN) 2002	Sunday Silence (USA); 1986	Wishing Well	Understanding
Sire Deep Impact (JPN) 2002	Sunday Silence (USA); 1986	Wishing Well	Mountain Flower
Sire Deep Impact (JPN) 2002	Wind in Her Hair (IRE); 1991	Alzao (USA)	Lyphard
Sire Deep Impact (JPN) 2002	Wind in Her Hair (IRE); 1991	Alzao (USA)	Lady Rebecca (GB)
Sire Deep Impact (JPN) 2002	Wind in Her Hair (IRE); 1991	Burghclere (GB)	Busted
Sire Deep Impact (JPN) 2002	Wind in Her Hair (IRE); 1991	Burghclere (GB)	Highclere
Dam Chenchikova (IRE) 2003	Sadler's Wells (USA); 1981	Northern Dancer (CAN)	Nearctic
Dam Chenchikova (IRE) 2003	Sadler's Wells (USA); 1981	Northern Dancer (CAN)	Natalma (USA)
Dam Chenchikova (IRE) 2003	Sadler's Wells (USA); 1981	Fairy Bridge	Bold Reason
Dam Chenchikova (IRE) 2003	Sadler's Wells (USA); 1981	Fairy Bridge	Special
Dam Chenchikova (IRE) 2003	Kasora (IRE); 1993	Darshaan (GB)	Shirley Heights
Dam Chenchikova (IRE) 2003	Kasora (IRE); 1993	Darshaan (GB)	Delsy (FR)
Dam Chenchikova (IRE) 2003	Kasora (IRE); 1993	Kozana (GB)	Kris
Dam Chenchikova (IRE) 2003	Kasora (IRE); 1993	Kozana (GB)	Koblenza (FR) (Family: 1-n)
