= Silken Glider Stakes =

Flat horse race in Ireland

Staffordstown Stud Stakes
2026
Chattering Classes	The Good Wife	Blonde Over Blue

Previous years
2025
Sugar Island	Thundering On	Ice Dancer
2024
Whirl	And So To Bed	Giselle
2023
Content	Kitty Rose	Dare To Dream
2022
Lumiere Rock	Gozen	Speirling Beag
2021
Limiti Di Greccio	Tranquil Lady	Sunset Shiraz

2020-2011
2020
Fantasy Lady	Sense Of Style	La Joconde
2019
Fancy Blue	A New Dawn	Auxilia
2018
Peach Tree	Tarnawa	Credenza
2017
Bye Bye Baby	Coeur D'amour	Ballet Shoes
2016
Calare	Bound	Queen Anne's Lace
2015
Best In The World	Dolce Strega	Rayisa
2014
Together Forever	Cocoon	Quinta Verde
2013
Flying Jib	Chicago Girl	Dazzling
2012
Seolan	Rehn's Nest	Rawaaq
2011
Homecoming Queen	Absolute Crackers	Ronan's Bay

2010-2001
2010
Gemstone	Rising Wind	Hurricane Havoc
2009
Lady Lupus	Atasari	Akdarena
2007
Savethisdanceforme	Maryellen's Spirit	Queen Jock
2006
Boca Dancer	Sensible Lady	Essexford
2005
Jioconda	Million Waves	Gemini Gold
2004
Allexina	Adaala	Alexander Icequeen
2003
Alexander Goldrun	Poetical	Treasure The Lady
2002
Miss Helga	Feabhas	Dixie Evans
2001
Marionnaud	Luminous Beauty	Madame Cerito

The Silken Glider Stakes is a Group 3 flat horse race in Ireland open to two-year-old thoroughbred fillies. It is run at the Curragh over a distance of 1 mile (1,609 metres), and it is scheduled to take place each year in September.

The race was first run in 2001. It was run at Leopardstown until 2002. Since 2007 it has been sponsored and run as the Staffordstown Stud Stakes.

The Silken Glider Stakes is promoted to Group 3 in 2022.

== Records ==
Leading jockey (3 wins):

- Seamie Heffernan – Miss Helga (2002), Savethisdanceforme (2007), Fancy Blue (2019)
- Johnny Murtagh– Jioconda (2005), Lady Lupus (2009), Gemstone (2010)

Leading trainer (13 wins):

- Aidan O'Brien – Miss Helga (2002), Savethisdanceforme (2007), Lady Lupus (2009), Gemstone (2010), Homecoming Queen (2011), Together Forever (2014), Best In The World (2015), Bye Bye Baby (2017), Peach Tree (2018), Fancy Blue (2019), Content (2023), Whirl (2024), Sugar Island (2025)

== Winners ==
Year	Winner	Jockey	Trainer	Time
2001	Marionnaud	Kevin Manning	Jim Bolger	1:45.10
2002	Miss Helga	Seamie Heffernan	Aidan O'Brien	0.00
2003	Alexander Goldrun	Kevin Manning	Jim Bolger	1:45.20
2004	Allexina	Fran Berry	John Oxx	1:48.50
2005	Jioconda	Johnny Murtagh	Edward Lynam	1:46.00
2006	Boca Dancer	Declan McDonogh	Kevin Prendergast	1:45.80
2007	Savethisdanceforme	Seamie Heffernan	Aidan O'Brien	1:44.37
2008	Turin Lady	Pat Shanahan	Tracey Collins	2:09.80
2009	Lady Lupus	Johnny Murtagh	Aidan O'Brien	1:47.18
2010	Gemstone	Johnny Murtagh	Aidan O'Brien	1:46.48
2011	Homecoming Queen	Joseph O'Brien	Aidan O'Brien	1:41.60
2012	Seolan	Chris Hayes	Paddy Prendergast Jr.	1:51.74
2013	Flying Jib	Pat Smullen	Dermot Weld	1:40.08
2014	Together Forever	Joseph O'Brien	Aidan O'Brien	1:42.91
2015	Best In The World	Ryan Moore	Aidan O'Brien	1:43.88
2016	Calare	James Doyle	Charlie Appleby	1:44.95
2017	Bye Bye Baby (Note: The 2017 and 2018 runnings took place at Navan)	Donnacha O'Brien	Aidan O'Brien	1:53.01
2018	Peach Tree	Donnacha O'Brien	Aidan O'Brien	1:44.65
2019	Fancy Blue	Seamie Heffernan	Aidan O'Brien	1:53.09
2020	Fantasy Lady (Note: The 2020 race took place in October due to the COVID-19 pandemic in the Republic of Ireland)	Billy Lee	Paddy Twomey	1:48.90
2021	Limiti Di Greccio	Billy Lee	Paddy Twomey	1:44.72
2022	Lumiere Rock	Mikey Sheehy	Joseph O'Brien	1:45.88
2023	Content	Chris Hayes	Aidan O'Brien	1:45.13
2024	Whirl	Wayne Lordan	Aidan O'Brien	1:41.75
2025	Sugar Island	Wayne Lordan	Aidan O'Brien	1:43.68
2026	Chattering Classes	Shane Foley	Jessica Harrington	1:42.58

== See also ==
- Horse racing in Ireland
- List of Irish flat horse races
