= Istabraq Hurdle =

National Hunt horse race in Ireland

Istabraq Hurdle
2025
Gaucher	Jesse Evans	Enniskerry

Previous years
2024
Daddy Long Legs	Smooth Tom	Winter Fog
2023
Fils D'oudairies	Deo Bellator	Only two finished
2022
Jesse Evans	Effernock Fizz	Abacadabras
2021
Saldier	Darasso	Jason The Militant

2020-2011
2020
Saint Roi	Tigris River	Wonder Laish
2019
Davids Charm	Plinth	Winter Escape
2018
Bedrock	Plinth	Wicklow Brave
2017
Jezki	Coquin Mans	Ex Patriot
2016
Ivan Grozny	Bentelimar	Hargam
2015
Plinth	Fethard Player	Thomas Edison
2014
Rebel Fitz	Darwins Fox	The Game Changer
2013
Captain Cee Bee	Midnight Game	False Economy
2012
Captain Cee Bee	Rebel Fitz	Miley Shah
2011
The Real Article	Luska Lad	Donnas Palm

2010-2001
2010
Donnas Palm	Aitmatov	On The Way Out
2009
Go Native	Carthalawn	River Liane
2008
Megans Joy	Larkwing	Heavenly Blues
2007
Salford City	Definate Spectacle	Jubilant Note
2006
Scarthy Lad	Maralan	Ceeawayhome
2005
Harchibald	Ansar	Calorando
2004
Solerina	Accordion Etoile	Harchibald
2003
Intersky Falcon	Back In Front	Take Flite
2002
Intersky Falcon	Bob What	In Contrast
2001
Ansar	Grimes	Liss A Paoraigh

2000-1997
2000
Knife Edge	Youlneverwalkalone	Moscow Flyer
1999
Istabraq	Limestone Lad	Master Beveled
1998
Istabraq	Master Beveled	Padre Mio
1997
Istabraq	Cockney Lad	Bolino Star

The Istabraq Hurdle is a Grade 3 National Hunt hurdle race in Ireland which is open to horses aged four years or older. It is run at Tipperary Racecourse over a distance of about 2 miles (3,219 metres), and it is scheduled to take place each year in early October.

The race was first run in 1997 and prior to 2006 was known as the John James McManus Memorial Hurdle. From 2007 to 2013 it was run as the Tipperary Hurdle. Since the 2018 running the race has been sponsored by the Horse & Jockey Hotel. It now takes place at a meeting which features both jump and flat races, and it is held on the same afternoon as the Concorde Stakes.

== Records ==
Most successful horse (3 wins):

- Istabraq – 1997, 1998, 1999

Leading jockey (5 wins):

- Mark Walsh – Captain Cee Bee (2011,2012), Plinth (2015), Jezki (2017), Saint Roi (2020)

Leading trainer (5 wins):

- Willie Mullins - Ivan Grozny (2016), Saint Roi (2020), Saldier (2021), Daddy Long Legs (2024), Gaucher (2025)

== Winners ==
Year	Winner	Age	Jockey	Trainer
1997	Istabraq	5	Charlie Swan	Aidan O'Brien
1998	Istabraq (Note: The 1998 and 2000 editions were held at Cork Racecourse)	6	Charlie Swan	Aidan O'Brien
1999	Istabraq	7	Charlie Swan	Aidan O'Brien
2000	Knife Edge	5	Tom Rudd	Michael O'Brien
2001	Ansar	5	Paul Carberry	Dermot Weld
2002	Intersky Falcon	5	Liam Cooper	Jonjo O'Neill
2003	Intersky Falcon	6	Liam Cooper	Jonjo O'Neill
2004	Solerina	7	Gary Hutchinson	James Bowe
2005	Harchibald	6	Paul Carberry	Noel Meade
2006	Scarthy Lad	8	Barry Geraghty	Thomas Gerard O'Leary
2007	Salford City	6	Nina Carberry	Gordon Elliot
2008	Megans Joy	6	Davy Russell	Colm Murphy
2009	Go Native	6	Paul Carberry	Noel Meade
2010	Donnas Palm	6	Paul Carberry	Noel Meade
2011	The Real Article	6	Barry Geraghty	Edward O'Grady
2012	Captain Cee Bee	11	Mark Walsh	Edward Harty
2013	Captain Cee Bee	12	Mark Walsh	Edward Harty
2014	Rebel Fitz	9	Barry Geraghty	Michael Winters
2015	Plinth	5	Mark Walsh	Aidan O'Brien
2016	Ivan Grozny	5	Ruby Walsh	Willie Mullins
2017	Jezki	9	Mark Walsh	Jessica Harrington
2018	Bedrock	5	Rachael Blackmore	Iain Jardine
2019	Davids Charm	8	Phillip Enright	John J Walsh
2020	Saint Roi	5	Mark Walsh	Willie Mullins
2021	Saldier	7	Danny Mullins	Willie Mullins
2022	Jesse Evans	6	Bryan Cooper	Noel Meade
2023	Fils D'oudairies	8	Jack Kennedy	Gordon Elliott
2024	Daddy Long Legs	5	Paul Townend	Willie Mullins
2025	Gaucher	6	Paul Townend	Willie Mullins
2026	El Cairos	6	Jack Kennedy	Gordon Elliott

== See also ==
- Horse racing in Ireland
- List of Irish National Hunt races
