= Together Forever (horse) =

Thoroughbred racehorse

- Racing silks of Sue Magnier
- Sire: Galileo
- Grandsire: Sadler's Wells
- Dam: Green Room
- Damsire: Theatrical
- Sex: Mare
- Foaled: 19 March 2012
- Country: Ireland
- Colour: Bay
- Breeder: Vimal and Gillian Khosla
- Owner: Susan Magnier, Michael Tabor and Derrick Smith
- Trainer: Aidan O'Brien
- Record: 9: 3-2-1
- Earnings: £201,658

Major wins
- Staffordstown Stud Stakes (2014); Fillies' Mile (2014)

Together Forever (foaled 19 March 2012) is an Irish Thoroughbred racehorse. After being beaten in her first three races she showed significant progress in the autumn of her two-year-old season winning three races of increasing prestige. She followed up a win in a maiden race with a victory in the Listed Staffordstown Stud Stakes before ending her season by taking the Group One Fillies' Mile. She failed to win as a three-year-old but finished second in the Musidora Stakes and fourth in the Irish Oaks. As a broodmare she is the dam of the 2024 Epsom Derby winner City Of Troy.

== Background ==
Together Forever is a bay mare with a white star and a white sock on her left hind leg bred in Ireland by the entrepreneur Vimal Khosla and his wife Gillian. She was sired by Galileo, who won the Derby, Irish Derby and King George VI and Queen Elizabeth Stakes in 2001. Galileo became one of the world's leading stallions and has been champion sire of Great Britain and Ireland five times. His other progeny include Cape Blanco, Frankel, Golden Lilac, Nathaniel, New Approach, Rip Van Winkle and Ruler of the World. Her dam Green Room an unraced daughter of the Breeders' Cup Turf winner Theatrical and had previously produced Lord Shanakill, a horse whose wins included the Mill Reef Stakes, Prix Jean Prat and Lennox Stakes. Green Room's dam Chain Fern was full-sister of the leading racehorse and broodmare Al Bahathri.

As a yearling the filly was consigned to the Goffs sale in October 2013. She was bought for €680,000 by Michael Magnier, acting on behalf of the Coolmore Stud organisation. The filly was sent into training with Aidan O'Brien at Ballydoyle. Like many of the Coolmore racehorses the details of her ownership changed from race to race: she was sometimes listed as being owned by Susan Magnier whilst on other occasions she was described as the property of a partnership involving Magnier, Derrick Smith and Michael Tabor.

== Racing career ==
=== 2014: two-year-old season ===
Together Forever was ridden in all six of her races as a two-year-old by her trainer's son Joseph O'Brien. The filly began her racing career by finishing fourth to Legatissimo in a seven furlong maiden race at Galway Races on 29 July. At the Curragh on 23 August she started 11/10 favourite for a similar event over one mile but after leading for most of the way she was overtaken and beaten three quarters of a length by her stable companion Found. Eight days later she turned out again for the Listed Flame of Tara Stakes over the same course and distance. She led until the final furlong before being overtaken and finished third behind Jack Naylor (a filly despite her name) and Legatissimo. In September the filly was dropped back in class for a maiden race over one mile at Gowran Park and started the 8/13 favourite against fifteen opponents. Together Forever tracked the leaders before taking the lead two furlongs out and drew away from the field to win "easily" by five lengths. Together Forever moved back up to Listed level for the Staffordstown Stud Stakes over one mile at the Curragh on 12 October. Starting the 11/10 favourite she took the lead a quarter of a mile from the finish, repelled a challenge from her stablemate Cocoon and won by three lengths.

Five days after her win at the Curragh, Together Forever was sent to England to contest the Group One Fillies' Mile at Newmarket Racecourse. The Rockfel Stakes winner Lucida started favourite ahead of the Dick Poole Fillies' Stakes runner up Marsh Hawk and the May Hill Stakes winner Agnes Stewart with Together Forever fourth choice in the betting at odds of 7/1. The other three runners were Forte from the Ralph Beckett stable and the Godolphin pair Good Place and Winters Moon. O'Brien positioned the filly before behind the pacemakers before moving up to take the lead approaching the final furlong at which point the early leader Marsh Hawk was engaged in a "barging match" with Lucida. Together Forever kept on well in the closing stages and won by half a length and a short head from Agnes Stewart and Winters Moon. Explaining the filly's improvement, Joseph O'Brien said "In the early part of the season we made use of her massive stride in her maiden and it just didn't seem to work. Then at Gowran I tucked her in and got her to relax and I felt a turn of foot that I hadn't felt before and she's done nothing but improve since. I think she has plenty of pace and there is no reason why she couldn't start at a Guineas and go on to an Oaks".

=== 2015: three-year-old season ===
Although Together Forever was expected to contest the 1000 Guineas the filly bypassed the race and made her three-year-old debut in the Musidora Stakes (a trial race for The Oaks) over ten and a half furlongs at York Racecourse on 13 May. Ridden by Ryan Moore she chased the leaders and stayed on well in the straight but failed by a head to overhaul the favourite Star of Seville. In the 237th running of the Oaks Stakes over one and a half miles at Epsom Downs Racecourse on 5 June the filly started 9/1 fourth choice in the betting behind Legatissimo, Jack Naylor and Lady of Dubai. After reaching second place in the straight she was badly hampered and finished seventh behind her stable companion Qualify. Seamie Heffernan took the ride when the filly contested the Irish Oaks at the Curragh on 18 July. In a change of tactics Together Forever went to the front soon after the start and opened up an eight length advantage over her rivals. She faded in the straight however, lost the lead a furlong out and finished fourth behind Covert Love.

== Stud career ==
As of 2024, Together Forever has foaled six horses. Her first five foals have all won at least once and her most successful offspring is City of Troy (by Justify), who won four Group 1 races in 2023 and 2024 including the Epsom Derby.

== Pedigree ==
Pedigree of Together Forever (IRE), bay filly, 2012
| Sire Galileo (IRE) 1998 | Sadler's Wells (USA); 1981 | Northern Dancer | Nearctic |
| Sire Galileo (IRE) 1998 | Sadler's Wells (USA); 1981 | Northern Dancer | Natalma |
| Sire Galileo (IRE) 1998 | Sadler's Wells (USA); 1981 | Fairy Bridge | Bold Reason |
| Sire Galileo (IRE) 1998 | Sadler's Wells (USA); 1981 | Fairy Bridge | Special |
| Sire Galileo (IRE) 1998 | Urban Sea (USA); 1989 | Miswaki | Mr. Prospector |
| Sire Galileo (IRE) 1998 | Urban Sea (USA); 1989 | Miswaki | Hopespringseternal |
| Sire Galileo (IRE) 1998 | Urban Sea (USA); 1989 | Allegretta | Lombard |
| Sire Galileo (IRE) 1998 | Urban Sea (USA); 1989 | Allegretta | Anatevka |
| Dam Green Room (USA) 2002 | Theatrical (IRE); 1982 | Nureyev | Northern Dancer |
| Dam Green Room (USA) 2002 | Theatrical (IRE); 1982 | Nureyev | Special |
| Dam Green Room (USA) 2002 | Theatrical (IRE); 1982 | Tree of Knowledge | Sassafras |
| Dam Green Room (USA) 2002 | Theatrical (IRE); 1982 | Tree of Knowledge | Sensibility |
| Dam Green Room (USA) 2002 | Chain Fern (USA); 1986 | Blushing Groom | Red God |
| Dam Green Room (USA) 2002 | Chain Fern (USA); 1986 | Blushing Groom | Runaway Bride |
| Dam Green Room (USA) 2002 | Chain Fern (USA); 1986 | Chain Store | Nodouble |
| Dam Green Room (USA) 2002 | Chain Fern (USA); 1986 | Chain Store | General Store (Family 9-e) |

- Together Forever is inbred 3 × 4 to Northern Dancer meaning that this stallion appears in both the third and fourth generations of her pedigree.
