= Zoffany (Irish-bred horse) =

Irish Thoroughbred racehorse

- Sire: Dansili
- Grandsire: Danehill
- Dam: Tyranny
- Damsire: Machiavellian
- Sex: Stallion
- Foaled: 18 March 2008
- Died: 8 January 2021 (aged 12)
- Country: Ireland
- Colour: Bay
- Breeder: Epona Bloodstock Ltd
- Owner: Derrick Smith, Susan Magnier & Michael Tabor
- Trainer: Aidan O'Brien
- Record: 13: 5-3-1
- Earnings: £337,075

Major wins
- Golden Fleece Stakes (2010); Tyros Stakes (2010); Phoenix Stakes (2010)

Zoffany (18 March 2008 – 8 January 2021) was an Irish Thoroughbred racehorse and sire. He was one of the best two-year-olds of 2010 in Ireland when he won five of his seven races including the Golden Fleece Stakes, Tyros Stakes and Phoenix Stakes. In the following year he failed to win a race but produced a career-best effort to run Frankel to three quarters of a length in the St James's Palace Stakes. He was retired from racing at the end of the year to become a breeding stallion and made a very promising start to his stud career. He died on 8 January 2021 at the age of 13 due to liver failure.

== Background ==
Zoffany was a bay horse with a small white star and a white sock on his right hind leg bred by Epona Bloodstock at the Croom House Stud in County Limerick. As a yearling in October 2009 the colt was consigned to the Tattersalls sale and was bought for 220,000 guineas by the Coolmore Stud's John Magnier. The colt was sent into training with Aidan O'Brien at Ballydoyle. Like many Coolmore horses the details of the colt's ownership changed from race to race: he sometimes raced in the colours of Michael Tabor, while on others he was described as the property of a partnership between Tabor, Smith, and Susan Magnier.

He was sired by Dansili, whose other progeny have included the leading middle distance winners Harbinger, The Fugue, and Rail Link. Zoffany's dam Tyranny showed modest racing ability, winning two minor races from ten attempts, before becoming a successful broodmare whose other foals have included Wilshire Boulevard (Anglesey Stakes), and Rostropovich (Futurity Stakes). She was distantly descended from the influential American broodmare Etoile Filante (foaled 1918).

== Racing career ==
=== 2010: two-year-old season ===
Zoffany was ridden in all but one of his races as a two-year-old by Johnny Murtagh. He made his debut in a maiden race over six furlongs at Leopardstown Racecourse on 18 April and won easily ("not extended") at odds of 4/7. In a minor race at Naas Racecourse on 12 May he won by three and a half lengths after accelerating "impressively" a furlong out. The colt was then sent to England and moved up in class for the Group 2 Coventry Stakes at Royal Ascot in June and finished sixth of the thirteen runners behind the favourite Strong Suit. Seamie Heffernan took the ride when Zoffany started odds-on favourite for the Listed Golden Fleece Stakes over seven furlongs at Leopardstown on 1 July. After racing at the rear of the four-runner field he took the lead just inside the final furlong and won "comfortably" from the British-trained Stentorian. Heffernan commented "He's a good horse. He was a bit disappointing at Royal Ascot but he learned a lot from it. I think he'd stay a mile".

Three weeks after his win in the Golden Fleece takes, Zoffany started at 1/7 against three opponents for the Group 3 Tyros Stakes over the same course and distance. After racing in second place behind his stablemate High Ruler he went to the front a furlong and a half from the finish and recorded another easy victory as he won by two lengths. The O'Brien stable provided four of the seven runners for the Group 1 Phoenix Stakes at the Curragh on 8 August with Zoffany being accompanied by the Marble Hill Stakes winner Samuel Morse and the outsiders Emperor Hadrian and Snow Mountain. The other three contenders were Strong Suit (the 4/9 favourite), Glor Na Mara and Foolproof. Starting at odds of 3/1, Zoffany raced towards the rear of the field as Snow Mountain set the early pace, before beginning a sustained run inside the last quarter mile. He overhauled Glor Na Mara and Strong Suit in the closing stages to win by half a length and a short head. After the race O'Brien said "He went to Ascot as a baby and it all happened a little bit too fast for him. We stepped him up in trip so things would happen a bit slower. The plan was to get him relaxed and Johnny was very cool on him and gave him a great ride. He's getting heavier all of the time and he's a lot stronger and more mature now. As long as he keeps putting on weight we'll keep going with him. We'll take it one step at a time."

After five wins in six races Zoffany went off the 6/4 favourite against eight opponents for the National Stakes at the Curragh on 11 September. After tracking the leaders in the early stages he came under pressure two furlongs out and finished third behind Pathfork and Casamento, beaten more than five lengths by the winner.

=== 2011: three-year-old season ===
Zoffany did not race in the spring of 2011 and made his reappearance on 29 May at Leopardstown in the Ballycorus Stakes a race which saw him matched against older horse and carrying a five-pound weight penalty for his Group 1 success. Ridden by Colm O'Donoghue, he finished second of the eight runners behind the four-year-old filly Bewitched. On 4 June he ran for the second time at Royal Ascot and started a 20/1 outsider in a very strong renewal of the St James's Palace Stakes in which the nine runner field was headed by Frankel and also included Excelebration, Dream Ahead and Wootton Bassett. Ridden by Ryan Moore he raced at the rear of the field and was still in last place approaching the straight, by which time Frankel had opened up a lead of at least five lengths. Frankel began to struggle in the straight, but Zoffany produced a sustained run on the outside, overtook the other seven runners, and failed by only three quarters of a length to catch the favourite. The performance made him the second and final horse (the other was Nathaniel) to finish within a length of Frankel during that colt's career.

In July Zoffany started favourite for the Prix Jean Prat over 1600 metres at Chantilly Racecourse, but was beaten in a three-way photo finish as he failed by a head to catch Mutual Trust with Strong Suit a nose away in third. In the Prix Jacques Le Marois a month later he ran poorly as he finished twelfth of the thirteen runners behind Moonlight Cloud having been eased down by his jockey Christophe Soumillon when his chance of winning had gone. On his last two starts the colt was sent to race in North America, but failed to recover his best form. He finished last behind Gio Ponti in the Shadwell Turf Mile Stakes and was unplaced behind Court Vision in the Breeders' Cup Mile.

== Stud record ==
Zoffany was retired from racing to become a breeding stallion for the Coolmore Stud, moving between studs in Ireland and Australia. He made an immediate impact with his early crops.

His offspring have included Jayarebe (Hampton Court Stakes, Prix Dollar), Albigna, Thunder Moon, Ventura Storm (Gran Premio del Jockey Club, Prix de Reux, Feilden Stakes, Glasgow Stakes), Foundation (Royal Lodge Stakes, Ascendant Stakes), Illuminate (Duchess of Cambridge Stakes, Albany Stakes), Waterloo Bridge (Norfolk Stakes), Knife Edge (Mehl-Mülhens-Rennen), Dolce Strega (Athasi Stakes), Architecture (runner-up in The Oaks), Washington, D.C. (Phoenix Sprint Stakes, Windsor Castle Stakes), Argentero Rochestown Stakes, Light Up Our World (Coral Distaff), Wilamina (Nottinghamshire Oaks), Mother Earth (1000 Guineas, Prix Rothschild) and Prosperous Voyage (Falmouth Stakes).

== Pedigree ==
Pedigree of Zoffany (IRE), bay stallion, 2008
Sire Dansili (GB) 1996	Danehill (USA); 1986	Danzig	Northern Dancer
Sire Dansili (GB) 1996	Danehill (USA); 1986	Danzig	Pas de Nom
Sire Dansili (GB) 1996	Danehill (USA); 1986	Razyana	His Majesty
Sire Dansili (GB) 1996	Danehill (USA); 1986	Razyana	Spring Adieu
Sire Dansili (GB) 1996	Hasili (IRE); 1991	Kahyasi	Ile de Bourbon
Sire Dansili (GB) 1996	Hasili (IRE); 1991	Kahyasi	Kadissya
Sire Dansili (GB) 1996	Hasili (IRE); 1991	Kerali	High Line
Sire Dansili (GB) 1996	Hasili (IRE); 1991	Kerali	Sookera
Dam Tyranny (GB) 2000	Machiavellian (USA); 1987	Mr. Prospector	Raise a Native
Dam Tyranny (GB) 2000	Machiavellian (USA); 1987	Mr. Prospector	Gold Digger
Dam Tyranny (GB) 2000	Machiavellian (USA); 1987	Coup de Folie	Halo
Dam Tyranny (GB) 2000	Machiavellian (USA); 1987	Coup de Folie	Raise the Standard
Dam Tyranny (GB) 2000	Dust Dancer (GB); 1994	Suave Dancer	Green Dancer
Dam Tyranny (GB) 2000	Dust Dancer (GB); 1994	Suave Dancer	Suavite
Dam Tyranny (GB) 2000	Dust Dancer (GB); 1994	Galaxie Dust	Blushing Groom
Dam Tyranny (GB) 2000	Dust Dancer (GB); 1994	Galaxie Dust	High Galaxie (Family 1-c)
