= Corrib Fillies Stakes =

Flat horse race in Ireland

Corrib Fillies Stakes
2026
Pivotal Attack	Meriden	La Brodeuse

Previous years
2025
Tropical Island	Princess Child	Easy Mover
2024
Raknah	Princess Child	Ojw Legacy
2023
Miramis	Keep In Touch	Dandy Alys
2022
Surrounding	Emilie Gray	Nectaris
2021
Galtee Mist	Lustown Baba	Royal Canford

2020-2012
2020
Champers Elysees	Auxilia	A New Dawn
2019
Surrounding	Titanium Sky	Black Magic Woman
2018
Yulong Gold Fairy	Panstarr	Ship Of Dreams
2017
Music Box	Drumfad Bay	Duchess Of France
2016
Planchart	Rayisa	Ibergman
2015
Laviniad	Tested	Corail
2014
Dalkova	Tested	Colour Blue
2013
Yellow Rosebud	Snow Queen	Ondeafears
2012
Lady Wingshot	Yellow Rosebud	Rock On Ciara

The Corrib Fillies Stakes is a Listed flat horse race in Ireland open to mares and fillies aged three years or older. It is run at Galway over a distance of 7 furlongs (1,408 metres), and it is scheduled to take place each year at the Galway Festival in late July or early August.

The race was first run in 2012.

== Records ==
Most successful horse (2 wins):

- Surrounding (2019,2022)

Leading jockey (3 wins):

- Gary Carroll - Galtee Mist (2021), Raknah (2024), Pivotal Attack (2026)

Leading trainer (2 wins):

- Dermot Weld – Yellow Rosebud (2013), Yulong Gold Fairy (2018)
- Johnny Murtagh – Dalkova (2014), Champers Elysees (2020)
- Michael Halford – Surrounding (2019,2022)
- Joseph Murphy - - Galtee Mist (2021), Pivotal Attack (2026)

== Winners ==
Year	Winner	Age	Jockey	Trainer	Time
2012	Lady Wingshot	3	Kevin Manning	Jim Bolger	1:28.55
2013	Yellow Rosebud	4	Pat Smullen	Dermot Weld	1:31.40
2014	Dalkova	5	Niall McCullagh	Johnny Murtagh	1:27.01
2015	Laviniad	5	Declan McDonogh	Willie Mullins	1:27.71
2016	Planchart	3	Declan McDonogh	Andrew Slattery	1:28.76
2017	Music Box	3	Donnacha O'Brien	Aidan O'Brien	1:31.10
2018	Yulong Gold Fairy	3	Shane Foley	Dermot Weld	1:28.77
2019	Surrounding	6	Ronan Whelan	Michael Halford	1:27.42
2020	Champers Elysees	3	Ben Coen	Johnny Murtagh	1:27.67
2021	Galtee Mist	5	Gary Carroll	Joseph Murphy	1:30.40
2022	Surrounding	9	Ronan Whelan	Michael Halford	1:28.45
2023	Miramis	5	Dylan Browne McMonagle	Joseph O'Brien	1:29.70
2024	Raknah	3	Gary Carroll	Jessica Harrington	1:29.18
2025	Tropical Island	4	Luke McAteer	Richard Fahey	1:29.89
2026	Pivotal Attack	3	Gary Carroll	Joseph Murphy	1:30.27

== See also ==
- Horse racing in Ireland
- List of Irish flat horse races
