= Swinton Handicap Hurdle =

Hurdle horse race in Britain

- Class: Grade 3
- Location: Haydock Park, Haydock, England
- Race type: Hurdle race
- Sponsor: Pertemps
- Website: Haydock Park

Race information
- Distance: 1m 7f 144y (3,149 metres)
- Surface: Turf
- Track: Left-handed
- Qualification: Four-years-old and up
- Weight: Handicap
- Purse: £80,000 (2024); 1st: £45,560

Swinton Hurdle
2026
| Moon Chime | Laafi | Dance And Glance |

Previous years
2025
Our Champ | Helnwein | Goblet Of Fire
2024
Pickanumber | Tapley | Tintintin
2023
Black Poppy | Teddy Blue | Takeit Easy
2022
N'Golo | Severance | Sebastopol
2021
Copperless | Cormier | Camprond

2020-2011
2019
Le Patriote | Project Bluebook | John Constable
2018
Silver Streak | Chesterfield | Ashkoul
2017
John Constable | Optimus Prime | Great Fighter
2016
Gwafa | All Set To Go | Ch'tibello
2015
War Sound | Barizan | Song Light
2014
Ballyglasheen | Barizan | Vibrato Valtat
2013
Barizan | Mr Mole | Local Hero
2012
Red Merlin | Tony Star | Double Ross
2011
Eradicate | Knight in Purple | Hunterview

2010-2001
2010
Eradicate | Overturn | Issaquah
2009
Joe Jo Star | Ellerslie Tom | Hot Diamond
2008
Blue Bajan | I'm So Lucky | Ellerslie Tom
2007
Leslingtaylor | French Saulaie | Orpen Wide
2006
Acambo | Callow Lake | Saif Sareea
2005
Coat of Honour | Definite Spectacle | Crossbow Creek
2004
Macs Joy | Dancing Bay | Torrid Kentavr
2003
Altay | Patsy Veale | In Contrast
2002
Intersky Falcon | Gralmano | Whistling Dixie
2001
Milligan | Docklands Limo | Reiziger

2000-1991
2000
Mirjan | The French Furze | Dhaudeloup
1999
She's Our Mare | Papua | Auetaler
1998
Rainbow Frontier | Rubhahunish | Summer Spell
1997
Dreams End | Mister Rm | Shankar
1996
Tragic Hero | Dreams End | Kaitak
1995
Chief Minister | Eurolink The Lad | Blast Freeze
1994
Dreams End | For Reg | Ice Strike
1993
Spinning | Jungle Knife | Pontynyswen
1992
Bitofabanter | Castle Secret | Flakey Dove
1991
Winnie The Witch | Bounden Duty | Midfielder

1990-1988
1990
Sybillin | Windbound Lass | Vestris Abu
1989
State Jester | Phils Pride | Jimbalou
1988
Past Glories | Cashew King | Beldale Star

The Swinton Handicap Hurdle is a Grade 3 National Hunt hurdle race in Great Britain which is open to horses aged four years or older. It is run at Haydock Park over a distance of about 1 mile 7½ furlongs (1 miles, 7 furlongs and 144 yards or 3,149 metres), and during its running there are nine hurdles to be jumped. It is a handicap race, and it is scheduled to take place each year in May.

The event was established in 1978, and it was initially sponsored by Royal Doulton. The winner of the inaugural race collected just over £20,000, making it the fourth most lucrative prize behind the Grand National, Cheltenham Gold Cup and Champion Hurdle. Subsequent sponsors have included Swinton Insurance (1985–93), Crowther and Merewood Homes (1994–2003), Betfred (2006–07) and Totesport (2008–11). The present sponsors, Pertemps, began supporting the race in 2012. The Swinton Handicap Hurdle takes place at a meeting which features both jump and flat racing, and outside of the main National Hunt season (October-April), is the highest graded race in the calendar.

== Records ==
Most successful horses (2 wins):

- Dreams End – 1994, 1997
- Eradicate – 2010, 2011

Leading jockeys (2 wins):

- Andy Turnell – Beacon Light (1979), Secret Ballot (1982)
- David Bridgwater – Winnie the Witch (1991), Tragic Hero (1996)
- Graham Lee – Coat of Honour (2005), Blue Bajan (2008)
- Paul Moloney – Barizan (2013), Ballyglasheen (2014)
- Adam Wedge - Silver Streak (2018), Black Poppy (2023)

Leading trainers (4 wins):

- Martin Pipe – Corporal Clinger (1985), Tragic Hero (1996), Rainbow Frontier (1998), Acambo (2006)
- Evan Williams - Barizan (2013), Ballyglasheen (2014), John Constable (2017), Silver Streak (2018)

== Winners ==
- Weights given in stones and pounds.

| Year | Winner | Age | Weight | Jockey | Trainer |
|---|---|---|---|---|---|
| 1978 | Royal Gaye | 5 | 10-00 | Colin Tinkler | Fred Rimell |
| 1979 | Beacon Light | 8 | 11-01 | Andrew Turnell | Bob Turnell |
| 1980 | No Bombs | 5 | 10-09 | Jonjo O'Neill | Peter Easterby |
| 1981 | Gaye Chance | 6 | 10–10 | Sam Morshead | Fred Rimell |
| 1982 | Secret Ballot | 8 | 10-03 | Andrew Turnell | Bob Turnell |
| 1983 | Abandoned due to waterlogging |
| 1984 | Bajan Sunshine | 5 | 10–13 | Peter Scudamore | Martin Tate |
| 1985 | Corporal Clinger | 6 | 10-03 | Paul Leach | Martin Pipe |
| 1986 | Prideaux Boy | 8 | 11-02 | Michael Bowlby | Graham Roach |
| 1987 | Inlander | 6 | 10-08 | Steve Smith Eccles | Reg Akehurst |
| 1988 | Past Glories | 5 | 11-09 | Paddy Farrell | Bill Elsey |
| 1989 | State Jester | 6 | 10-00 | John Quinn | Bill Elsey |
| 1990 | Sybillin | 4 | 10-01 | Derek Byrne | Jimmy FitzGerald |
| 1991 | Winnie the Witch | 7 | 10-02 | David Bridgwater | Ken Bridgwater |
| 1992 | Bitofabanter | 5 | 11-01 | Tom Taaffe | Arthur Moore |
| 1993 | Spinning | 6 | 11–00 | Jimmy Frost | Ian Balding |
| 1994 | Dreams End | 6 | 11–04 | Michael Hourigan, Jr. | Philip Hobbs |
| 1995 | Chief Minister | 6 | 11-06 | Peter Hobbs | Thomas Dyer |
| 1996 | Tragic Hero | 4 | 10-09 | David Bridgwater | Martin Pipe |
| 1997 | Dreams End | 9 | 11–11 | Leighton Aspell | Peter Bowen |
| 1998 | Rainbow Frontier | 4 | 10-00 | Charlie Swan | Martin Pipe |
| 1999 | She's Our Mare | 6 | 10-00 | David Casey | Tony Martin |
| 2000 | Mirjan | 4 | 10-06 | Tony Dobbin | Len Lungo |
| 2001 | Milligan | 6 | 11-04 | Norman Williamson | Venetia Williams |
| 2002 | Intersky Falcon | 5 | 11–10 | Liam Cooper | Jonjo O'Neill |
| 2003 | Altay | 6 | 09-11 | Padge Whelan | Richard Fahey |
| 2004 | Macs Joy | 5 | 10-00 | Timmy Murphy | Jessica Harrington |
| 2005 | Coat of Honour | 5 | 10-00 | Graham Lee | Howard Johnson |
| 2006 | Acambo | 5 | 10-04 | Andrew Glassonbury | Martin Pipe |
| 2007 | Leslingtaylor | 5 | 09-11 | Dougie Costello | John Quinn |
| 2008 | Blue Bajan | 6 | 10-08 | Graham Lee | Andrew Turnell |
| 2009 | Joe Jo Star | 7 | 11-00 | Brian Hughes | Richard Fahey |
| 2010 | Eradicate | 6 | 10-01 | David Bass | Nicky Henderson |
| 2011 | Eradicate | 7 | 11-05 | Jeremiah McGrath | Nicky Henderson |
| 2012 | Red Merlin | 7 | 11-03 | Jason Maguire | Donald McCain, Jr. |
| 2013 | Barizan | 7 | 10-06 | Paul Moloney | Evan Williams |
| 2014 | Ballyglasheen | 4 | 10–10 | Paul Moloney | Evan Williams |
| 2015 | War Sound | 6 | 10-06 | Ciaran Gethings | Philip Hobbs |
| 2016 | Gwafa | 5 | 11-00 | Richie McLernon | Paul Webber |
| 2017 | John Constable | 6 | 11-02 | Davy Russell | Evan Williams |
| 2018 | Silver Streak | 5 | 10-02 | Adam Wedge | Evan Williams |
| 2019 | Le Patriote | 7 | 11-12 | Sam Twiston-Davies | Richard Newland |
| | no race 2020 (Note: The 2020 running was cancelled because of the COVID-19 pandemic in the United Kingdom) |
| 2021 | Copperless | 6 | 10-04 | Aidan Coleman | Olly Murphy |
| 2022 | N'golo | 7 | 10-09 | Gavin Sheehan | Ann Duffield |
| 2023 | Black Poppy | 7 | 10-05 | Adam Wedge | Kerry Lee |
| 2024 | Pickanumber | 6 | 10–07 | Dylan Johnston | Olly Murphy |
| 2025 | Our Champ | 7 | 11–08 | Freddie Gordon | Chris Gordon |
| 2026 | Moon Chime | 8 | 10-13 | Nick Slatter | David Killahena & Graeme McPherson |

== See also ==
- Horse racing in Great Britain
- List of British National Hunt races
