= Fairy Bridge Stakes =

Flat horse race in Ireland

- Class: Group 3
- Location: Tipperary Racecourse; County Tipperary, Ireland
- Inaugurated: 2003
- Race type: Flat / Thoroughbred
- Sponsor: Coolmore Stud
- Website: Tipperary

Race information
- Distance: 7f 100y (1,500 metres)
- Surface: Turf
- Track: Left-handed
- Qualification: Three-years-old and up fillies and mares
- Weight: 9 st 2 lb (3yo); 9 st 7 lb (4yo+); Penalties; 7 lb for G1 winners * 5 lb for G2 winners / 2 G3 wins * 3 lb for G3 winners * * since 1 January
- Purse: €55,000 (2022); 1st: €32,450

Fairy Bridge Stakes
2025
Princess Child	Queen Of Thunder	Fingerpaint

Previous years
2024
Without Words	Matilda Picotte	Super Sox
2023
Clever And Cool	Matilda Picotte	Miramis
2022
Agartha	Night Of Romance	Spring Feeling
2021
Pearls Galore	Roca Roma	Loch Lein

2020-2011
2020
Champers Elysees	Pearls Galore	Parent's Prayer
2019
Waitingfortheday	Skitter Scatter	Hells Babe
2018
One Master	Dan's Dream	Ship Of Dreams
2017
Realtra	Drumfad Bay	Music Box
2016
Tanaza	Creggs Pipes	Lina De Vega
2015
Tested	Military Angel	Calypso Beat
2014
Tested	Some Spirit	Wannabe Better
2013
Fiesolana	Sea Siren	Rasmeyaa
2012
Lady Wingshot	Yellow Rosebud	Boastful
2011
Alanza	Anam Allta	Claiomh Solais

2010-2003
2010
Fourpenny Lane	Blaze Brightly	Intapeace
2009
Choose Me	Pollen	Totally Devoted
2008
Psalm	Sharleez	Kyniska
2007
Anna's Rock	Grecian Dancer	Crossing
2006
Modeeroch	Cheyenne Star	Ugo Fire
2005
Fairy Of The Night	Homegrown	Society Hostess
2004
Queen Of Palms	Fearn Royal	Amourallis
2003
Plume Rouge	Perfect Touch	Triple Gold

The Fairy Bridge Stakes is a Group 3 flat horse race in Ireland open to thoroughbred fillies and mares aged three years or older. It is run at Tipperary over a distance of 7 furlongs and 100 yards (1,500 metres), and it is scheduled to take place each year in August.

The event is named after Fairy Bridge, the dam of the successful sire Sadler's Wells. It was established in 2003, and it was initially classed at Listed level.

The Fairy Bridge Stakes was promoted to Group 3 status in 2012.

== Records ==
Most successful horse (2 wins):

- Tested - 2014, 2015

Leading jockey (3 wins):

- Kevin Manning – Modeeroch (2006), Anna's Rock (2007), Lady Wingshot (2012)
- Pat Smullen - Tested (2014, 2015), Tanaza (2016)
- Declan McDonogh - Plume Rouge (2003), Choose Me (2009), Agartha (2022)

Leading trainer (4 wins):

- Jim Bolger – Modeeroch (2006), Anna's Rock (2007), Lady Wingshot (2012), Clever And Cool (2023)
- Joseph O'Brien - Waitingfortheday (2019), Agartha (2022), Without Words (2024), Princess Child (2025)

== Winners ==
Year	Winner	Age	Jockey	Trainer	Time
2003	Plume Rouge	3	Declan McDonogh	Kevin Prendergast	1:34.60
2004	Queen of Palms	3	Pat Shanahan	Kevin Prendergast	1:40.50
2005	Fairy of the Night	3	Fran Berry	John Oxx	1:36.60
2006	Modeeroch	3	Kevin Manning	Jim Bolger	1:32.80
2007	Anna's Rock	3	Kevin Manning	Jim Bolger	1:33.37
2008	Psalm	3	Johnny Murtagh	Aidan O'Brien	1:38.55
2009	Choose Me	3	Declan McDonogh	Kevin Prendergast	1:41.17
2010	Fourpenny Lane	5	Rory Cleary	Joanna Morgan	1:31.31
2011	Alanza	3	Johnny Murtagh	John Oxx	1:32.71
2012	Lady Wingshot	3	Kevin Manning	Jim Bolger	1:38.16
2013	Fiesolana	4	Billy Lee	Willie McCreery	1:32.35
2014	Tested	3	Pat Smullen	Dermot Weld	1:34.28
2015	Tested	4	Pat Smullen	Dermot Weld	1:38.90
2016	Tanaza	3	Pat Smullen	Dermot Weld	1:36.27
2017	Realtra	5	Colin Keane	Roger Varian	1:36.95
2018	One Master	4	Colm O'Donoghue	William Haggas	1:34.60
2019	Waitingfortheday	4	Donnacha O'Brien	Joseph O'Brien	1:35.17
2020	Champers Elysees (Note: The 2020 race was run at Gowran Park after the original Tipperary fixture was abandoned due to waterlogging)	3	Niall McCullagh	Johnny Murtagh	1:36.40
2021	Pearls Galore	4	Billy Lee	Paddy Twomey	1:36.61
2022	Agartha	3	Declan McDonogh	Joseph O'Brien	1:34.62
2023	Clever And Cool	3	Rory Cleary	Jim Bolger	1:38.28
2024	Without Words	3	Mikey Sheehy	Joseph O'Brien	1:34.82
2025	Princess Child	4	Dylan Browne McMonagle	Joseph O'Brien	1:40.38
2026	Magny Cours	3	Ben Coen	Daniel McLoughlin	1:24.67

== See also ==
- Horse racing in Ireland
- List of Irish flat horse races
