= City of Troy (horse) =

American-bred Thoroughbred racehorse

- Sire: Justify
- Grandsire: Scat Daddy
- Dam: Together Forever
- Damsire: Galileo
- Sex: Colt
- Foaled: 7 March 2021
- Country: United States
- Colour: Bay
- Breeder: Orpendale, Chelston & Wynatt
- Owner: Susan Magnier, Michael Tabor & Derrick Smith
- Trainer: Aidan O'Brien
- Record: 8: 6 - 0 - 0
- Earnings: £2,493,850

Major wins
- Superlative Stakes (2023); Dewhurst Stakes (2023); Epsom Derby (2024); Eclipse Stakes (2024); International Stakes (2024)

Awards
- Cartier Champion Two-year-old Colt (2023); Cartier Champion Three-year-old Colt (2024); Cartier Horse of the Year (2024); Timeform rating: 130
- Last updated on 4 February 2025

City of Troy (foaled 7 March 2021) is an American-bred, Irish-trained Thoroughbred racehorse. He was the top-rated two-year-old colt in Europe in 2023 when he was unbeaten in three races including the Superlative Stakes and the Dewhurst Stakes. As a three-year-old he finished unplaced in the 2000 Guineas before returning to form to win the Epsom Derby. He went on to defeat older horses in the Coral-Eclipse and the Juddmonte International Stakes. The colt was joint winner of the World's Best Racehorse award in 2024.

== Background ==
City of Troy is a bay colt with a white star bred in Kentucky by Orpendale, Chelston & Wynatt, breeding companies associated with the Coolmore Stud organisation. The colt was sent into training with Aidan O'Brien at Ballydoyle. Like many Coolmore horses, he raced for the partnership of Derrick Smith, Michael Tabor and Susan Magnier.

He was from the second crop of foals sired by Justify who won the American Triple Crown in 2018. Justify's other foals have included Just F Y I and Opera Singer (Nassau Stakes).

City of Troy's dam Together Forever was a high-class racehorse who won the Fillies' Mile in 2014. Her dam Green Room an unraced daughter of the Breeders' Cup Turf winner Theatrical and had previously produced Lord Shanakill, a horse whose wins included the Mill Reef Stakes, Prix Jean Prat and Lennox Stakes. Green Room's dam Chain Fern was full-sister of the leading racehorse and broodmare Al Bahathri.

== Racing career ==
=== 2023: two-year-old season ===
City of Troy was ridden in all three of his races as a two-year-old by Ryan Moore. The colt began his racing career in a seven furlong maiden race on good ground at the Curragh on 1 July when he started the 6/4 favourite in a thirteen-runner field. He disputed the lead from the start, gained a clear advantage approaching the final furlong and won by two and a half lengths from Galen. Two weeks later the colt was stepped up in class and sent to England to contest the Group 2 Superlative Stakes over the same distance at Newmarket Racecourse and went off the 4/6 favourite against eight opponents. After tracking the leaders in the early stages he went to the front two furlongs from the finish and drew away to win by six and a half lengths in "impressive" style. After the race Aidan O'Brien said "He's unusual. Very unusual... He has an unbelievable rhythm and an unbelievable mind. He floats effortlessly".

After a three-month break, City of Troy returned to Newmarket for the Group 1 Dewhurst Stakes over seven furlongs on soft ground. He was not expected to be suited by the conditions, having been withdrawn from the National Stakes in September on account of the soft going, but was nevertheless made the 8/15 favourite, with the best fancied of his seven opponents being the Champagne Stakes winner Iberian and the Somerville Tattersall Stakes winner Alyanaabi. City of Troy led from the start, went clear inside the final furlong, and came home three and a half lengths ahead of Alyanaabi. After the race Michael Tabor compared the horse to Frankel while O'Brien commented "You needed tractor tyres to go in that [soft ground] today and he hasn't got tractor tyres, but what he has got is a jet engine. So his engine just pushed him through. An incredible horse, really. The best two-year-old I have ever trained, certainly."

In December 2023, City of Troy was named the best Two-year-old colt of the year at the Cartier Racing Awards. In the official classification of European juveniles for 2023, City of Troy was given a rating of 125, making him the best two-year-old of the season, five pounds clear of the Phoenix Stakes winner Bucanero Fuerte.

=== 2024: three-year-old season ===
On his three-year-old debut, City of Troy was made 4/6 favourite for the 2000 Guineas over the Rowley Mile at Newmarket on 4 May. He tracked the leaders in the early stages but faded badly in the last quarter mile and came home ninth of the eleven runners behind Notable Speech, beaten more than sixteen lengths by the winner. O'Brien explained "He got upset in the stalls before, which he never did before, then he jumped and Ryan just said the pace was on and he was in the middle of the pace and he just flattened on his first run."

In the 245th running of the Epsom Derby on 1 June, City of Troy, with Moore in the saddle, was made the 3/1 favourite in a field of sixteen three-year-old colts. The other fancied contenders included Ambiente Friendly (Lingfield Derby Trial), Ancient Wisdom (Futurity Trophy), Los Angeles (Leopardstown Derby Trial) and Dancing Gemini (second in the Poule d'Essai des Poulains). In a change of tactics Moore settled the colt towards the rear of the field as his stablemate Euphoric set the pace. After briefly struggling to obtain a clear run, the colt was switched to the inside approaching the final turn and began to make rapid progress. He gained the lead from Los Angeles two furlongs out and won "comfortably" by two and three quarter lengths from Ambiente Friendly with a gap of three and a quarter lengths back to Los Angeles in third. When asked if the colt was the best of his ten Derby winners O'Brien responded "No doubt! Because he has the cruise, he has the balance, he quickens and he stays. I don't think there's any doubt about that. Ryan gave him an incredible ride and I'm so grateful to everyone for the work they have done. We knew the Guineas was totally wrong and I made mistakes training him, that's the bottom line."

On 6 July City of Troy was brought back in distance and matched against older horses for the first time to contest the Eclipse Stakes over ten furlongs on soft ground at Sandown Park. The opposition was not particularly strong and he started the 1/4 favourite with the best of his five rivals appearing to be Dancing Gemini and the four-year-old Al Riffa, who had not won since taking the National Stakes in 2022. After tracking his stablemate Hans Andersen for most of the way he took the lead in the straight but came under strong pressure in the closing stages before prevailing by a length from Al Riffa. Ryan Moore said "the ground is slower than what he wants... he just wasn't comfortable... I wasn't happy but he found enough to get it done".

In the International Stakes over ten and a half furlongs at York Racecourse on 21 August City of Troy started the 5/4 favourite in a thirteen-runner field. His opponents on this occasion included Ambiente Friendly, Bluestocking (Pretty Polly Stakes), Calandagan (King Edward VII Stakes) and Durezza (Kikuka Sho). Moore sent the colt into the lead from the start and City of Troy maintained his advantage throughout the race, repelling a strong late challenge from Calandagan to win by a length in a record time of 2:04.32. After the race O'Brien suggested that the colt could be aimed at the Breeders' Cup Classic on dirt and commented "It wasn’t the plan today [to make the running] but he hit the gates and Ryan just decided he was going along...People will measure his stride but the length of it in the last two furlongs is incredible really. He just keeps going and Ryan said he went through the line very strong. Everything he did from the day we trained him, he was just the best."

On 20 November City of Troy claimed the 34th Cartier Horse of the Year accolade, as the second horse after Frankel to be crowned the achievement.

On 6 December City of Troy was voted World Pool Moment of the Year for his G1 Derby win at Epsom. Aidan O'Brien and his groom, David Hickey, received the commemorative plaque and £4,000 prize, respectively.

== Statistics ==
Date	Distance	Race	Grade/ Group	Track	Odds	Field	Finish	Winning Time	Winning (Losing) Margin	Jockey	Ref
2023 – two-year-old season
1 Jul 2023	7 furlongs	Maiden		The Curragh	6/4*	13	1	1:23.96	2 1/2 lengths	Ryan Moore	
15 Jul 2023	7 furlongs	Superlative Stakes	II	Newmarket	4/6*	9	1	1:26.03	6 1/2 lengths	Ryan Moore	
14 Oct 2023	7 furlongs	Dewhurst Stakes	I	Newmarket	8/15*	8	1	1:24.85	3 1/2 lengths	Ryan Moore	
2024 – three-year-old season
4 May 2024	1 mile	2000 Guineas	I	Newmarket	4/6*	11	9	1:37.21	(16 3/4 lengths)	Ryan Moore	
1 Jun 2024	1m 4f 6y	Epsom Derby	I	Epsom Downs	3/1*	16	1	2:38.32	2 3/4 lengths	Ryan Moore	
6 Jul 2024	1m 1f 209y	Coral-Eclipse	I	Sandown Park	1/4*	6	1	2:09.80	1 length	Ryan Moore	
21 Aug 2024	1m 2f 56y	Juddmonte International	I	York	5/4*	13	1	2:04.32	1 length	Ryan Moore	
2 Nov 2024	1 1/4 miles	Breeders' Cup Classic	I	Del Mar	3.90	14	8	2:00.78	(12 3/4 lengths)	Ryan Moore	

Notes:
An (*) asterisk after the odds means City Of Troy was the post-time favourite.

== Pedigree ==
Pedigree of City of Troy (USA), bay colt, 2021
Sire Justify (USA) 2015	Scat Daddy (USA); 2004	Johannesburg	Hennessy
Sire Justify (USA) 2015	Scat Daddy (USA); 2004	Johannesburg	Myth
Sire Justify (USA) 2015	Scat Daddy (USA); 2004	Love Style	Mr Prospector
Sire Justify (USA) 2015	Scat Daddy (USA); 2004	Love Style	Likeable Style
Sire Justify (USA) 2015	Stage Magic (USA); 2007	Ghostzapper	Awesome Again (CAN)
Sire Justify (USA) 2015	Stage Magic (USA); 2007	Ghostzapper	Baby Zip
Sire Justify (USA) 2015	Stage Magic (USA); 2007	Magical Illusion	Pulpit
Sire Justify (USA) 2015	Stage Magic (USA); 2007	Magical Illusion	Voodoo Lily
Dam Together Forever (IRE) 2005	Galileo (IRE); 1998	Sadler's Wells (USA)	Northern Dancer (CAN)
Dam Together Forever (IRE) 2005	Galileo (IRE); 1998	Sadler's Wells (USA)	Fairy Bridge
Dam Together Forever (IRE) 2005	Galileo (IRE); 1998	Urban Sea (USA)	Miswaki
Dam Together Forever (IRE) 2005	Galileo (IRE); 1998	Urban Sea (USA)	Allegretta (GB)
Dam Together Forever (IRE) 2005	Green Room (USA); 2002	Theatrical (IRE)	Nureyev (USA)
Dam Together Forever (IRE) 2005	Green Room (USA); 2002	Theatrical (IRE)	Tree of Knowledge
Dam Together Forever (IRE) 2005	Green Room (USA); 2002	Chain Fern	Blushing Groom (FR)
Dam Together Forever (IRE) 2005	Green Room (USA); 2002	Chain Fern	Chain Store (Family 9-e)

- City of Troy is a full brother to Hong Kong G3 placed and handicap London Gold Cup winner Unbelievable.
