= Peaceful (horse) =

Irish Thoroughbred racehorse

- Racing silks of Michael Tabor
- Sire: Galileo
- Grandsire: Sadler's Wells
- Dam: Missvinski
- Damsire: Stravinsky
- Sex: Filly
- Foaled: 22 January 2017
- Country: Ireland
- Colour: Brown
- Breeder: Coolmore Stud
- Owner: Susan Magnier, Michael Tabor & Derrick Smith
- Trainer: Aidan O'Brien
- Record: 8: 2-2-1
- Earnings: £233,572

Major wins
- Irish 1,000 Guineas (2020)

Peaceful (foaled 22 January 2017) is an Irish Thoroughbred racehorse. She showed some promise in three starts as a juvenile in 2019 when she won one minor race and was narrowly beaten in the Montrose Stakes. On her first run as a three-year-old she won the Irish 1,000 Guineas. She later finished third in the Prix de Diane and second in the Matron Stakes.

== Background ==
Peaceful is a brown filly with a prominent white star bred in Ireland by the Coolmore Stud. She is owned by the Coolmore partners Michael Tabor, Susan Magnier and Derrick Smith. Like many Coolmore horses she was sent into training with Aidan O'Brien at Ballydoyle.

She was from the fifteenth crop of foals sired by Galileo, who won the Derby, Irish Derby and King George VI and Queen Elizabeth Stakes in 2001. Galileo became one of the world's leading stallions, earning his tenth champion sire of Great Britain and Ireland title in 2018. His other progeny include Frankel, Nathaniel, New Approach, Rip Van Winkle, Found Minding and Ruler of the World. Peaceful's dam Missvinski showed good racing ability, winning four times in France including two Listed races and finishing second in the Prix d'Astarte. She was a great-granddaughter of Careless Notion, the dam of Cacoethes and the Santa Susana Stakes winner Fabulous Notion.

== Racing career ==
=== 2019: two-year-old season ===
Peaceful was ridden by Seamie Heffernan when she made her track debut in a seven furlong maiden race at Leopardstown Racecourse on 15 August and started at odds of 10/1. After becoming upset in the starting stalls she was never in serious contention, and came home ninth of the fourteen runners, three and three quarter lengths behind the winner Ridenza. On 10 October the filly was partnered by the trainer's son Donnacha O'Brien when she started the 8/11 favourite for a maiden over one mile at Thurles Racecourse and recorded her first success as took the lead two furlongs from the finish and drew away to win by seven lengths from Indian Lilac. For her final run of the season Peaceful was sent to England to contest the Listed Montrose Stakes on heavy ground at Newmarket Racecourse on 2 November and started the 3/1 favourite in a seven-runner field. With Donnacha O'Brien in the saddle she was among the leaders from the start and kept on well in the closing stages to finish second, beaten a neck by the 20/1 outsider Born With Pride.

=== 2020: three-year-old season ===
The flat racing season in Ireland was disrupted by the COVID-19 pandemic and the Irish 1000 Guineas was run three weeks later than usual on 13 June behind closed doors at the Curragh. Ridden by Heffernan, Peaceful started the 3/1 second favourite behind Albigna in an eleven-runner field which also included So Wonderful (third in the Moyglare Stud Stakes), Fancy Blue and New York Girl (Weld Park Stakes). Peaceful settled in second place behind the outsider Valeria Messalina before gaining the advantage a furlong and a half from the finish and stayed on well to win by two lengths and a head from Fancy Blue and So Wonderful. After the race Aidan O'Brien said "Seamus has been delighted with her all the time. He rides her in all her work. Everything has gone very smooth with her. She will get further than a mile so a mile here on beautiful ground really suited her... She's a lovely filly."

On 5 July Peaceful was sent to France to contest the Prix de Diane over 2000 metres at Chantilly Racecourse in which she was ridden by Heffernan and went off the 3.9/1 second choice in the betting behind Alpine Star. After racing in mid-division she briefly struggled to obtain a clear run before finishing strongly to take third place, beaten a short neck and a head by Fancy Blue and Alpine Star. At Leopardstown in September she started at odds of 11/4 for the Matron Stakes over one mile and briefly took the lead in the closing stages before being overtaken and beaten into second place by Champers Elysees. In October the filly was sent to Newmarket for the Sun Chariot Stakes but was reportedly unsuited by the heavy ground and finished last of the twelve runners behind Nazeef, beaten twenty-seven lengths by the winner. For her final run of the year Peaceful was sent to the United States to contest the Breeders' Cup Filly & Mare Turf at Keeneland on 7 November but made little impact, coming home eleventh of the thirteen finishers behind Audarya.

== Pedigree ==
Pedigree of Peaceful (IRE), brown filly, 2017
Sire Galileo (IRE) 1998	Sadler's Wells (USA); 1981	Northern Dancer (CAN)	Nearctic
Sire Galileo (IRE) 1998	Sadler's Wells (USA); 1981	Northern Dancer (CAN)	Natalma (USA)
Sire Galileo (IRE) 1998	Sadler's Wells (USA); 1981	Fairy Bridge	Bold Reason
Sire Galileo (IRE) 1998	Sadler's Wells (USA); 1981	Fairy Bridge	Special
Sire Galileo (IRE) 1998	Urban Sea (USA) ch. 1989	Miswaki	Mr. Prospector
Sire Galileo (IRE) 1998	Urban Sea (USA) ch. 1989	Miswaki	Hopespringseternal
Sire Galileo (IRE) 1998	Urban Sea (USA) ch. 1989	Allegretta (GB)	Lombard (GER)
Sire Galileo (IRE) 1998	Urban Sea (USA) ch. 1989	Allegretta (GB)	Anatevka (GER)
Dam Missvinski (USA) 2004	Stravinsky (USA); 1996	Nureyev	Northern Dancer (CAN)
Dam Missvinski (USA) 2004	Stravinsky (USA); 1996	Nureyev	Special
Dam Missvinski (USA) 2004	Stravinsky (USA); 1996	Fire The Groom	Blushing Groom (FR)
Dam Missvinski (USA) 2004	Stravinsky (USA); 1996	Fire The Groom	Prospector's Fire
Dam Missvinski (USA) 2004	Miss U Fran (USA); 1998	Brocco	Kris S
Dam Missvinski (USA) 2004	Miss U Fran (USA); 1998	Brocco	Anytime Ms
Dam Missvinski (USA) 2004	Miss U Fran (USA); 1998	Careless Aly	Alydar
Dam Missvinski (USA) 2004	Miss U Fran (USA); 1998	Careless Aly	Careless Notion (Family 2-e)

- Peaceful is inbred 3 × 4 to Northern Dancer, meaning that this stallion appears in both the third and fourth generations of her pedigree. She is also inbred 4 × 4 to the broodmare Special.
