= Concorde Stakes (Ireland) =

Flat horse race in Ireland

- Class: Listed
- Location: Tipperary Racecourse; County Tipperary, Ireland
- Race type: Flat / Thoroughbred
- Sponsor: Coolmore Stud
- Website: Tipperary

Race information
- Distance: 7f 100y (1,500 metres)
- Surface: Turf
- Track: Left-handed
- Qualification: Three-years-old and up
- Weight: 9 st 3 lb (3yo); 9 st 5 lb (4yo+); Allowances; 3 lb for fillies and mares Penalties; 7 lb for Group 1 winners * 5 lb for Group 2 winners * 5 lb if two Group 3 wins * 3 lb if one Group 3 win * * since 1 January
- Purse: €55,000 (2020); 1st: €32,450

Concorde Stakes
2025
Deepone	Lord Massusus	Soft Winds

Previous years
2024
Power Under Me	Fleur De Chine	Mexicali Rose
2023
Snapraeterea	Bells On Her Toes	Statement
2022
Statement	Current Option	Prettiest
2021
Maker Of Kings	Carrytheone	Laughifuwant

2020-2011
2020
Current Option	Laughifuwant	Soul Search
2019
Yulong Gold Fairy	Imaging	Crafty Madam
2018
Yulong Gold Fairy	Smash Williams	Flight Risk
2017
Psychedelic Funk	Downforce	Spanish Tenor
2016
Jet Setting	Joailliere	Sruthan
2015
Sovereign Debt	Tested	Steip Amach
2014
Big Break	Brendan Brackan	Sruthan
2013
Sruthan	Big Break	Fort Knox
2012
Yellow Rosebud	Lady Wingshot	Coolnagree
2011
Anam Allta	Bay Knight	Across The Rhine

2010-2001
2010
Emulous	Keredari	Air Chief Marshal
2009
Duff	Dohasa	Three Rocks
2008
Psalm	Jumbajukiba	Hard Rock City
2007
Eastern Appeal	Excelerate	King Jock
2006
Noelani	Ugo Fire	Hurricane Cat
2005
Miss Sally	Common World	Mustameet
2004
Hamairi	Fearn Royal	Poetical
2003
Sheppard's Watch	Latino Magic	Perfect Touch
2002
Marionnaud	Patsy's Double	D'Anjou
2001
Montecastillo	Toroca	Gaelic Queen

2000-1991
2000
Bernstein	Cobourg Lodge	Conormara
1999
Tarry Flynn	Late Night Out	Oyster Catcher
1998
Two-Twenty-Two	Hasanat	Cool Edge
1997
Wizard King	Orange Grouse	Azra
1996
Wizard King	Cool Edge	Idris
1995
Wild Bluebell	Wizard King	Mediation
1994
Heart Lake	Unusual Heat	Bradawn Breever
1993
Pernilla	Dashing Colours	Street Rebel
1992
Rami	Poolesta	Malvernico
1991
Mr Brooks	Arany	Prudent Manner

1990-1988
1989
Executive Perk	Corwyn Bay	Noora Abu
1988
From The Wood	Lord Bud	Demon Magic

The Concorde Stakes is a Listed flat horse race in Ireland open to thoroughbreds aged three years or older. It is run at Tipperary over a distance of 7 furlongs and 100 yards (1,500 metres), and it is scheduled to take place each year in early October.

== History ==
The event was formerly contested at Phoenix Park over a distance of 1 mile. For a period it was held in June or July. It was transferred to Tipperary in 1991, and moved to early October in 1995. It was staged at Cork in 1999 and 2000.

The Concorde Stakes currently takes place at a meeting which features both flat and jump races. It is run on the same afternoon as the Istabraq Hurdle.

== Records ==
Most successful horse since 1983 (2 wins):

- Kings River – 1985, 1986
- Wizard King – 1996, 1997
- Yulong Gold Fairy - 2018,2019

Leading jockey since 1983 (5 wins):

- Michael Kinane – Kings River (1985, 1986), Executive Perk (1989), Rami (1992), Eastern Appeal (2007)

Leading trainer since 1983 (11 wins):

- Dermot Weld – Iron Leader (1983), Kings River (1985, 1986), Executive Perk (1989), Rami (1992), Two-Twenty-Two (1998), Tarry Flynn (1999), Emulous (2010), Anam Allta (2011), Yellow Rosebud (2012), Big Break (2013)

== Winners since 1983 ==
Year	Winner	Age	Jockey	Trainer	Time
1983	Iron Leader	3	Darrel McHargue	Dermot Weld
1984	Argosy	3	Pat Eddery	Vincent O'Brien
1985	Kings River	3	Michael Kinane	Dermot Weld	1:53.10
1986	Kings River	4	Michael Kinane	Dermot Weld	1:36.90
1987	Stately Don	3	Christy Roche	David O'Brien	1:39.10
1988	From the Wood	3	David Parnell	Kevin Prendergast	1:44.98
1989	Executive Perk	4	Michael Kinane	Dermot Weld	1:35.10
1990	Esprit d'Etoile	5	Declan Gillespie	Vincent O'Brien	1:39.10
1991	Mr Brooks	4	Pat Shanahan	Kevin Connolly	1:35.00
1992	Rami	5	Michael Kinane	Dermot Weld	1:24.40
1993	Pernilla	3	Christy Roche	Jim Bolger	1:45.20
1994	Heart Lake	3	Johnny Murtagh	John Oxx	1:34.40
1995	Wild Bluebell	3	Seamie Heffernan	Jim Bolger	1:32.90
1996	Wizard King	5	George Duffield	Sir Mark Prescott	1:32.80
1997	Wizard King	6	George Duffield	Sir Mark Prescott	1:33.90
1998	Two-Twenty-Two	3	Pat Smullen	Dermot Weld	1:38.50
1999	Tarry Flynn	5	Pat Smullen	Dermot Weld	1:29.90
2000	Bernstein	3	Seamie Heffernan	Aidan O'Brien	1:30.00
2001	Montecastillo	4	Tadhg O'Shea	Charles O'Brien	1:41.00
2002	Marionnaud	3	Wayne Smith	Jim Bolger	1:31.80
2003	Sheppard's Watch	5	John Egan	Geoff Wragg	1:34.40
2004	Hamairi	3	Tadhg O'Shea	John Oxx	1:43.50
2005	Miss Sally	3	Rory Cleary	Michael Halford	1:40.40
2006	Noelani	4	Fran Berry	John Oxx	1:39.30
2007	Eastern Appeal	4	Michael Kinane	Michael Halford	1:35.49
2008	Psalm	3	Sean Levey	Aidan O'Brien	1:39.48
2009	Duff	6	Fran Berry	Edward Lynam	1:31.89
2010	Emulous	3	Pat Smullen	Dermot Weld	1:37.38
2011	Anam Allta	3	Declan McDonogh	Dermot Weld	1:42.14
2012	Yellow Rosebud	3	Pat Smullen	Dermot Weld	1:46.40
2013	Sruthan	3	Chris Hayes	Paul Deegan	1:36.32
2014	Big Break	4	Leigh Roche	Dermot Weld	1:36.82
2015	Sovereign Debt (Note: Tested finished first in 2015 but was disqualified following a stewards' enquiry)	6	Declan McDonogh	David Nicholls	1:35.12
2016	Jet Setting	3	Shane Foley	Adrian Paul Keatley	1:41.56
2017	Psychedelic Funk	3	Colin Keane	Ger Lyons	1:46.14
2018	Yulong Gold Fairy	3	Shane Foley	Dermot Weld	1:40.71
2019	Yulong Gold Fairy	4	Kevin Manning	Jim Bolger	1:43.45
2020	Current Option	4	Gavin Ryan	Adrian McGuinness	1:37.92
2021	Maker of Kings	4	Colin Keane	Ger Lyons	1:44.39
2022	Statement	4	Dylan Browne McMonagle	Joseph O'Brien	1:39.19
2023	Snapraeterea	5	Declan McDonogh	Joseph O'Brien	1:46.03
2024	Power Under Me	6	Colin Keane	Ger Lyons	1:41.81
2025	Deepone	4	Billy Lee	Paddy Twomey	1:42.99
2026	King Cuan	5	Billy Lee	Paddy Twomey	1:29.96

== See also ==
- Horse racing in Ireland
- List of Irish flat horse races
