= Carnarvon Stakes =

Flat horse race in Britain

Carnarvon Stakes
2026
Song of The Clyde	Albert Einstein	Havana Hurricane

Previous years
2025
Symbol Of Honour	Ides Of March	Sayidah Dariyan
2024
Elite Status	Relief Rally	Adaay In Devon
2023
Shaquille	Desert Cop	Aesop's Fables
2022
Tiber Flow	Ehraz	Sam Maximus
2021
Creative Force	Spycatcher	Tactical

2020-2011
2020
Repartee	Above	Maystar
2019
Khaadem	Oxted	Space Traveller
2018
Never Back Down	All Out	Shabaaby
2017
Visionary	Simmie	Florida Times
2016
Log Out Island	Remarkable	Buying Trouble
2015
Adaay	Jungle Cat	Salt Island
2014
Musical Comedy	Naadirr	Major Crispies
2013
Zanetto	City Girl	Ninjago
2012
Swiss Spirit	Lethal Force	Samminder
2011
Elzaam	Cape To Rio	Dinkum Diamond

2010-2001
2010
Angel's Pursuit	Society Rock	Mister Hughie
2009
Border Patrol	Triple Aspect	Awinnersgame
2008
Fat Boy	Tajdeef	Skadrak
2007
Sakhee's Secret	Fontana Amorosa	Howya Now Kid
2006
Kingsgate Prince	Assertive	Strike Up The Band
2005
Nota Bene	Andronikos	Cornus
2004
So Will I	Mac Love	Nights Cross
2003
Striking Ambition	Avonbridge	Ego
2002
Lady Links	Golden Bounty	Tudor Wood
2001
Zilch	Ceepio	Final Pursuit

2000-1991
2000
Jarn	Winning Venture	The Tatling
1999
Vision Of Night	Lionhearted	Blackheath
1998
Bold Edge	Gorse	Cortachy Castle
1997
Tomba	Referendum	Hattab
1996
Rambling Bear	Atraf	Warning Time
1995
Sergeyev	Baaderah	Overbrook
1994
Mutakddim	Redoubtable	Canaska Dancer
1993
Specified	Chaddleworth	Brockton Dancer
1992
Garah	High Sevens	Threepence
1991
Shalford	Savoyard	Dale Hill Daisy

1990-1988
1990
Tod	Dayjur	Ra'A
1989
Dancing Dissident	Silca Supreme	Paddy Chalk
1988
Blues Indigo	Peace Girl	Great Chaddington

The Carnarvon Stakes is a Listed flat horse race in Great Britain open to horses aged three years only. It is run at Newbury over a distance of 6 furlongs (1,207 metres) and is scheduled to take place each year in May.

The race was formerly known as the Hue-Williams Stakes in the 1980s and early 1990s. It attracted notable horses such as Dayjur (who was narrowly defeated by Tod in 1990), Dancing Dissident (a subsequent winner of the Group 2 Temple Stakes in its next run), and Shalford (who later won three Group 3 races over 6 furlongs). Subsequent editions of the race had various names until it was renamed the Carnarvon Stakes and elevated to Listed status in 2002.

== Winners ==
Year	Winner	Jockey	Trainer	Time
1981	What Heaven	Willie Carson	Paul Kelleway	1:14.03
1982	Jacquinta	Geoff Baxter	Bruce Hobbs	1:12.17
1983	Alawir	Richard Hills	Harry Thomson Jones	1:22.89
1984	Novello	Pat Eddery	John Winter	1:13.28
1985	Abha	Steve Cauthen	Henry Cecil	1:13.52
1986	Governor General	Greville Starkey	Les Cottrell	1:14.89
1987	Sharp Reminder	Tyrone Williams	Ray Laing	1:14.19
1988	Blues Indigo	Robert Curant	John Wharton	1:12.60
1989	Dancing Dissident	Walter Swinburn	Michael Stoute	1:10.79
1990	Tod	Richard Quinn	Jack Berry	1:12.52
1991	Shalford	Bruce Raymond	Richard Hannon Sr.	1:14.79
1992	Garah	Steve Cauthen	Henry Cecil	1:11.83
1993	Specified	Willie Carson	John Gosden	1:14.06
1994	Mutakddim	Willie Carson	John Gosden	1:11.19
1995	Sergeyev	Richard Hughes	Richard Hannon Sr.	1:13.48
1996	Rambling Bear	Ray Cochrane	Michael Blanshard	1:16.24
1997	Tomba	Kevin Darley	Brian Meehan	1:14.74
1998	Bold Edge	Dane O'Neill	Richard Hannon Sr.	1:11.56
1999	Vision Of Night	Pat Eddery	John Dunlop	1:14.95
2000	Jarn	Richard Hills	Ben Hanbury	1:14.49
2001	Zilch	Dane O'Neill	Richard Hannon Sr.	1:17.33
2002	Lady Links	Dane O'Neill	Richard Hannon Sr.	1:12.68
2003	Striking Ambition	Darryll Holland	Giles Bravery	1:11.89
2004	So Will I	Richard Hills	Marcus Tregoning	1:13.73
2005	Nota Bene	Liam Keniry	David Elsworth	1:09.42
2006	Sunny King	Richard Quinn	John Best	1:15.62
2007	Sakhee's Secret	Steve Drowne	Hughie Morrison	1:14.34
2008	Fat Boy	Richard Hughes	Peter Chapple-Hyam	1:12.86
2009	Border Patrol	Steve Drowne	Roger Charlton	1:13.49
2010	Angel's Pursuit	Richard Hughes	Richard Hannon Sr.	1:12.16
2011	Elzaam	Richard Hills	Roger Varian	1:11.68
2012	Swiss Spirit	Mickael Barzalona	David Elsworth	1:13.79
2013	Zanetto	William Buick	Andrew Balding	1:12.01
2014	Musical Comedy	Richard Hughes	Richard Hannon Jr.	1:12.14
2015	Adaay	Ryan Moore	William Haggas	1:12.33
2016	Log Out Island	James Doyle	Richard Hannon Jr.	1:12.20
2017	Visionary	Jamie Spencer	Robert Cowell	1:16.27
2018	Never Back Down	Silvestre de Sousa	Hugo Palmer	1:10.27
2019	Khaadem	James Doyle	Charles Hills	1:11.23
2020 (Note: The 2020 race was run at Windsor in June due to the COVID-19 pandemic in the United Kingdom)	Repartee	Andrea Atzeni	Kevin Ryan	1:10.20
2021	Creative Force	James Doyle	Charlie Appleby	1:15.27
2022	Tiber Flow	Tom Marquand	William Haggas	1:10.89
2023	Shaquille	James Doyle	Julie Camacho	1:10.49
2024	Elite Status	Clifford Lee	Karl Burke	1:09.68
2025	Symbol Of Honour	William Buick	Charlie Appleby	1:09.78
2026	Song Of The Clyde	Hector Crouch	Clive Cox	1:12:39

== See also ==
- Horse racing in Great Britain
- List of British flat horse races
