= Tipperary Racecourse =

Horse racing venue in Tipperary, Ireland

Coordinates: 52.502287°N 8.206336°W

Tipperary Racecourse is a horse racing venue in County Tipperary, Ireland which stages both National Hunt and Flat racing. The course is located adjacent to Limerick Junction railway station and approximately two miles from Tipperary town. Tipperary Racecourse is owned by Horse Racing Ireland. The course is left-handed and flat and measures one mile and two furlongs round. There is a five furlong sprint track which joins the main racecourse at the start of the straight.

== History ==
The first recorded racemeeting at Tipperary Races at Barronstown Course was on 27 March 1848 but at the current Limerick Junction racetrack it was September 1916 when the meeting was attended by trainers Senator J.J. Parkinson, Stephen Grehan and Charles Moore. It remained Limerick Junction until the name was changed to Tipperary in 1986.

== Notable races ==
Month	DOW	Race Name	Type	Grade	Distance	Age/Sex
August	Thursday	Fairy Bridge Stakes	Flat	Group 3	7f 100y	3yo + f
October	Sunday	Joe Mac Novice Hurdle	Hurdle	Grade 3	2m	4yo +
October	Sunday	Concorde Stakes	Flat	Group 3	7f 100y	3yo +
October	Sunday	Tipperary Hurdle	Hurdle	Grade 2	2m	4yo +
October	Sunday	Like A Butterfly Novice Chase	Chase	Grade 3	2m 4f	4yo +
