= 2018 Road to the Kentucky Derby =

Preliminary races prior to 2018 Kentucky Derby

The 2018 Road to the Kentucky Derby was a series of races through which horses qualified for the 2018 Kentucky Derby, which was held on May 5. The field for the Derby was limited to 20 horses, with up to four 'also eligibles' in case of a late withdrawal from the field. There were three separate paths for horses to take to qualify for the Derby: the main Road consisting of 34 races in North America plus one in Dubai, the Japan Road consisting of three races in Japan, and a new European Road consisting of seven races in England, Ireland and France.

The races in the Road to the Kentucky Derby were held from September 2017 (when the horses were two) through April 2018 (when they had turned three). The top four finishers in the specified races earned points, with the highest point values awarded in the major preparatory races held in late March or early April. Earnings in non-restricted stakes acted as a tie breaker.

== Changes from 2017 series ==
For 2018, several changes were made from the 2017 series:

- Race changes: Added the Springboard Mile to the main series. Added a third race to the Japan series.
- Points system changes: Jeff Ruby Steaks, formally the Spiral Stakes moved to a "Wild Card" race, along with the Lexington Stakes. Points for these races will now be awarded on 20-8-4-2 basis, which is a decrease for the Jeff Ruby and an increase for the Lexington
- Rules changes: European Road to the Kentucky Derby introduced on a similar basis to the Japan Road. Consists of seven races, four of them on the turf and three on a synthetic surface.

The Delta Downs Jackpot Stakes, which would have been the 36th race in the main series, was cancelled in the aftermath of Hurricane Harvey.

== Main Road to the Kentucky Derby ==
=== Standings ===
The following table shows the points earned in the eligible races for the main series. Entries for the Derby were taken on May 1.

Rank	Horse	Points	Eligible Earnings (Note: Earnings from non-restricted stakes prior to the running of the Kentucky Derby serve as a tie-breaker.)	Trainer	Owner	Ref
1	Magnum Moon	150	$1,140,000	Todd Pletcher	Lawana & Robert Low	
2	Good Magic	134	$1,838,400	Chad Brown	e Five Racing & Stonestreet Stables	
3	Audible	110	$803,520	Todd Pletcher	WinStar Farm, China Horse Club & SF Racing	
4	Noble Indy	110	$640,000	Todd Pletcher	WinStar Farm & Repole Stable	
5	Vino Rosso	107	$572,500	Todd Pletcher	Repole & St Elias Stables	
6	Bolt d'Oro	104	$980,000	Mick Ruis	Ruis Racing	
7	Enticed	103	$545,880	Kiaran McLaughlin	Godolphin Racing	
8	Mendelssohn	100	$1,947,299	Aidan O'Brien	Smith, Magnier & Tabor	
**9**	**Justify**	**100**	**$600,000**	**Bob Baffert**	**China Horse Club, Head of Plains Partners, WinStar Farm, Starlight Racing**	
bypassing (Note: Connections of Quip decided to bypass the race for the Preakness Stakes)	Quip	90	$412,000	Rodolphe Brisset	WinStar Farm, China Horse Club & SF Racing	
10 (Note: Late nomination fee paid was paid before March 19 for the following horses: Runaway Ghost, Flameaway, Blended Citizen, Arawak and All Out Blitz.)	Flameaway	70	$672,260	Mark Casse	John Oxley	
11	Solomini	54	$716,000	Bob Baffert	Zayat Stables	
12	Bravazo	54	$359,913	D. Wayne Lukas	Calumet Farm	
13	My Boy Jack	52	$622,000	J. Keith Desormeaux	Don't Tell My Wife and Monomoy Stables	
14	Promises Fulfilled	52	$266,480	Dale Romans	Robert Baron	
injured	Runaway Ghost	50	$456,350	Todd Fincher	Joe Peacock	
15	Free Drop Billy	44	$597,200	Dale Romans	Albaugh Family Stables	
16	Lone Sailor	42	$273,347	Thomas Amoss	Tom Benson	
bypassing (Note: Rayya is a filly who has also qualified for the Kentucky Oaks)	Rayya	40	$600,000	Doug Watson	Rashid bin Humaid al Nuaimi	
injured	McKinzie	40	$320,000	Bob Baffert	Watson, Pegram & Wellman	
17	Hofburg	40	$192,000	William I. Mott	Juddmonte Farms	
18	Firenze Fire	39	$647,500	Jason Servis	Mr. Amore Stable	
19	Combatant	32	$350,000	Steve Asmussen	Winchell Thoroughbreds & Willis Horton Racing	
20 (Note: Combatant moved into the 20th position with the withdrawal due to illness of Gronkowski on April 23)	Instilled Regard	29	$246,000	Jerry Hollendorfer	OXO Equine LLC	
injured (Note: Catholic Boy bled during the Florida Derby and was sent to recover thereby missing the Triple Crown races)	Catholic Boy	24	$378,000	Jonathan Thomas	Robert LaPenta	
bypassing	Snapper Sinclair	22	$301,810	Steve Asmussen	Bloom Racing	
21	Blended Citizen	22	$159,644	Doug O'Neill	Greg Hall & Sayjay Racing	
bypassing	Reride	20	$298,000	Steve Asmussen	Winchell Thoroughbreds	
	Strike Power	20	$209,560	Mark Hennig	Courtland Farms	
	Dream Baby Dream	20	$176,000	Steve Asmussen	Dream Baby Dream Racing Stable	
not nominated	Core Beliefs	20	$120,000	Peter Eurton	Gary Broad	
	Restoring Hope	20	$100,000	Bob Baffert	Gary and Mary West	
	Old Time Revival	20	$100,000	Kenneth Decker	Fred Brei	
	Mississippi	20	$96,000	Mark Casse	Magnier, Tabor, Oxley, Smith and Jooste	
	Peace	15	$123,000	Richard Mandella	Spendthrift Farm & Town and Country Racing	
injured	Avery Island	14	$320,000	Kiaran McLaughlin	Godolphin Racing	
	Sporting Chance	12	$337,000	D. Wayne Lukas	Robert Baker & William Mack	
	Greyvitos (Note: On 5 January 2018, Greyvitos underwent surgery after X-rays revealed small bone chips in both of his front knees. He returned to training on 26 February)	12	$310,000	Adam Kitchingman	Triple B Farms	
	Givemeaminit	12	$196,000	Thomas Amoss	Valleen Farms	
	Pony Up	12	$101,580	Todd Pletcher	Calumet Farm	
euthanized	Mourinho	11	$143,360	Bob Baffert	Phoenix Thoroughbred III	
	Gold Town	10	$251,342	Charlie Appleby	Godolphin	
not nominated	The Tabulator	10	$186,750	Larry Rivelli	Carolyn Wilson	
not nominated	Paved (Note: Paved is a filly that is not nominated for the Kentucky Derby)	10	$60,000	Michael McCarthy	Ciaglia Racing & Eclipse Thoroughbred	
	Kanthaka	10	$168,000	Jerry Hollendorfer	West Point Thoroughbreds	
	World of Trouble	10	$145,000	Jason Servis	Michael Dubb & Bethlehem Stables	
	Lombo	10	$90,345	Michael Pender	Michael Lombardi	
	Seven Trumpets	9	$80,000	Dale Romans	West Point Thoroughbreds	
	Telekinesis	8	$40,000	Mark Casse	Stonestreet Stables LLC	
	Tiz Mischief	6	$80,900	Dale Romans	Frank Jones Jr.	
	Ayacara	5	$71,345	J. Keith Desormeaux	Charles & Cynthia Marquis	
	Title Ready	5	$45,000	Steve Asmussen	Charles Fipke	
	Machismo	5	$19,200	Anthony Quartarolo	Looch Racing & Quartarolo	
not nominated	City Plan	4	$67,346	Eoin Harty	Godolphin Racing	
	Arawak	4	$63,156	Doug O'Neill (Note: Arawak was originally trained by Wesley Ward but was transferred to Doug O'Neill after finishing third in the Jeff Ruby Steaks)	3R Racing, S. Kah & C T R Stables	
	All Out Blitz	4	$56,000	Simon Callaghan	Kareem Shah, Inc.	
	Principe Guilherme	4	$44,000	Steve Asmussen	Three Chimneys Farm	
	Coltandmississippi	3	$31,137	Todd Pletcher	Teresa Viola Racing and St Elias Stable	
euthanized	Ten City	2	$83,300	Kenneth McPeek	Tommie Lewis & Magdalena Racing	
not nominated	Tap Daddy	2	$65,000	Steve Asmussen	Winchell Thoroughbreds	
not nominated	Kingsville	2	$44,000	Danny Pish	Armstrong, Saenz & Pish	
	Vouch	2	$25,000	Arnaud Delacour	Lael Stables & Three Chimneys Farm	
	Dark Vader	2	$50,000	Peter Eurton	Alesia, Burns Racing, Ciaglia Racing & Christensen	
	Marconi	2	$36,520	Todd Pletcher	Bridlewood Farm, Magnier, Smith & Tabor	
	Take the One O One	2	$36,345	J. Keith Desormeaux	Jay Em Ess Stable	
not nominated	Zanesville	2	$9,600	Thomas Amoss	Rosemont Farms	
not nominated	Kowboy Karma	1	$90,000	J. Larry Jones	Jones, Jones & Pressley	
not nominated	Bode's Maker	1	$27,500	Allen Milligan	Keane Thoroughbreds	
	Zing Zang	1	$26,600	Steve Asmussen	Jackpot Ranch	
not nominated	Night Strike	1	$26,000	W. Bret Calhoun	Erich Brehm	
	Lionite	1	$25,000	Steve Asmussen	Winchell Thor. and Willis Horton Racing	
	For Him	1	$24,000	Michael Pender	Michael Lombardy	
	High North	1	$17,200	Brad H. Cox	Shortleaf Stable	
not nominated	Alkhaatam	1	$12,500	Chad Brown	Shadwell Stable	
not nominated	Mugaritz	1	$11,840	Jonathan Wong	Alejandro Mercado	
not nominated	Ebben	1	$10,671	Steve Margolis	Craig Agular	
	Regulate	1	$9,000	Bob Baffert	Juddmonte Farms	
not nominated	Regalian	1	$7,500	Chris Engelhart	Island Wind Racing	
	Shivermetimbers	1	$6,000	Jerry Hollendorfer	M. DeDomenico and West Point Thor.	

Winner of Kentucky Derby in bold

- Entrants for Kentucky Derby in blue
- "Also eligible" for Kentucky Derby in green
- Sidelined/Not under Derby Consideration/Not nominated in gray

=== Prep season events ===
Note: 1st=10 points; 2nd=4 points; 3rd=2 points; 4th=1 point (except the Breeders' Cup Juvenile: 1st=20 points; 2nd=8 points; 3rd=4 points; 4th=2 point)

Race	Distance	Purse	Track	Date	1st	2nd	3rd	4th	Ref
Iroquois	1 1/16 miles	$150,000	Churchill Downs	Sep 16 2017	The Tabulator	Hollywood Star	Ten City	Ebben	
FrontRunner	1 1/16 miles	$301,380	Santa Anita	Sep 30 2017	Bolt d'Oro	Solomini	Take the One O One	Ayacara	
Champagne	1 mile	$500,000	Belmont	Oct 7 2017	Firenze Fire	Good Magic	Enticed	Kowboy Karma	
Breeders' Futurity	1 1/16 miles	$500,000	Keeneland	Oct 7 2017	Free Drop Billy	Bravazo	Lone Sailor	Lionite	
Breeders' Cup Juvenile	1 1/16 miles	$2,000,000	Del Mar	Nov 4 2017	Good Magic	Solomini	Bolt d'Oro	Givemeaminit	
Delta Downs Jackpot	1 1/16 miles	$1,000,000	Delta Downs	Nov 18 2017	cancelled				
Kentucky Jockey Club	1 1/16 miles	$200,000	Churchill Downs	Nov 25 2017	Enticed	Tiz Mischief	Promises Fulfilled	High North	
Remsen	1 1/8 miles	$250,000	Aqueduct	Dec 2 2017	Catholic Boy	Avery Island	Vouch	Alkhaatam	
Los Alamitos Futurity	1 1/16 miles	$300,000	Los Alamitos	Dec 9 2017	McKinzie (Note: Solomini finished first but was disqualified to third)	Instilled Regard	Solomini	For Him	
Springboard Mile	1 mile	$400,000	Remington	Dec 17 2017	Greyvitos	Combatant	Kingsville	Night Strike	
Sham	1 mile	$100,345	Santa Anita	Jan 6 2018	McKinzie	All Out Blitz	My Boy Jack	Shivermetimbers	
Jerome	1 mile	$150,000	Aqueduct	Jan 13 2018 (Note: Originally the Jerome Stakes was scheduled for January 1 but due to the prolonged extreme cold weather, it was postponed until January 13)	Firenze Fire	Seven Trumpets	Coltandmississippi	Regalian	
Lecomte	1 mile & 70 yards	$200,000	Fair Grounds	Jan 13 2018	Instilled Regard	Principe Guilherme	Snapper Sinclair	Zing Zang	
Smarty Jones	1 mile	$150,000	Oaklawn	Jan 15 2018	Mourinho	Combatant	Tap Daddy	Bode's Maker	
Withers	1 1/8 miles	$245,000	Aqueduct	Feb 3 2018	Avery Island	Firenze Fire	Marconi	Coltandmississippi	
Robert B. Lewis	1 1/16 miles	$151,380	Santa Anita	Feb 3 2018	Lombo	Ayacara	Dark Vader	Regulate	
Holy Bull	1 1/16 miles	$350,000	Gulfstream	Feb 3 2018	Audible	Free Drop Billy	Tiz Mischief	Enticed	
Sam F. Davis Stakes	1 1/16 miles	$250,000	Tampa Bay	Feb 10 2018	Flameaway	Catholic Boy	Vino Rosso	Hollywood Star	
El Camino Real Derby	1 1/8 miles	$100,900	Golden Gate	Feb 17 2018	Paved	City Plan	Blended Citizen	Mugaritz	
Southwest	1 1/16 miles	$500,000	Oaklawn	Feb 19 2018	My Boy Jack	Combatant	Sporting Chance	Mourinho	

=== Championship series events ===
==== First leg of series ====
Note: 1st=50 points; 2nd=20 points; 3rd=10 points; 4th=5 points

Race	Distance	Purse	Grade	Track	Date	1st	2nd	3rd	4th	Ref
Risen Star	1 1/16 miles	$400,000	2	Fair Grounds	Feb 17 2018	Bravazo	Snapper Sinclair	Noble Indy	Instilled Regard	
Fountain of Youth	1 1/16 miles	$400,000	2	Gulfstream	Mar 3 2018	Promises Fulfilled	Strike Power	Good Magic	Machismo	
Tampa Bay Derby	1 1/16 miles	$355,000	2	Tampa Bay	Mar 10 2018	Quip	Flameaway	World of Trouble	Vino Rosso	
Gotham	1 mile	$300,000	3	Aqueduct	Mar 10 2018	Enticed	Old Time Revival	Free Drop Billy	Firenze Fire	
San Felipe	1 1/16 miles	$400,690	2	Santa Anita	Mar 10 2018	Bolt d'Oro (Note: McKinzie finished first but was disqualified to second)	McKinzie	Kanthaka	Peace	
Rebel	1 1/16 miles	$900,000	2	Oaklawn	Mar 17 2018	Magnum Moon	Solomini	Combatant	Title Ready	
Sunland Derby	1 1/8 miles	$800,000	3	Sunland Park	Mar 25 2018	Runaway Ghost	Dream Baby Dream	Peace	Seven Trumpets	

==== Second leg of series ====
These races are the major preps for the Kentucky Derby, and are thus weighted more heavily. Note: 1st=100 points; 2nd=40 points; 3rd=20 points; 4th=10 points

Race	Distance	Purse	Grade	Track	Date	1st	2nd	3rd	4th	Ref
Louisiana Derby	1 1/8 miles	$1,000,000	2	Fair Grounds	Mar 24 2018	Noble Indy	Lone Sailor	My Boy Jack	Givemeamint	
UAE Derby	1,900 metres (~1 3/16 miles)	$2,000,000	2	Meydan	Mar 31 2018	Mendelssohn	Rayya	Reride	Gold Town	
Florida Derby	1 1/8 miles	$1,100,000	1	Gulfstream	Mar 31 2018	Audible	Hofburg	Mississippi	Catholic Boy	
Wood Memorial	1 1/8 miles	$1,000,000 (Note: Originally The Wood Memorial was to have a purse of $750,000 but was raised to $1 million when a Grade 1 winner started in the event. Firenze Fire was a winner of the Grade 1 Champagne Stakes.)	2	Aqueduct	Apr 7 2018	Vino Rosso	Enticed	Restoring Hope	Firenze Fire	
Blue Grass Stakes	1 1/8 miles	$1,000,000	2	Keeneland	Apr 7 2018	Good Magic	Flameaway	Free Drop Billy (Note: Sporting Chance finished third but was disqualified to fourth)	Sporting Chance	
Santa Anita Derby	1 1/8 miles	$1,000,345	1	Santa Anita	Apr 7 2018	Justify	Bolt d'Oro	Core Beliefs	Instilled Regard	
Arkansas Derby	1 1/8 miles	$1,000,000	1	Oaklawn Park	Apr 14 2018	Magnum Moon	Quip	Solomini	Combatant	

==== "Wild Card" events ====
Note: 1st=20 points; 2nd=8 points; 3rd=4 points; 4th=2 point

Race	Distance	Purse	Track	Date	1st	2nd	3rd	4th	Ref
Spiral (Note: The Spiral Stakes is known as the Jeff Ruby Steaks for commercial reasons.)	1 1/8 miles	$202,400	Turfway	Mar 17 2018	Blended Citizen	Pony Up	Arawak	Zanesville	
Lexington	1 1/8 miles	$200,000	Keeneland	Apr 14 2018	My Boy Jack	Telekinesis	Pony Up	Greyvitos	

== Japan Road to the Kentucky Derby ==
The Japan Road to the Kentucky Derby is intended to provide a place in the Derby starting gate to the top finisher in the series. If the connections of that horse decline the invitation, their place is offered to the second-place finisher and so on through the top four finishers. If neither of the top four accept, this place in the starting gate reverts to the horses on the main road to the Derby. Eligible Earnings, defined as career earnings through April 14, 2018, serves as the tie-break if two or more horses have the same number of points. For 2018, none of the invitations was accepted.

=== Qualification table ===
The top four horses (colored brown within the standings) are eligible to participate in the Kentucky Derby provided the horse is nominated.

Rank	Horse	Points	Eligible Earnings	Trainer	Owner	Ref
1^	Sumahama	30	$291,287	R. Takahashi	Sanshisuimei Co. Ltd.	
2~	Ruggero	16	$220,861	Y. Shikato	Takashi Muraki	
3~	Taiki Ferveur	12	$240,689	M. Makiura	U. Taiki Farm	
4^	Le Vent Se Leve	10	$463,935	K. Hagiwara	G1 Racing Co.	
5	Don Fortis	4	$436,916	M. Makiura	K. Yamada	
6	Mic Ben Hur	4	$122,696	Y. Hatakeyama	Kiratto One Co., Ltd.	
7	Great Time	3	$186,586	Hideaki Fujiwara	Kaneko Makoto Holdings Co. Ltd.	
8	Haseno Pyro	2	$263,981	K. Sato	F. Hasegawa	
9	Meiner Yukitsubaki	2	$179,190	N. Takagi	K. Thoroughbred Club Ruffian	
10	Dark Repulser	1	$200,920	T. Kanari	Akira Katayama	
11	Bronze Key	1	$75,979	K. Tsunoda	Hiroshi Hatasa	

^ - not nominated

~ - declined offer to participate

=== Events ===
Race	Distance	Track	Date	1st	2nd	3rd	4th	Ref
Cattleya Sho	1,600 metres (~1 mile)	Tokyo Racecourse	Nov 25 2017	Ruggero	Mic Ben Hur	Meiner Yukitsubaki	Bronze Key	
Zen-Nippon Nisai Yushun	1,600 metres (~1 mile)	Kawasaki Racecourse	Dec 13 2017	Le Vent Se Leve	Don Fortis	Haseno Pyro	Dark Repulser	
Hyacinth	1,600 metres (~1 mile)	Tokyo Racecourse	Feb 18 2018	Sumahama	Taiki Ferveur	Ruggero	Great Time	

Note: Cattleya Sho and Zen-Nippon Nisai Yushun: 1st=10 points; 2nd=4 points; 3rd=2 points; 4th=1 points Note: Hyacinth: 1st=30 points; 2nd=12 points; 3rd=6 points; 4th=3 points

== European Road to the Kentucky Derby ==
The European Road to the Kentucky Derby is designed on a similar basis to the Japan Road and is intended to provide a place in the Derby starting gate to the top finisher in the series. If the connections of that horse decline the invitation, their place is offered to the second-place finisher and so on. If neither of the top four accept, this place in the starting gate reverts to the horses on the main road to the Derby. Eligible Earnings, defined as non-restricted stakes earnings through April 14, 2018, serves as the tie-break if two or more horses have the same number of points. If non-restricted stakes earnings happen to be identical, career earnings through April 14, 2018 would be used to break the tie.

The series consists of seven races – four run on the turf in late 2017 when the horses are age two, plus three races run on a synthetic surface in early 2018.

=== Qualification table ===
The following table shows the points earned in the eligible races for the European series. The top four horses (colored brown within the standings) were eligible for the invitation to participate in the Kentucky Derby, provided the horse was nominated. The connections of Gronkowski, who finished first with 50 points, accepted the invitation but Gronkowski subsequently became ill and had to miss the race. The second-place finisher, Mendelssohn, separately qualified on the main Road by winning the UAE Derby.

Rank	Horse	Points	Eligible Earnings	Trainer	Owner	Ref
1 - ill	Gronkowski	50	$99,945	Jeremy Noseda	Phoenix Thoroughbreds (Note: Rob Gronkowski, the football player, bought a share of Gronkowski, the horse, in April.)	
2 - qualified on main Road	Mendelssohn	20	$1,947,299	Aidan O'Brien	Smith, Magnier & Tabor	
3 - not nominated	Saxon Warrior	20	$245,017	Aidan O'Brien	Derrick Smith, Mrs. John Magnier & Michael Tabor	
4 - not nominated	Roaring Lion	14	$136,807	John Gosden	Qatar Racing Limited	
	Iconic Sunset	12	$30,139	James Tate	Saeed Manana	
	Happily	10	$543,648	Aidan O'Brien	Derrick Smith, Mrs. John Magnier & Michael Tabor	
	Threeandfourpence	8	$53,150	Aidan O'Brien	Smith, Magnier & Tabor	
	Court House	8		John Gosden	Princess Haya of Jordan	
	Dark Acclaim	6	$30,139	Marco Botti	Middleham Park Racing & Partners	
	Seahenge	4	$144,705	Aidan O'Brien	Smith, Magnier & Tabor	
	Olmedo	4	$113,505	Jean-Claude Rouget	Ecurie Antonio Caro & Gerard Augustin-Normand	
	Nelson	4	$99,826	Aidan O'Brien	Derrick Smith, Mrs. John Magnier & Michael Tabor	
	Delano Roosevelt	4	$38,074	Aidan O'Brien	Derrick Smith, Mrs. John Magnier & Michael Tabor	
	Fortune's Pearl	4	$1,800	Andrew Balding	Qatar Racing Limited	
	Purser	3	$19,215	John Gosden	Prince Khalid Abdullah	
	Masar	2	$101,264	Charles Appleby	Godolphin Racing LLC	
	The Pentagon	2	$71,981	Aidan O'Brien	Derrick Smith, Mrs. John Magnier & Michael Tabor	
	Mildenberger	2	$64,634	Mark Johnston	Sheikh Hamdan Bin Mohammed Al Maktoum	
	Warm The Voice	2	$12,904	Brendan Duke	Mrs. J.S. Bolger	
	Ventura Knight	2	$33,654	Mark Johnston	Middleham Park Racing XXXVII	
	Blackgold Fairy	2	$15,164	Michael Halford	Zhang Yuesheng	
	Verbal Dexterity	1	$280,269	Jim Bolger	Mrs. J.S. Bolger	
	Kew Gardens	1	$58,741	Aidan O'Brien	Derrick Smith, Mrs. John Magnier & Michael Tabor	
	Woodmax	1	$23,610	Nicolas Clement	M J Jooste	
	Petrus	1	$11,454	Brian Meehan	GPM Moreland	

=== Events ===
Race	Location	Distance	Track	Date	1st	2nd	3rd	4th	Ref
Beresford Stakes	IRE	1 mile	Curragh Racecourse	Sep 24 2017	Saxon Warrior	Delano Roosevelt	Warm The Voice	Kew Gardens	
Royal Lodge Stakes	GB	1 mile	Newmarket Racecourse	Sep 30 2017	Roaring Lion	Nelson	Mildenberger	Petrus	
Prix Jean-Luc Lagardère	FR	1,600 metres (~1 mile)	Chantilly Racecourse	Oct 1 2017	Happily	Olmedo	Masar	Woodmax	
Racing Post Trophy	GB	1 mile	Doncaster Racecourse	Oct 28 2017	Saxon Warrior	Roaring Lion	The Pentagon	Verbal Dexterity	
Road to the Kentucky Derby Stakes	GB	1 mile	Kempton Park Racecourse	Mar 7 2018 (Note: Originally the Road to the Kentucky Derby Condition Stakes was scheduled for March 1 but due to the snow associated with the European cold wave the event was postponed until March 7)	Gronkowski	Court House	Fortune's Pearl	Ventura Knight	
Patton Stakes	IRE	1 mile	Dundalk Racecourse	Mar 9 2018 (Note: Originally the Patton Stakes was scheduled for March 2 but due to the bitter cold and snowy weather, it was postponed until March 9)	Mendelssohn	Threeandfourpence	Seahenge	Blackgold Fairy	
Burradon Stakes	GB	1 mile & 5 yards	Newcastle Racecourse	Mar 30 2018	Gronkowski	Iconic Sunset	Dark Acclaim	Purser	

Points offered:

- the four races in 2017 for two-year-olds: 1st=10 points; 2nd=4 points; 3rd=2 points; 4th=1 points
- the first two races in 2018: 1st=20 points; 2nd=8 points; 3rd=4 points; 4th=2 points
- the Burradon Stakes: 1st=30 points; 2nd=12 points; 3rd=6 points; 4th=3 points

== See also ==
- 2018 Kentucky Derby
- 2018 Road to the Kentucky Oaks
