= Justify (horse) =

American-bred Thoroughbred racehorse, 2018 Triple Crown winner

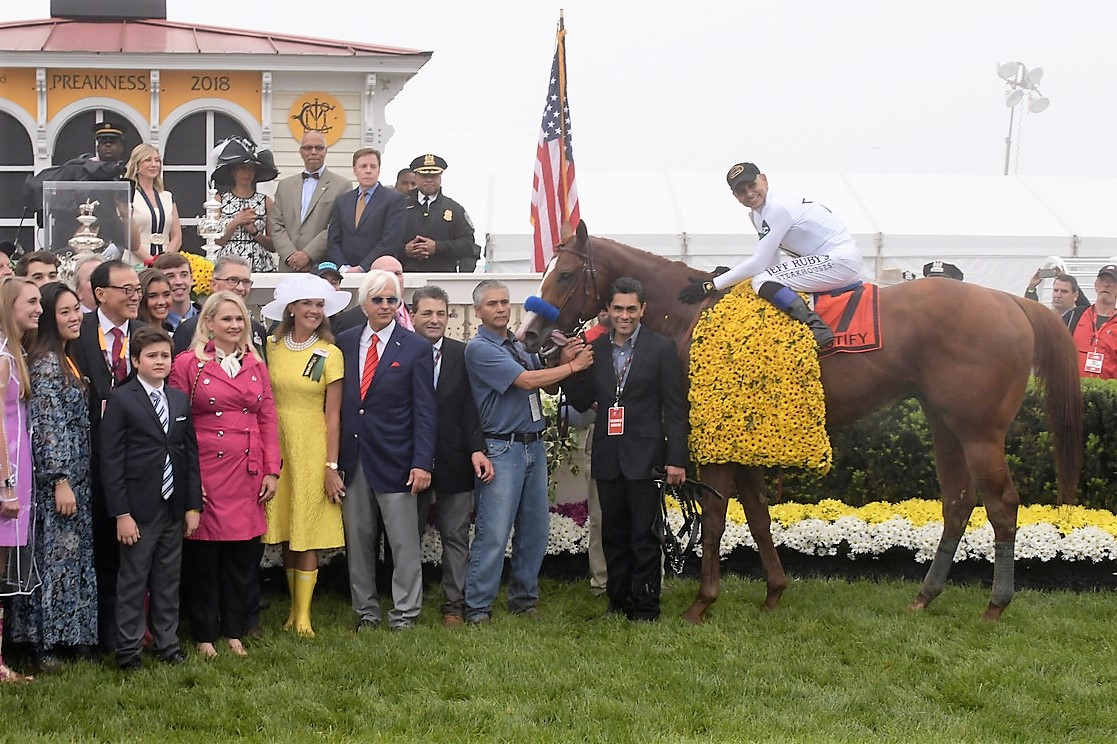
- Justify and his connections after the 2018 Preakness Stakes
- Sire: Scat Daddy
- Grandsire: Johannesburg
- Dam: Stage Magic
- Damsire: Ghostzapper
- Sex: Stallion
- Foaled: March 28, 2015 (age 11); Versailles, Kentucky, U.S.
- Country: United States
- Color: Chestnut
- Breeder: John D. Gunther
- Owner: WinStar Farm (majority owner), China Horse Club, Head of Plains Partners, Starlight Racing, Carcone Racing Stable
- Trainer: Bob Baffert
- Record: 6: 5–0–0
- Earnings: $3,198,000

Major wins
- Triple Crown wins: Kentucky Derby (2018); Preakness Stakes (2018); Belmont Stakes (2018)

Awards
- 13th U.S. Triple Crown Champion (2018); American Champion Three-Year-Old Male Horse (2018); American Horse of the Year (2018)

Honors
- National Museum of Racing and Hall of Fame (2024)

Justify (born on March 28, 2015) is a US Hall of Fame Thoroughbred racehorse who is known for being the thirteenth winner of the American Triple Crown. He also was the first horse since Apollo in 1882 to win the Kentucky Derby without racing as a two-year-old.

Justify first attracted attention with a win in his debut race on February 18, 2018. He went on to win the Kentucky Derby, the Preakness Stakes and the Belmont Stakes to become the 13th Triple Crown winner. He was retired, undefeated, several weeks after the Belmont and became the only American Triple Crown winner in history who was never beaten in his entire career on the track. (In 2024 he was technically, retroactively, disqualified from his 2018 Santa Anita Derby run.)

Justify's ancestors include Secretariat via A.P. Indy, Count Fleet via Mr. Prospector 2nd dam, War Admiral via A.P. Indy Dam Weekend Surprise, Omaha via Nijinsky, and Gallant Fox, all of whom also won the American Triple Crown.

On September 11, 2019, it was revealed via The New York Times that Justify tested positive for scopolamine, a banned substance that can be performance enhancing, in excess of what is normally found in tainted feed. The positive came just a few days after his win in the 2018 Santa Anita Derby. In December 2023, a court judge ordered that stewards issue a new ruling that would effectively disqualify Justify from that race. In March 2024, Justify was disqualified by California racing officials from the Santa Anita Derby, retroactively revoking his undefeated Triple Crown claim and overall career undefeated streak and changing his overall record from 6 wins in 6 starts to 5 wins in 6 starts.

== Background ==
Justify is a chestnut stallion with a large white blaze on his forehead. He was bred in Kentucky by Canadian John D. Gunther, who runs Glennwood Farm in Versailles, Kentucky, with his daughter Tanya. Although the Gunthers have a small breeding operation, their 2015 foals also included Without Parole, a Grade I winner at Royal Ascot, Vino Rosso, a graded stakes winner who raced against Justify in both the Kentucky Derby and Belmont Stakes, and Grade I winner Competitionofideas. For this accomplishment, Gunther earned the 2018 Eclipse Award for Outstanding Breeder. Gunther also bred Justify's dam, Stage Magic, a stakes-placed daughter of Ghostzapper. Stage Magic was subsequently named the 2018 Kentucky Broodmare of the Year.

Justify was part of the second-last crop of Scat Daddy, who won the Champagne Stakes and Florida Derby. Although Scat Daddy ran in America on the dirt, as a stallion he first made his reputation in Europe and South America as a turf sire, with Grade I winners including Lady Aurelia and Caravaggio His stud fee when he was bred to Stage Magic in 2014 was only $35,000, though it was scheduled to increase to $100,000 in 2016. However, Scat Daddy died prematurely at the age of eleven in December 2015.

Justify was sold at the 2016 Keeneland September Yearling Sales for $500,000 to a recently formed partnership between WinStar Farm (60% ownership), China Horse Club (25%) and SF Racing (15%), the latter run by employees of George Soros's investment firm. David Hanley, general manager of WinStar, said that Justify stood out at the sales. "He was a beautiful yearling – had great balance and leg, great shoulder, and lovely length and neck, and power", he said. "For a big horse, he was very light on his feet, with good action and good energy." In early March 2018, SF Racing sold a share to Starlight Racing, then Sol Kumin's Head of Plains partners also bought a share in late March.

Justify grew into a massive horse, standing 16.3 hands (67 inches, 170 cm) at the withers and weighing either 1,268 pounds (575 kg) or 1,380 pounds (630 kg) during his Triple Crown run. He was initially sent to trainer Rodolphe Brisset at Keeneland but pulled a muscle and was given time to recover and grow into his frame. In January 2018, he was sent to Santa Anita to be trained by Bob Baffert.

== Racing career ==
=== Qualifying for the Derby ===
Justify did not make his first start until February 18, 2018, in a maiden special weight race for three-year-olds at Santa Anita Park over seven furlongs. Going off as the 1-2 favorite, he broke poorly, then rushed up to challenge for the early lead. After completing the first quarter mile in a quick 21.80 seconds, he began to open up an advantage on the rest of the field, ultimately winning by 9 1/2 lengths. The impressive win earned a Beyer Speed Figure of 104 and caused the Thoroughbred Daily News to designate the colt as a "Rising Star". "It's not too late", said Baffert regarding the colt's chances of qualifying for the Kentucky Derby. "I've got a plan... We're looking (for a graded stakes race). He's shown his brilliance in the morning."

Justify made his next start on March 11 in an allowance race at Santa Anita, run at a distance of one mile. As the overwhelming 1-20 favorite, he broke slowly and settled behind the early leaders, On the far turn, he quickened and swept to an easy 6 1/2 length win. "I didn't ask him to move", said jockey Mike Smith, riding the colt for the first time. "He came off that turn like it was a stroll. Just very, very impressed. I hate to compare him to other horses right now, but doesn't he remind you of an Easy Goer way back in the day. Just a big ol’ red horse with a big, powerful stride."

Despite never having raced in stakes company, Justify was subsequently ranked as one of the leading contenders for the Kentucky Derby, moving into seventh place in the March 12 NTRA poll. However, the colt first needed to qualify by earning points in the 2018 Road to the Kentucky Derby. Baffert originally planned to run stablemate McKinzie in the Santa Anita Derby and ship Justify to Oaklawn Park for the Arkansas Derby. But when McKinzie suffered a setback due to injury, Baffert decided to keep Justify at his home base for the Santa Anita Derby.

On April 7, Justify entered the Santa Anita Derby as part of a field of seven horses. His main rival was Bolt d'Oro, a multiple stakes winner and another top contender on the Derby trail. The two horses were almost evenly matched in the betting, with Justify going off as the slight favorite. He went to the early lead then set a comfortable pace down the backstretch, moving with a "freak stride" that helped him conserve energy. Around the final turn, the field started to close the gap, with Bolt d'Oro getting to within 1 1/2 lengths in mid-stretch. Justify responded to the challenge and drew away for a three-length lead despite drifting somewhat down the homestretch.

==== Positive drug test ====
On September 11, 2019, The New York Times reported that Justify failed a drug test for scopolamine after winning the Santa Anita Derby. The amount detected was 300 nanograms per milliliter — well in excess of the international standard of 60 ng/ml and the modified limit in California of 75 ng/ml. According to the veterinarian quoted in the New York Times article, the excessive amount detected suggested that it was used as a performance enhancer and was not simply a feed contaminant. At that time, such a drug positive could have resulted in Justify's disqualification from the Santa Anita Derby, which in turn would have meant he would not have received the points required to qualify for the Kentucky Derby. However, the California Horse Racing Board (CHRB) did not announce the positive and delayed making a decision on the case before ultimately dismissing it in August. In January 2019, the CHRB changed the penalty for a scopolamine test positive to a fine and trainer suspension, which is consistent with Association of Racing Commissioners International standards adopted effective January 1, 2017.

Dr. Rick Arthur, the board's equine medical director, subsequently explained that their investigation suggested that the result was in fact due to feed contamination by jimson weed. One key factor was that horses from five different barns had high readings for scopalimine over the same period, though none of these were as high as Justify's. Arthur pointed out that Justify may well have ingested a seed, or his reading may have been inflated because of dehydration after the race. "Even though the level was relatively high in urine, the blood level was actually quite low", he said, explaining that this and the presence of another drug, atropine, found in jimson weed were consistent with feed contamination.

Baffert issued a statement on September 12 that said, "I unequivocally reject any implication that scopolamine was ever intentionally administered to Justify, or any of my horses."

On December 1, 2023, Judge Mitchell Beckloff of the Los Angeles County Superior Court ordered CHRB stewards to issue a new ruling to state that Justify won the Santa Anita Derby with illegal medication in his system, which would disqualify the horse from the race. The order was the result of a lawsuit from Mick Ruis, owner of Santa Anita Derby runner-up Bolt d'Oro, who filed the litigation after stewards announced they were not required to disqualify Justify. Soon after the decision, a CHRB spokesman said that the board was weighing their legal options. On March 7, 2024, The Blood-Horse reported that the CHRB had agreed to a $300,000 settlement with Ruis to resolve all claims and would instruct stewards to issue a disqualification ruling. Santa Anita stewards issued the new ruling on March 30, 2024, pursuant to the court order. As of the date of the stewards ruling, Equibase has yet to update its official race chart. In April 2024, Justify's owners filed a notice of appeal, claiming that their absence as a party in the litigation between Ruis and the CHRB led to a denial of due process.

=== Kentucky Derby ===
The first-place finish in the Santa Anita Derby moved Justify to the top position in the NTRA 3-year-old poll and made him the favorite for the Kentucky Derby. To win the race though, he would have to overcome the so-called "Curse of Apollo" – no horse had won the Kentucky Derby without racing as a two-year-old since Apollo in 1882. Baffert pointed to the horse's natural ability but acknowledged the colt was still green. Furthermore, the field for the 2018 Kentucky Derby was considered one of the best in recent memory, with most of the major prep race winners given serious consideration by handicappers. In addition to Justify, the field included graded stakes winners Good Magic (Breeders' Cup Juvenile and Blue Grass Stakes), Mendelssohn (Breeders' Cup Juvenile Turf and UAE Derby), Audible (Florida Derby), Magnum Moon (Arkansas Derby), Noble Indy (Louisiana Derby), Vino Rosso (Wood Memorial), My Boy Jack (Lexington Stakes), Free Drop Billy (Breeders' Futurity), Firenze Fire (Champagne Stakes) and Bolt d'Oro.

Justify in starting gate for Kentucky Derby

The 2018 Kentucky Derby was held on May 5 on a rainy day at Churchill Downs. Although the surface had been sealed earlier in the day to minimize the effect of the rain on the footing, the track condition was still labeled as sloppy. Justify broke well and used his early speed to establish good position near the rail going into the first turn, running a length behind Promises Fulfilled in a fast opening quarter of 22.24 seconds. These two maintained their position for the first three-quarters of a mile, completed in 1:11, followed closely by Bolt d'Oro, Flameaway, and Good Magic. Going into the final turn, Promises Fulfilled dropped back while first Bolt d'Oro and then Good Magic were put to a drive. Justify responded to the challenge and opened up a lead of 1 1/2 lengths at the top of the stretch, widening to 2 1/2 lengths at the finish line. Good Magic held on for second while Audible closed late to finish third.

Justify came out of the race almost untouched by the mud due to his front-running style. The day after however, he appeared to be somewhat lame in his left hind leg – a condition that Baffert attributed to "scratches or whatever" from the wet track. The sensitivity was later determined to have been caused by a heel bruise. To protect the heel, Justify was shod with a three-quarter horseshoe before he resumed galloping on May 10.

=== Preakness Stakes ===
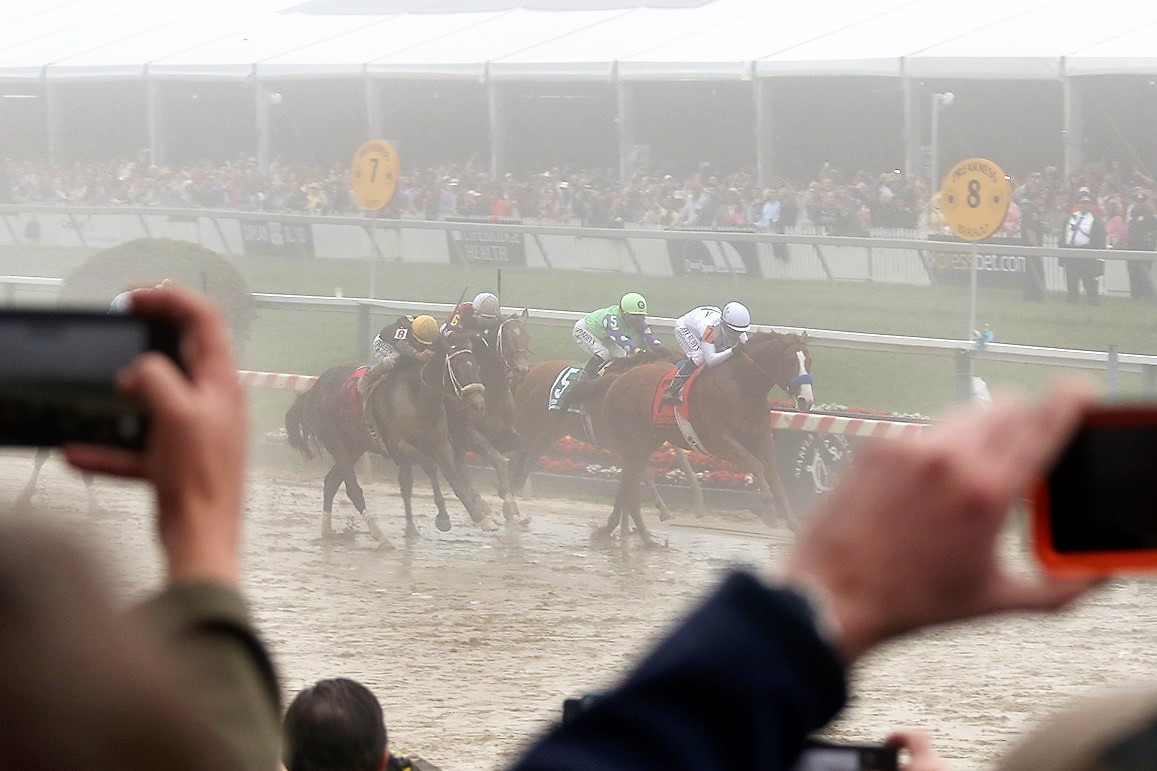
Justify narrowly wins in a blanket finish at the 2018 Preakness

The track conditions for the 2018 Preakness Stakes, run on May 19 at Pimlico Racetrack in Baltimore, were even worse than for the Derby. After heavy rain over several days, the track was sloppy. The rain finally stopped shortly before the race but then a heavy fog descended, limiting visibility to about a sixteenth of a mile.

The start was once again critical, and Justify broke well to take the early lead. To his inside, Good Magic rushed up to challenge him and the two matched strides around the first turn and down the backstretch while setting moderate fractions. They picked up the pace rounding the final turn and opened a gap on the rest of the field. However, in mid-stretch, Tenfold started closing ground rapidly to Justify's outside while Bravazo, who had trailed by five lengths in mid-stretch, was moving fastest of all in the center of the track. Justify dug in to win by half a length over Bravazo, with Tenfold just a neck farther back in third, another neck in front of Good Magic.

The win earned Justify a Beyer Speed Figure of 97, the lowest of his career. Baffert felt that the colt had suffered a bit of a "bounce", or regression, from a peak performance in the Derby. He was still impressed by Justify's performance, pointing out that the colt had been pushed hard by Good Magic and had also reacted greenly by jumping several puddles during the race. "You can't bring it all the time", he said. "This will set him up for the next one."

On May 24, ESPN.com and the New York Times reported that Justify's breeding rights had been sold prior to the running of the Preakness to Coolmore Stud (which had owned his sire Scat Daddy) for $60 million. Reportedly, a bonus of $25 million would kick in if Justify subsequently won the Triple Crown. WinStar Farm replied that they had received many inquiries but nothing would be finalized in the "foreseeable future".

=== Belmont Stakes ===
Baffert was the trainer of the prior Triple Crown winner, American Pharoah in 2015, and followed a similar training regimen with Justify at Churchill Downs until shipping to New York a few days before the Belmont. Baffert noted that one of the main differences between the two horses was their attitude: American Pharoah is known as a kind, easy going horse whereas Justify is more dominant. "You have to watch him", said Baffert. "He likes to push you around. He's not a mean horse, but his patience level with people is, like, five seconds."

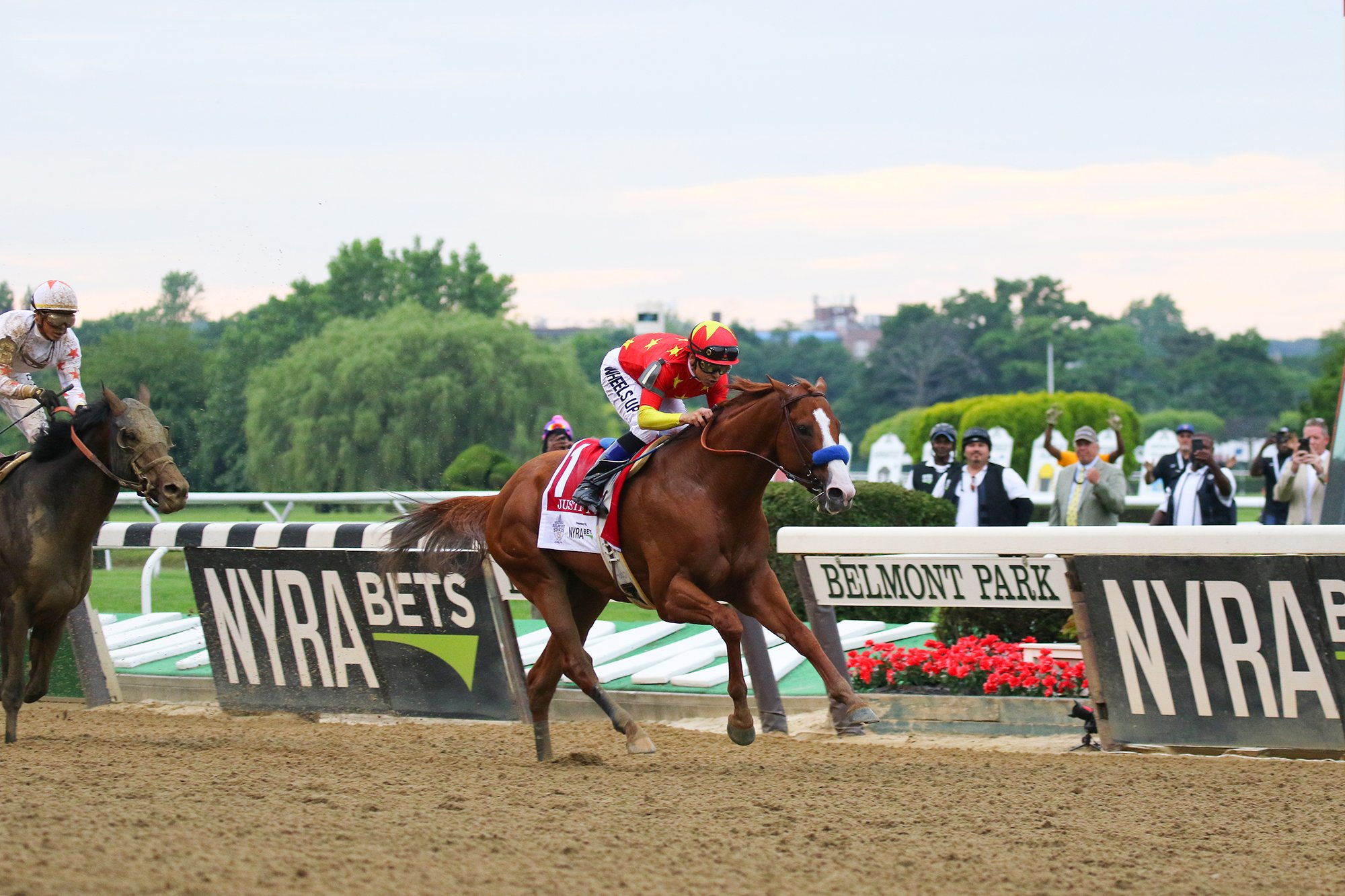
Justify wins the Belmont Stakes.

The 2018 Belmont Stakes was run on June 9 over a fast track before a sold-out crowd of 90,000. Justify drew post position one, which meant that a poor start would have resulted in him getting trapped on the rail. However, Justify broke well and Smith sent him to the lead with a quick opening quarter of 23.37. He then slowed down the pace as they moved around the first turn and down the backstretch, leading by two lengths over Restoring Hope as he completed the mile in 1:38.09. Around the far turn, Vino Rosso mounted a drive to move into second place, while Gronkowski and Hofburg started closing on Vino Rosso from far back. Despite drifting out slightly in the stretch, Justify increased a one length lead over the challengers after the final turn to win by 1 3/4 lengths over Gronkowski. He completed the mile and a half race in 2:28.18.

Baffert was elated following the race. "It's just amazing, I'm so proud to be an American, very emotional and a lot of help upstairs", he told Forbes. "It never gets old. American Pharoah was my first love, but wow, Mike Smith deserves something like this. This horse is just amazing, he could have won every race on the undercard today."

The win made Justify the thirteenth winner of the American Triple Crown, and just the second horse to accomplish the feat while still undefeated. Justify's owners received a total of $2.94 million for winning all three Triple Crown races.

==== Controversy ====
Following the Belmont Stakes, observers questioned the tactics of jockey Florent Geroux aboard Restoring Hope, who was also trained by Baffert. Restoring Hope broke slowly from the starting gate but quickly headed for the lead in between horses, cutting in front of Noble Indy and drifting wide entering the first turn. He then veered left, pushing Bravazo towards the rail. Some of those connected to other horses in the race believed that Geroux's actions helped give Justify an advantage by giving him an uncontested lead. Mike Repole, the co-owner of Vino Rosso and Noble Indy, told the Daily Racing Form that he was confused by seeing Restoring Hope "rush up like he was a Quarter Horse". Vino Rosso's rider John Velasquez said he felt like Geroux was trying to protect Justify. On the other hand, D. Wayne Lukas, the trainer of Bravazo, found the situation "strange", but did not think Restoring Hope's actions affected the outcome of the race.

In response, Baffert said that his original plan was to have Restoring Hope sit behind Justify in second. Geroux stated that he wanted to be towards the front early but Restoring Hope became rank. "When he broke a step slow – he's kind of an aggressive horse to ride, he pulls very hard – I wanted to make sure I put him in the clear. I didn't want to break, get the horse covered up and then the horse starts getting aggressive behind horses. It would have been even worse if he was behind horses." Gary West, the owner of Restoring Hope, told the New York Post that he was unaware of any plan to have the colt near the pace. "Maybe the horse was completely out of control and Florent had no choice. I will never know." The Belmont Park stewards spoke to Geroux about his ride the Thursday following the race. Geroux said he felt like the stewards were only talking to him because of the media attention. "I didn't bother anybody, I didn't shut anybody off. If there was something, I think they would have contacted me right away to review the race", he said.

=== Injury ===
After the Belmont, Justify was returned to Churchill Downs where he was paraded before a large crowd on June 16. He was then shipped back to Santa Anita, where he was paraded on June 23. Baffert kept Justify in light training to give the colt time to recover from the grueling Triple Crown campaign. His ultimate target was to complete the Grand Slam later in the year by racing Justify in the Breeders Cup Classic. In early July, Baffert noticed a slight filling in the ankle of Justify's left front leg. The filling subsided but then reappeared a few days later, so Baffert decided to send the colt for a detailed evaluation. Justify was officially retired from racing on July 25, 2018, ending the colt's bid for the Grand Slam.

== Statistics ==
Date	Age	Distance	Race	Grade	Track	Odds	Field	Finish	Winning time	Winning (losing) margin	Jockey	Ref
Feb 15, 2018	3	7 furlongs	Maiden Special Weight	Maiden	Santa Anita	0.50*	5	1	1:21.86	9 1/2 lengths	Drayden Van Dyke	
Mar 11, 2018	3	1 mile	Allowance Optional Claiming	Allowance	Santa Anita	0.05*	5	1	1:35.73	6 1/2 lengths	Mike E. Smith	
Apr 7, 2018	3	1 1/8 miles	Santa Anita Derby	Grade I	Santa Anita	0.90*	7	DQ^{◆}	1:49.72	3 lengths	Mike E. Smith	
May 5, 2018	3	1 1/4 miles	Kentucky Derby	Grade I	Churchill Downs	2.90*	20	1	2:04.20	2 1/2 lengths	Mike E. Smith	
May 19, 2018	3	1 3/16 miles	Preakness Stakes	Grade I	Pimlico	0.40*	8	1	1:55.93	1/2 length	Mike E. Smith	
June 9, 2018	3	1 1/2 miles	Belmont Stakes	Grade I	Belmont Park	0.80*	10	1	2:28.18	1 3/4 length	Mike E. Smith	

* indicates that Justify was the post-time favorite.
^{◆}Justify originally finished first. Connections of Bolt d'Oro sued the California Horse Racing Board in 2020 to disqualify Justify because of a positive test for scopolamine, which was found in jimson weed that contaminates hay. In 2023, a Los Angeles County Superior Court judge ordered Justify disqualified unilaterally, which Justify's connections have appealed.

== Assessment and awards ==
In the 2018 World's Best Racehorse Rankings, Justify was given a rating of 125, making him the second best three-year-old colt behind Roaring Lion and the eighth best racehorse in the world.

On January 24, 2019, Justify was named the 2018 American Horse of the Year with 191 votes compared to 51 votes for Accelerate, who had won the Breeders' Cup Classic. Justify was also the unanimous selection for Champion three-year-old male.

Justify's win in the Belmont Stakes was named the NTRA Moment of the Year, chosen from events that illustrate "a range of human emotions as well as outstanding displays of equine athleticism".

In 2024, Justify was elected to the National Museum of Racing and Hall of Fame in his first year of eligibility. His formal induction took place in Saratoga Springs, New York on August 2, 2024.

== Stud career ==
On September 14, 2018, WinStar Farm announced that Justify would stand at Ashford Stud (Versailles, KY), the North American branch of Coolmore Stud, although the original ownership group had retained some breeding rights. His stud fee for 2019 was $150,000. In 2020, Harlocap, the first foal of Justify, a colt, out of Bodemeister mare Mezinka, was born on April 20, in Kentucky' Breed First LLC farm. He will stand at John Carey's T.C. Westmeath Stud Farm in Ontario for CA$ 3,500.

Coolmore announced that Justify's stud fee would be lowered to $100,000 for the 2022 breeding season and would not shuttle to Australia.

With the successes of Justify's progeny in 2023 his stud fee for 2024 was doubled to $200,000. With City of Troy's victory in the 2024 Epsom Derby, Justify became the second Kentucky Derby winner to sire an Epsom Derby winner, after Northern Dancer; for 2025 his stud fee was set at $250,000.

=== Notable progeny ===
c = colt, f = filly, g = gelding

Foaled	Name	Sex	Dam	Major Wins
2020	Arabian Lion	c	Unbound	Woody Stephens Stakes
2020	Aspen Grove	f	Data Dependant	Belmont Oaks
2021	British Isles	g	Purely Hot	Santa Anita Handicap
2021	Opera Singer	f	Liscanna	Prix Marcel Boussac, Nassau Stakes
2021	Just F Y I	f	Star Act	Frizette Stakes, Breeders' Cup Juvenile Fillies
2021	City of Troy	c	Together Forever	Dewhurst Stakes, Epsom Derby, Coral-Eclipse Stakes, International Stakes
2021	Hard To Justify	f	Instant Reflex	Breeders' Cup Juvenile Fillies Turf
2021	Ramatuelle	f	Raven's Lady	Prix de la Forêt
2021	Spicy Martini	f	Extra Olives	Stradbroke Handicap
2022	Ruling Court	c	Inchargeofme	2000 Guineas Stakes
2022	Scandinavia	c	Fabulous	Goodwood Cup (twice), St Leger Stakes, Ascot Gold Cup, Irish St. Leger
2024	Voyager	f	Chart	Natalma Stakes
2024	Haffner	c	Earth Strike	Breeders' Cup Juvenile Turf

== Pedigree ==
Pedigree of Justify, chestnut colt, March 28, 2015
Sire Scat Daddy 2004	Johannesburg; 1999	Hennessy	Storm Cat
Sire Scat Daddy 2004	Johannesburg; 1999	Hennessy	Island Kitty
Sire Scat Daddy 2004	Johannesburg; 1999	Myth	Ogygian
Sire Scat Daddy 2004	Johannesburg; 1999	Myth	Yarn
Sire Scat Daddy 2004	Love Style; 1999	Mr. Prospector	Raise a Native
Sire Scat Daddy 2004	Love Style; 1999	Mr. Prospector	Gold Digger
Sire Scat Daddy 2004	Love Style; 1999	Likeable Style	Nijinsky
Sire Scat Daddy 2004	Love Style; 1999	Likeable Style	Personable Lady
Dam Stage Magic 2007	Ghostzapper; 2000	Awesome Again	Deputy Minister
Dam Stage Magic 2007	Ghostzapper; 2000	Awesome Again	Primal Force
Dam Stage Magic 2007	Ghostzapper; 2000	Baby Zip	Relaunch
Dam Stage Magic 2007	Ghostzapper; 2000	Baby Zip	Thirty Zip
Dam Stage Magic 2007	Magical Illusion; 2001	Pulpit	A.P. Indy
Dam Stage Magic 2007	Magical Illusion; 2001	Pulpit	Preach
Dam Stage Magic 2007	Magical Illusion; 2001	Voodoo Lily	Baldski
Dam Stage Magic 2007	Magical Illusion; 2001	Voodoo Lily	Cap the Moment (family: 1-h)

Justify is linebred 3 x 5 x 5 to Mr. Prospector, meaning this sire appears once in the third generation of the pedigree and twice in the fifth-generation as the sire of full sisters Yarn and Preach. Justify is also line bred on Northern Dancer through Storm Cat, Yarn, Nijinsky, Deputy Minister, Preach, and Baldski. Further back, Justify's pedigree contains multiple line breedings on some of the greatest sires of the twentieth century, including Native Dancer, Nearco, and Man o' War.

Justify's pedigree includes several Triple Crown winners. He is a fifth generation descendant of Seattle Slew through A.P. Indy; a sixth generation descendant of Secretariat through both Storm Cat and A.P. Indy; descends from Count Fleet through Mr. Prospector and Primal Force, and has multiple crosses to War Admiral through Ogygian's daughter Myth, Personable Lady, and A.P. Indy. Even farther back in his pedigree are Omaha and Gallant Fox. Nijinsky, who appears several times in Justify's pedigree, won the English Triple Crown in 1970.

== See also ==
- List of racehorses

== See also ==
- List of leading Thoroughbred racehorses
- Media related to Justify (horse) at Wikimedia Commons
