= 2019 Breeders' Cup Classic =

Thoroughbred horse race

36th Breeders' Cup Classic
- Breeders' Cup Classic
- Location: Santa Anita Park
- Date: November 2, 2019
- Winning horse: Vino Rosso
- Winning time: 2:02.80
- Jockey: Irad Ortiz Jr.
- Trainer: Todd Pletcher
- Owner: Repole Stable and St. Elias Stable
- Conditions: fast
- Surface: Dirt
- Attendance: 67,811

The 2019 Breeders' Cup Classic was the 36th running of the Breeders' Cup Classic, part of the 2019 Breeders' Cup World Thoroughbred Championships program. It was run on November 2, 2019 at Santa Anita Park in Arcadia, California with a purse of $6,000,000. The race was won by Vino Rosso.

The Classic is run on dirt at one mile and one-quarter (approximately 2000 m). It is run under weight-for-age conditions, with entrants carrying the following weights:

- Northern Hemisphere three-year-olds: 122 lb
- Southern Hemisphere three-year-olds: 117 lb
- Four-year-olds and up: 126 lb
- Any fillies or mares receive a 3 lb allowance

The race was broadcast on NBC with a post time of 5:44 PM Pacific Daylight Time (PDT) – prime time on the East Coast.

== Contenders ==
Pre-entries for the 2019 Classic were announced on October 21 with the post position draw held on October 28.

The 2019 Classic was considered to be wide open, given that the major races in the division for both three-year-olds and older male horses were split between many contenders. The favorite was McKinzie, a 4-year-old colt who had finished either first or second in all of his starts in 2019, including a win in the Whitney Handicap. The top-ranked three-year-old in the race was Code of Honor, who had won the Travers Stakes and Jockey Club Gold Cup, the latter by disqualification. The mare Elate attempted to become just the second female horse to win the race, the other being Zenyatta in 2009.

The other entries were:

- Vino Rosso – won the Gold Cup at Santa Anita. disqualified to second in the Jockey Club Gold Cup
- Higher Power – won the Pacific Classic
- Yoshida – second in the Whitney, third in the Woodward
- Mongolian Groom – winner of the Awesome Again, defeating McKinzie
- Owendale – winner of the Ohio and Oklahoma Derbies, third in the Preakness Stakes
- Seeking the Soul – winner of the Stephen Foster
- War of Will – 2019 Preakness Stakes winner
- Math Wizard – winner of the Pennsylvania Derby

== Race description ==
War of Will went to the early lead and set moderate fractions, pressed by Mongolian Groom and McKinzie, who had to check strides a few times along the rail. Vino Rosso was a few lengths further back in fourth, then began his move on the far turn while racing three wide. McKinzie had also started his drive, moving to the lead at the head of the stretch. Vino Rosso gradually closed the gap to McKinzie, then pulled away in the final sixteenth of a mile to win by 4 1/4 lengths.

It was the first Breeders' Cup Classic win for all of Vino Rosso's connections: co-owners Mike Repole (Repole Stable) and Vince Viola (St Elias Stable), trainer Todd Pletcher and jockey Irad Ortiz Jr.

Pletcher felt that the colt's earlier win in the Gold Cup at Santa Anita, run over the same course and distance, was pivotal to his success in the Classic. "It gave us confidence that the horse handled the track", he said. "We had a blueprint in place that worked. So we tried to follow that pattern exactly, and we did."

Joel Rosario, who rode McKinzie, felt his horse simply got tired. "I let him run a little bit on the backside just to get my spot", he said. "That might have cost him a little bit. He ran his heart out, so we can't be too disappointed. We were just beaten by the best horse on the day."

Mongolian Groom suffered a severe injury to his left hind leg during the stretch run and was later euthanized. Santa Anita had instigated a number of changes to enhance equine safety after a troubling number of deaths during its winter/spring meeting. "It's something we were all very concerned about coming in", said Pletcher. "I think everyone took every possible precautionary measure."

== Results ==
Finish	Program Number	Horse	Jockey	Trainer	Morning Line Odds	Final Odds	Winnings	Margin
1	10	Vino Rosso	Irad Ortiz Jr.	Todd Pletcher	4-1	4.60	$3,300,000	4 1/4 lengths
2	8	McKinzie	Joel Rosario	Bob Baffert	3-1	2.90	$1,020,000	4 1/4 lengths
3	7	Higher Power	Flavien Prat	John Sadler	6-1	9.80	$540,000	8 1/2 lengths
4	6	Elate	José Ortiz	William Mott	6-1	9.30	300,000	10 3/4 lengths
5	1	Math Wizard	Ricardo Santana Jr.	Saffie Joseph Jr.	30-1	39.10	180,000	15 lengths
6	2	Seeking the Soul	Brian Hernandez Jr.	Dallas Stewart	20-1	37.90	60,000	15 1/4 lengths
7	11	Code of Honor	John Velazquez	Claude McGaughey III	4-1	3.70	60,000	15 1/4 lengths
8	5	Yoshida (JPN)	Mike Smith	William Mott	8-1	7.40	60,000	16 3/4 lengths
9	4	War of Will	Tyler Gaffalione	Mark Casse	20-1	16.00		19 3/4 lengths
10	3	Owendale	Javier Castellano	Brad H. Cox	15-1	14.50		22 1/2 lengths
DNF	9	Mongolian Groom	Abel Cedillo	Enebish Ganbat	12-1	15.60		DNF

Times: 1/4 – 23.09; 1/2 – 47.16; 3/4 – 1:10.71; mile – 1:36.35; final – 2:02.80.
Splits for each quarter-mile: (23.09) (24.07) (23.55) (25.64) (26.45)

Source: Equibase Chart

== Payout ==
Payout Schedule:

Program Number	Horse	Win	Place	Show
10	Vino Rosso	$11.20	$5.80	$4.00
8	McKinzie		$4.80	$3.60
7	Higher Power			$6.00

- $1 Exacta (10-8) Paid $23.80
- $1 Trifecta (10-8-7) Paid $197.00
- $1 Superfecta (10-8-7-6) Paid $1,213.00
