= Hofburg (horse) =

American Thoroughbred racehorse

- Hofburg before the 2018 Kentucky Derby
- Sire: Tapit
- Dam: Soothing Touch
- Damsire: Touch Gold
- Sex: Colt
- Foaled: February 11, 2015
- Country: United States
- Colour: Chestnut
- Breeder: Juddmonte Farms
- Owner: Juddmonte Farms
- Trainer: Bill Mott

Hofburg is a Thoroughbred racehorse foaled in 2015. He finished second in the 2018 Florida Derby, third in the 2018 Belmont Stakes, and seventh in the 2018 Kentucky Derby.
