= Just F Y I =

American-bred Thoroughbred racehorse

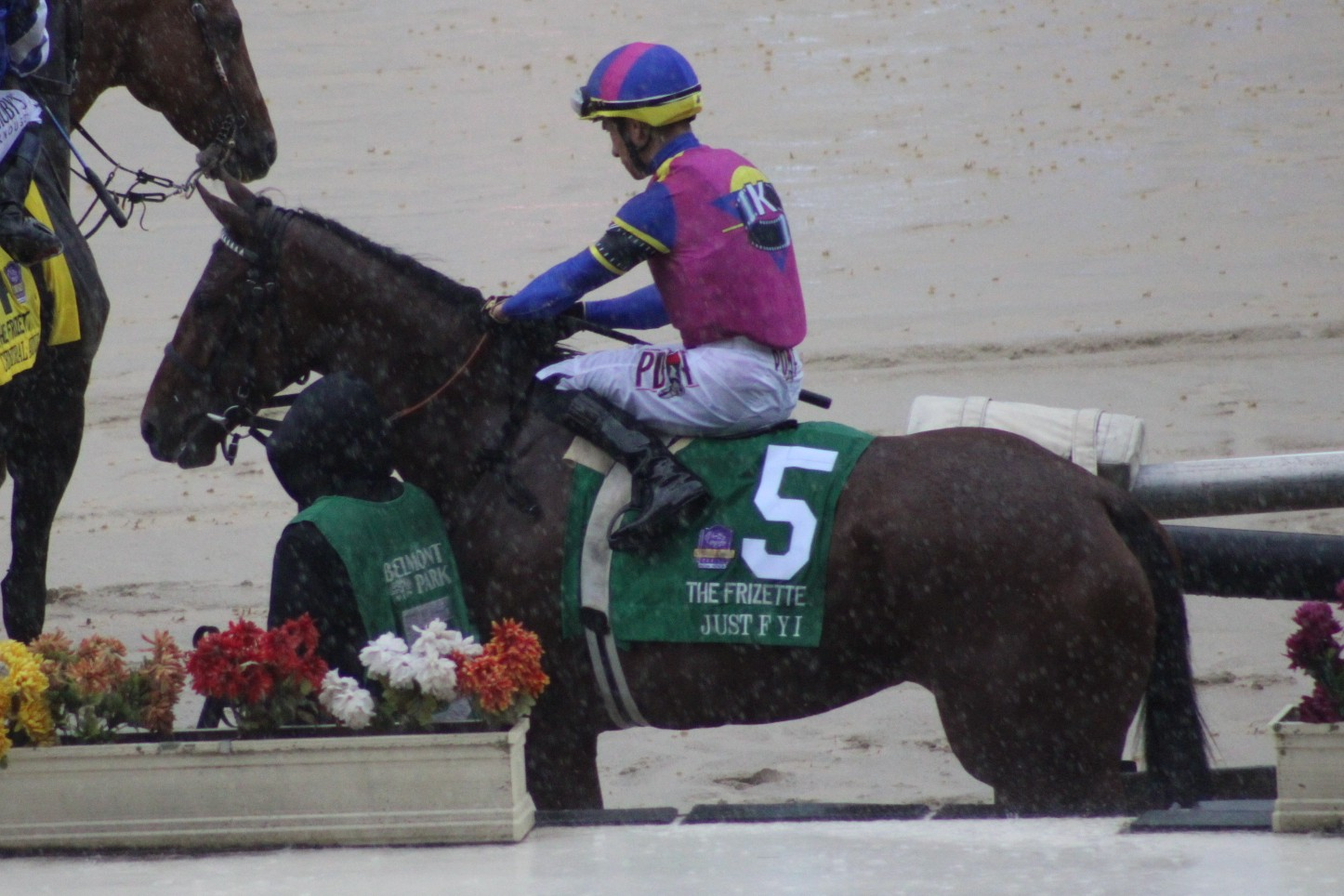
- Sire: Justify
- Grandsire: Scat Daddy
- Dam: Star Act
- Damsire: Street Cry
- Sex: Mare
- Foaled: April 13, 2021 (age 5)
- Country: United States
- Color: Bay
- Breeder: George Krikorian
- Owner: George Krikorian
- Trainer: William I. Mott
- Record: 6: 3 - 2 - 0
- Earnings: $1,711,250

Major wins
- Frizette Stakes (2023); Breeders' Cup wins: Breeders' Cup Juvenile Fillies (2023)

Awards
- American Champion Two-Year-Old Filly (2023)
- Last updated on June 8, 2024

Just F Y I (foaled April 13, 2021) is a champion American Thoroughbred racehorse. As a two-year-old filly, she won the Grade I Frizette Stakes and Breeders' Cup Juvenile Fillies at Santa Anita Park and was named the 2023 Champion Two-Year-Old Filly.

== Background ==
Just F Y I is a bay mare who was bred and owned by cinema mogul George Krikorian. She was bred in Kentucky. Just F Y I is out of stakes-placed dam and also bred and owned by Krikorian, Star Act, by Street Cry, who has produced three winners from three starters. Star Act is a daughter of Starrer, a two-time Grade 1 (Santa Maria Handicap and Santa Margarita Invitational Handicap) winner for George Krikorian. Her sire is the 2018 American Triple Crown winner, Justify. She is from Justify's second crop and was his first Breeders' Cup winner. Justify will stand the 2024 season for US$200,000 at Ashford Stud near Versailles, Kentucky.

Just F Y I is trained by U.S. Racing Hall of Fame trainer William I. Mott.

== Racing career ==
=== 2023: two-year-old season ===
Just F Y I debuted on August 26 in The Bacchus, a maiden special weight event for fillies at Saratoga. From post nine in a field of ten, she was five wide down the backstretch, then tucked three wide through the turn. She swung three to four wide into upper stretch, dug in under a drive, and wore down the leader, Shop Lifting, to win by a head in a time 1:11.06.

Connections next placed Just F Y I in the Grade I Frizette Stakes at Aqueduct Racetrack. On October 7, in a small field of six, she started as third favorite at odds of nearly 5/1. In the one-mile event with a purse of US$400,000, she raced off of the pace before swooping to the lead in the stretch on the sloppy and sealed racing surface, winning by 3 3/4 lengths in a time of 1:37.59. "This is very exciting, I've never had a single day where I've had two grade 1 winners before," owner Krikorian said. "That's pretty special, for sure. And Just F Y I is a horse I bred, so that makes it extra special." The victory earned her a fees-paid berth to the November 3 $2 million Grade I Breeders' Cup Juvenile Fillies Santa Anita Park.

For the Breeders' Cup Juvenile Fillies, Just F Y I drew post 12 under jockey Junior Alvarado, and stayed close while pressing the 4/5 odds-on favorite Tamara, the early leader, through a half-mile in :46.60 before turning up the pressure through six furlongs in 1:10.95. Just F Y I took command inside the three-sixteenths pole as Tamara faded. After opening a clear advantage, she held off Matron Stakes winner Jody's Pride, by a neck with GI Alcibiades Stakes winner Candied a half-length away in third. The winning time was 1:44.58.

A couple days after the event, trainer Bill Mott indicated that the next destination for Just F Y I likely would be the Payson Park Thoroughbred Training Center in Florida, where she would get time off before kicking off her 3-year-old campaign in 2024.

The filly was awarded an Eclipse Award as the Champion Two-Year-Old Filly for 2023.

=== 2024: three-year-old season ===
Just F Y I started her three-year-old with a second in the Grade I Ashland Stakes at Keeneland beaten by 3 lengths to Leslie's Rose.

== Statistics ==
Date	Distance	Race	Grade	Track	Odds	Field	Finish	Winning Time	Winning (Losing) Margin	Jockey	Ref
2023 – two-year-old season
Aug 26, 2023	6 furlongs	Maiden Special Weight		Saratoga	3.75	10	1	1:11.06	head	Junior Alvarado	
Oct 7, 2023	1 mile	Frizette Stakes	I	Aqueduct	4.80	6	1	1:37.59	3 3/4 lengths	Junior Alvarado	
Nov 3, 2023	1 1/16 miles	Breeders' Cup Juvenile Fillies	I	Santa Anita	7.00	12	1	1:44.58	neck	Junior Alvarado	
2024 – three-year-old season
Apr 5, 2024	1 1/16 miles	Ashland Stakes	I	Keeneland	4.63	8	2	1:43:85	(3 lengths)	Junior Alvarado	
May 3, 2024	1 1/8 miles	Kentucky Oaks	I	Churchill Downs	3.57*	14	2	1:50.83	(4 3/4 lengths)	Junior Alvarado	
Jun 7, 2024	1 1/8 miles	Acorn Stakes	I	Saratoga	3.10	8	6	1:49.02	(22 lengths)	Junior Alvarado	

Notes:
An (*) asterisk after the odds means Just F Y I was the post-time favorite.

== Pedigree ==
Pedigree of Just F Y I, bay filly, April 13,2021
Sire Justify (2015)	Scat Daddy (2004)	Johannesburg (1999)	Hennessy (1993)
Sire Justify (2015)	Scat Daddy (2004)	Johannesburg (1999)	Myth (1993)
Sire Justify (2015)	Scat Daddy (2004)	Love Style (1999)	Mr. Prospector (1970)
Sire Justify (2015)	Scat Daddy (2004)	Love Style (1999)	Likeable Style (1990)
Sire Justify (2015)	Stage Magic (2007)	Ghostzapper (2000)	Awesome Again (1994)
Sire Justify (2015)	Stage Magic (2007)	Ghostzapper (2000)	Baby Zip (1991)
Sire Justify (2015)	Stage Magic (2007)	Magical Illusion (2001)	Pulpit (1994)
Sire Justify (2015)	Stage Magic (2007)	Magical Illusion (2001)	Voodoo Lily (1987)
Dam Star Act (2011)	Street Cry (1998)	Machiavellian (1987)	Mr. Prospector (1970)
Dam Star Act (2011)	Street Cry (1998)	Machiavellian (1987)	Coup De Folie (1982)
Dam Star Act (2011)	Street Cry (1998)	Helen Street (GB) (1982)	Troy (GB) (1976)
Dam Star Act (2011)	Street Cry (1998)	Helen Street (GB) (1982)	Waterway (FR) (1976)
Dam Star Act (2011)	Starrer (1998)	Dynaformer (1985)	Roberto (1969)
Dam Star Act (2011)	Starrer (1998)	Dynaformer (1985)	Andover Way (1978)
Dam Star Act (2011)	Starrer (1998)	To The Hunt (1985)	Relaunch (1976)
Dam Star Act (2011)	Starrer (1998)	To The Hunt (1985)	Royal Advocator (1981) (family: 4-r)
