= McKinzie (horse) =

American Thoroughbred racehorse

- Sire: Street Sense
- Grandsire: Street Cry
- Dam: Runway Model
- Damsire: Petionville
- Sex: Stallion
- Foaled: 25 February 2015
- Country: United States
- Colour: Bay
- Breeder: Summer Wind Farm
- Owner: Karl Watson, Michael E. Pegram, Paul Weitman
- Trainer: Bob Baffert
- Record: 18: 8–6–0
- Earnings: US$ $3,453,560

Major wins
- Los Alamitos Futurity (2017); Sham Stakes (2018); Pennsylvania Derby (2018); Malibu Stakes (2018); Alysheba Stakes (2019); Whitney Stakes (2019); Triple Bend Stakes (2020)

McKinzie (foaled February 25, 2015) is a retired American Thoroughbred racehorse and breeding stallion who was a multiple graded stakes winner and came first or second in fourteen of his eighteen races.

== Background ==
McKinzie is sired by 2007 Kentucky Derby winner Street Sense and out of the graded stakes winning Petionville mare Runway Model. Through his dam, McKinzie is a descendant of Triple Crown winner Seattle Slew and was born at Summer Wind Farm in Georgetown Kentucky, home of, among others Littleprincessemma, Careless Jewel, and Eblouissante, a half sister to Zenyatta. McKinzie, a bay colt with a star and two rear half stockings, was sold at the 2016 Keeneland September Yearling Sale for $170,000 to The Three Amigos Racing Stable LLC, a partnership made up of Karl Watson, Michael E. Pegram, and Paul Weitman. Put into training in California with Bob Baffert, the Triple Crown winning trainer was allowed to name the horse, and he chose McKinzie after his longtime friend Brad McKinzie, who had previously worked as a racing executive and died in August 2017.

== Racing career ==
=== 2017: two-year-old season ===
McKinzie made his first start on October 28, 2017, in a $50,000 seven furlong maiden special weight at Santa Anita. Piloted by Mike Smith, McKinzie sat fifth in the first quarter mile, drew up to the front of the field and pulled away in the stretch to win by over five lengths in a time of 1:22.70 over He's Stylish and the favored Shivermetimbers. McKinzie's second start came just over a month later, on December 9 at Los Alamitos in the GI Los Alamitos Futurity. McKinzie crossed the wire three quarters of a length behind stablemate Solomini, but was awarded first place upon Solomini's disqualification with Instilled Regard finishing third. The win made McKinzie a Grade One winner in only his second start.

=== 2018: three-year-old season ===
McKinzie began his three-year-old season on January 6, 2018, in the GIII Sham Stakes at Santa Anita. Sent off as the heavy favorite, he hit the wire three and one half lengths clear of All Out Blitz, with My Boy Jack finishing third. McKinzie's next start came in the GII San Felipe on March 10, in a widely anticipated showdown with the highly regarded 2017 Eclipse Award finalist Bolt d'Oro. After a lengthy stretch battle, McKinzie crossed the finish line with his head in front, with third-place finisher Kanthaka over six lengths behind the two favorites. Due to bumping that occurred on the turn and in deep stretch, a lengthy inquiry ensured that included the stewards reviewing an objection from Bolt d'Oro's jockey Javier Castellano, with the result that McKinzie was disqualified to second place behind Bolt d'Oro. It was the final victory of his career. Baffert was upset with the steward's ruling, stating,

“That's some bullshit. Javier had a better story, I guess. I'm shocked, after the way he hit us at the top of the stretch. I don't know what they're looking at, but apparently he talked them into it. That's why they should never talk to the jockeys, just watch it themselves.”

Following the San Felipe, it was assumed that McKinzie would contest one final prep for the Kentucky Derby, likely either the Santa Anita Derby, the Arkansas Derby at Oaklawn Park, or the Blue Grass Stakes at Keeneland. The Santa Anita Derby was considered most likely, which would have meant a rematch with Bolt d'Oro, but in early April, Baffert announced that McKinzie was off the Derby trail with a hock issue.

"The x-rays were all clean. He did something in his hock. I think he jammed it. He was just a little off one morning when we were going to the track. There was no swelling or anything. He was fine the next day, but the nuke scan showed a little something in the hock. We’re just being cautious. With the Derby–every day he doesn’t go to the track, it’s not in his favor. Whatever is going on, we’re just going to let it heal on its own."

With McKinzie injured, Baffert opted to run eventual Triple Crown winner Justify in the Santa Anita Derby instead of the Arkansas Derby.

While McKinzie's initial prognosis had him listed as "unlikely" for the Preakness, leading some to believe he would be back in action by summer, several minor setbacks resulted in the colt missing the Preakness, Belmont, Haskell, and Travers. On September 22, 2018, having been away from the races for 196 days, McKinzie made his return in the GI Pennsylvania Derby at Parx, his first start outside of California. Sent off as the 2-1 favorite, he won by one and three quarter lengths over Axelrod, Trigger Warning, and Hofburg, with Core Beliefs, King Zachary, Bravazo, Mr. Freeze and Instilled Regard rounding out the order of finish. Following this victory, McKinzie was officially pointed toward the Breeder's Cup Classic on November 3, 2018. McKinzie arrived at Churchill Downs with the rest of the Baffert string early on Breeder's Cup week, often training at the same time as West Coast, Marley's Freedom, and 2017 Kentucky Oaks winner Abel Tasman. McKinzie was ridden in the Classic by Mike Smith, who had the alternative option of riding West Coast, another Baffert trainee who had run third to Gun Runner in the 2017 Classic. Smith chose McKinzie as West Coast would be retiring to Lane's End immediately afterward and McKinzie was slated to run at four. Drawing post 6 of 14, McKinzie pressed a hot pace set by fellow three-year-old Mendelssohn and tired after six furlongs, finishing 12th of 14 and beating only Catholic Boy and Roaring Lion. West Coast finished seventh. Before the race, Baffert admitted that the Classic would be a "tall order" for McKinzie and afterwards stated that he made a mistake entering him off of only one race in eight months.

Following the Breeder's Cup, McKinzie was given a brief break before being put into serious training for the GI Malibu on December 26, 2018, opening day at Santa Anita. Ridden again by Mike Smith and sent off at 6/5 odds as one of four Baffert trainees in the race, he uncharacteristically laid at the back of the field in 10th place of 14 after the first quarter mile. Moving up to 8th after the first half mile, McKinzie displayed a rapid turn of foot around the far turn and came down the center of the track in the stretch, drawing off to win by four and three quarter lengths over Identity Politics and Still Having Fun, with Axelrod finishing fourth. Smith did not use the whip on McKinzie for the length of the stretch. With his victory in the Malibu, McKinzie's earnings reached $1,086,000.

=== 2019: four-year-old season ===
Following his victory in the Malibu. On January 12, 2019, Bob Baffert announced that the colt was unlikely for the Pegasus, as his goal was for McKinzie to be the best older horse of 2019 and didn't want to ask him to do too much in the first month of the year. "He's the kind of horse that I can't be too hard on him, because he's light." Baffert listed the Santa Anita Handicap and Met Mile as spots in which he hoped to enter McKinzie in the first half of the year.

On February 2, McKinzie was sent off as the slight favorite and high weight over 2017 Breeder's Cup Dirt Mile winner Battle of Midway in the GII San Pasqual at Santa Anita. Pressing Giant Expectations in the early stages of the race, McKinzie took the lead coming into the stretch and was overtaken by Battle of Midway near the finish line, losing by a half length and 4 1/4 lengths ahead of third place Giant Expectations. Pavel was fourth, with Dalmore rounding out the order of finish. The race would turn out to be the final of Battle of Midway's career, as the horse suffered a fatal injury in training three weeks later.

On February 17, Baffert announced that McKinzie would make his next start in the Santa Anita Handicap on March 9. On March 2, McKinzie became one of seventeen horses nominated for the race. He was assigned the high weight of 123 pounds, with 2018 San Antonio Stakes winner Gift Box assigned 122. On March 4, Mckinzie worked six furlongs in 1:13.80 in his final workout for the contest. The following day, after the 21st fatal breakdown at the track since the meet started on December 26 (Battle Of Midway was the 18th), Santa Anita closed "indefinitely" until the cause of the fatalities could be discovered and fixed. On March 17, it was announced that live racing would resume at Santa Anita on March 29, and the Santa Anita Handicap was rescheduled for April 6.

McKinzie, drawing the rail for the Santa Anita Handicap and again carrying more weight than the rest of the field, stalked the pace set by Gift Box and Prime Attraction. He approached Gift Box at the top of the stretch and the two slowly drew away from the rest of the field, hitting the wire in a photo finish. Upon examination of the photo, Gift Box was determined to be the winner. McKinzie was well clear of third place Mongolian Groom.

On April 17, Baffert announced that McKinzie, Marley's Freedom, and Mother Mother would be among his horses shipping back to Churchill Downs to run on Kentucky Derby weekend, with McKinzie aiming to use the Alysheba Stakes on May 3, Kentucky Oaks day, as a prep for the Met Mile in June. On April 27, McKinzie worked five furlongs in a bullet 58.60. Breaking from the rail in an eight horse field in the Alysheba, McKinzie broke second behind Tom's d'Etat and took the lead on the backstretch with six furlongs to go. With a half mile remaining in the race, Tom's d'Etat took over the lead and Bourbon Resolution followed, McKinzie falling back to third. Mike Smith took McKinzie outside of Tom's d'Etat and regained the lead at the top of the stretch, and McKinzie opened up on the field, hitting the wire clear of the rest of the field under a hand ride and in a final time of 1:41.10.

After the Alysheba, Baffert confirmed that his next plan for McKinzie was the Met Mile on Belmont Stakes Day. McKinzie was set to carry the co-high weight of 124 pounds along with two time Dubai World Cup winner Thunder Snow. The #2 slot for McKinzie in a one turn mile was a concern expressed by NBC broadcasters, as McKinzie did not like being inside of horses. The horse ran into traffic trouble, with the official chart stating

"...having been caught behind a wall of equines, was about three wide at the commencement of the stretch run, still lacking room of any sort with which to launch a rally of his own, checked when in close proximity to the heels of Thunder Snow just inside the eighth pole, was then steadied a few strides later when beaten to position by the same opponent, angled into a firm fit on path two right afterwards, attaining racing clearance for the first time during the stretch drive, kicked in willingly when given his cue, split foes late and got up for the place."

Mitole was the winner, finishing less than a length ahead of McKinzie and extending the winning streak that he had begun in March 2018 to seven straight races. Thunder Snow was third. For his second-place finish, McKinzie earned $220,000, his career earnings amounting to $1,642,910.

After the Met Mile, McKinzie returned to California, with his next start expected to be the GI Whitney at Saratoga on August 3. On July 17 at Del Mar, McKinzie worked six furlongs in 1:12. He worked four furlongs in 48 seconds flat on July 29 before shipping to the Spa. McKinzie drew post six in a field of eight, sharing the high weight of 124 pounds with Thunder Snow, Vino Rosso, and Yoshida. Preservationist was assigned 122 pounds, Monongahela 120, and Imperative and Forewarned 118. During a Barstool pizza review with Todd Pletcher, trainer of Vino Rosso, the subject of jinxing a horse by betting on him came up, to which Pletcher suggested, "bet on McKinzie, help us out."

The morning of the Whitney, Thunder Snow was scratched, leaving a field of seven. McKinzie briefly took the lead at the start of the race, and then settled in second behind Preservationist for the first three quarters of a mile. Yoshida, Vino Rosso, and Monongahela approached him in their bid for the lead going around the turn. With most of the field spread across the track, McKinzie took the lead and turned back a flying Yoshida to cross the line 1 3/4 lengths in front in a final time of 1:47.10, under a hand ride and less than half a second off the track record set by Lawyer Ron. It was Bob Baffert's first victory in the race. Speaking about the horse and race, Matt Dinerman said

McKinzie is another example of a stallion prospect that is allowed to race at 4, and has gotten better with growth, both physically and mentally. He’s better than ever right now and is all racehorse, running hard and kicking away after real good horses swarmed up to him.

Vino Rosso was third, nearly five lengths behind Yoshida, then came Preservationist, Forewarned, Monongahela, and Imperative.

McKinzie returned to California to prepare for his next start, the G1 Awesome Again at Santa Anita. Breaking from post four in a six horse field, McKinzie rated off of Mongolian Groom, Isotherm, and Draft Pick. McKinzie easily drew up even with Mongolian Groom at the top of the stretch, but the latter rallied again, keeping McKinzie at bay and hitting the line 2 1/4 lengths ahead. McKinzie was 5 1/4 lengths in front of the third place horse, Higher Power, followed by Seeking the Soul, Draft Pick, and Isotherm. Following the race, Bob Baffert announced that Mike Smith would not have the mount on McKinzie in the Breeder's Cup. Joel Rosario was named as the replacement.

McKinzie resumed preparations for the Breeder's Cup Classic on October 10, with a four furlong work in 49.40. Over the next two weeks, the workouts grew longer, six furlongs in 1:12.80 on October 16 and seven furlongs in 1:24.40 on the 22nd. Distance was the question for the majority, as McKinzie had lost his only two starts at ten furlongs, and he had just been upset by Mongolian Groom in the Awesome Again. Steve Haskin published an article on Bloodhorse on October 23, arguing that perhaps McKinzie is ready to get that elusive win at a mile and a quarter, due to his sire Street Sense winning at the distance twice, the conditioning McKinzie obtained in the Awesome Again, and the way he hugged the rail - as opposed to drifting, as horses usually do when tired - at the end of his seven furlong work.

The 2019 Breeder's Cup Classic took place on November 2 at Santa Anita park, with a field of eleven. Settling off of pacesetter War of Will, McKinzie made a bid for the lead around the far turn and was the first horse to reach the stretch, a narrow half length in front of Vino Rosso. Vino Rosso overtook McKinzie in the stretch and crossed the wire four and one quarter lengths in front. McKinzie was another four and one quarter lengths ahead of Higher Power in third. The lone mare in the race, Elate, finished fourth. The race was marred by the breakdown of Mongolian Groom, who had to be euthanized. The sires of Vino Rosso and McKinzie, (Curlin and Street Sense, respectively), were rivals from the 2004 foal crop, with Street Sense winning the 2007 Kentucky Derby and Curlin winning the 2007 Preakness. Curlin went on to win the Breeder's Cup Classic that year (with Street Sense fourth), his son Vino Rosso replicating that feat twelve years later.

The week before the Classic, Bob Baffert stated that the plan was for McKinzie to continue to race as a five-year-old, providing he stayed healthy. In preparation for his five-year-old season, McKinzie returned to the work tab on December 6, 2019, just over a month after the Breeder's Cup.

=== 2020: five-year-old season ===
McKinzie shipped to Saudi Arabia on February 18, 2020, for the inaugural Saudi Cup, to be run on the 29th. On February 26, McKinzie drew post nine in the fourteen horse field. The four U.S. owned horses would line up together, with champion mare Midnight Bisou in post six, 2019 Champion Three Year Old Maximum Security in post seven, Pegasus World Cup winner Mucho Gusto in post eight, and McKinzie in post nine.

In the Saudi Cup, McKinzie raced behind a wall of horses down the rail and made only moderate progress when asked to run. Jockey Joel Rosario eased him up in the stretch and they crossed the line 11th of 14, beating Great Scot, North America, and Capezzano. Maximum Security was the winner over Midnight Bisou in second. Bob Baffert reported that McKinzie came out of the race fine and simply didn't fire, and declared the horse out of the Dubai World Cup. The 2020 Dubai World Cup was ultimately cancelled due to safety concerns surrounding COVID-19.

On April 27, 2020, McKinzie had his first work since the Saudi Cup, covering four easy furlongs at Santa Anita in 49.40 seconds. On May 3, he worked four furlongs in 47:80, the second fastest of 18 for the distance. On May 9, he worked the same distance in the exact same time. On May 21, 2020, following a six furlong bullet work in 1:11.20, Baffert announced that McKinzie would make his first domestic start of the year in the seven furlong Triple Bend Stakes at Santa Anita. McKinzie put in two final works for the race, five furlongs in 1:00.00 and then four in 47.20.

Entered in the Triple Bend alongside McKinzie were Flagstaff, a half brother to Game Winner who was the champion two-year-old of 2018 and was born at Summer Wind like McKinzie, and Ax Man, Dark Vader, and Fashionably Fast. Following two starts with Joel Rosario in the saddle, neither of which resulted in a win, Mike Smith had the mount once again, and he settled McKinzie near the back of the small field before making his move on the turn. Fashionably Fast briefly stuck with him, but McKinzie effortlessly drew off to a 1 1/2 length victory with a hand ride.

His next start was the Metropolitan Handicap at Belmont Park on July 4, 2020. Breaking from the #3 post position, McKinzie wound up four wide on the turn and in the five path during the stretch, and lacked his usual kick, finishing fifth, though only two lengths behind the winner, Vekoma. After the race, it was discovered that McKinzie lost both his right front and right hind shoes near the start of the race.

Following the Met Mile, McKinzie was initially considered for the Whitney, a race he'd won in 2019, but ultimately it was decided to keep him in California to run in the G1 Bing Crosby Stakes at Del Mar, a Win and You're In for the Breeder's Cup Sprint. McKinzie ultimately did not enter that race. On August 23, it was announced that he would be heading to Churchill Downs to defend his title in the Alysheba.

The 2020 Alysheba Stakes took place on Friday, September 4, 2020. McKinzie drew the #2 hole in a field reduced to six. Pinned down at the rail through a very slow half mile, McKinzie struggled for racing room coming into the stretch and flattened out when clear, finishing fourth behind By My Standards, Owendale, and Silver Dust, though only a couple lengths behind the winner. It would be the final race of the horse's career.

== Stallion career ==
On June 23, 2020, it was announced that upon his eventual retirement from racing, McKinzie would stand at Gainesway in Lexington, Kentucky. The horse was formally retired on October 7 of that same year, and will stand his first season at stud for $30,000 in 2021.

=== Notable progeny ===
c = colt, f = filly, g = gelding

Foaled	Name	Sex	Major Wins
2022	Chancer McPatrick	c	Hopeful Stakes, Champagne Stakes
2022	Baeza	c	Pennsylvania Derby
2022	Scottish Lassie	f	Frizette Stakes, Coaching Club American Oaks
2022	Hymn	g	Forego Stakes

== Pedigree ==
Pedigree of McKinzie(USA), 2015
Sire Street Sense (USA)	Street Cry (IRE)	Machiavellian (USA)	Mr. Prospector (USA)
Sire Street Sense (USA)	Street Cry (IRE)	Machiavellian (USA)	Coup De Folie (USA)
Sire Street Sense (USA)	Street Cry (IRE)	Helen Street (GB)	Troy (GB)
Sire Street Sense (USA)	Street Cry (IRE)	Helen Street (GB)	Waterway (FR)
Sire Street Sense (USA)	Bedazzle (USA)	Dixieland Band (USA)	Northern Dancer (CAN)
Sire Street Sense (USA)	Bedazzle (USA)	Dixieland Band (USA)	Mississippi Mud (USA)
Sire Street Sense (USA)	Bedazzle (USA)	Majestic Legend (USA)	His Majesty (USA)
Sire Street Sense (USA)	Bedazzle (USA)	Majestic Legend (USA)	Long Legend (USA)
Dam Runway Model (USA)	Petionville (USA)	Seeking the Gold (USA)	Mr. Prospector (USA)
Dam Runway Model (USA)	Petionville (USA)	Seeking the Gold (USA)	Con Game (USA)
Dam Runway Model (USA)	Petionville (USA)	Vana Turns (USA)	Wavering Monarch (USA)
Dam Runway Model (USA)	Petionville (USA)	Vana Turns (USA)	The Wheel Turns
Dam Runway Model (USA)	Ticket to Houston (USA) (USA)	Houston (USA)	Seattle Slew (USA)
Dam Runway Model (USA)	Ticket to Houston (USA) (USA)	Houston (USA)	Smart Angle (USA)
Dam Runway Model (USA)	Ticket to Houston (USA) (USA)	Stave (USA)	Navajo (USA)
Dam Runway Model (USA)	Ticket to Houston (USA) (USA)	Stave (USA)	Worden Lady (GB)
