= 2018 Preakness Stakes =

143rd running of the Preakness Stakes

143rd Preakness Stakes
- Preakness Stakes
- Grade I stakes race
- "The Middle Jewel of the Triple Crown" "The Run for the Black-Eyed Susans"
- Location: Pimlico Race Course; Baltimore, United States
- Date: May 19, 2018
- Distance: 1 3/16 mi (9.5 furlongs; 1,900 m)
- Winning horse: Justify
- Winning time: 1:55.93
- Final odds: 0.40–1
- Jockey: Mike E. Smith
- Trainer: Bob Baffert
- Owner: China Horse Club, Head of Plains Partners, Starlight Racing, WinStar Farm
- Conditions: Sloppy
- Surface: Dirt
- Attendance: ▼134,487

The 2018 Preakness Stakes was the 143rd running of the Preakness Stakes, the second leg of the American Triple Crown. It was a Grade I stakes race with a purse of $1.5 million for three-year-old Thoroughbreds at a distance of 1 3/16 miles (1.9 km). It was held on May 19, 2018, at Pimlico Race Course in Baltimore, Maryland and was broadcast on NBC from 5:00 pm to 7:15 pm EDT with coverage of the undercard on NBCSN starting at 2:30 pm.

It was a very muddy track and extremely foggy at post time with visibility down to a sixteenth of a mile. Out of the gate, Justify went to the early lead while Good Magic rushed up his inside to challenge. The two matched strides for the first mile before Good Magic tired somewhat down the stretch. Justify held off a fast closing Bravazo to win by half a length, keeping alive his hopes of winning the Triple Crown. The Maryland Jockey Club reported a track record total attendance of 134,487, the second highest attendance for American thoroughbred racing events in North America during 2018.

== Field ==
Entries for the 2018 Preakness were taken on May 16. As is commonly the case with the Preakness, the field for the race featured the winner and other top horses from the Kentucky Derby, facing off with several "new shooters" – horses who either did not qualify for the Derby or whose connections chose to bypass that race to focus on the Preakness.

The heavy favorite for the race was Justify, the 2018 Kentucky Derby winner, even though he bruised his heel during the running of that race. His main rival was Good Magic, the champion two-year-colt of 2017 and runner-up in the Derby. Six other horses completed the field: Quip, winner of the Tampa Bay Derby and second in the Arkansas Derby, bypassed the Kentucky Derby to focus on the Preakness; Bravazo (sixth in the Derby); Lone Sailor (eighth); Diamond King (winner of the Federico Tesio Stakes); Sporting Chance (fourth in the Blue Grass Stakes); and Tenfold (fifth in the Arkansas Derby).

== Race description ==
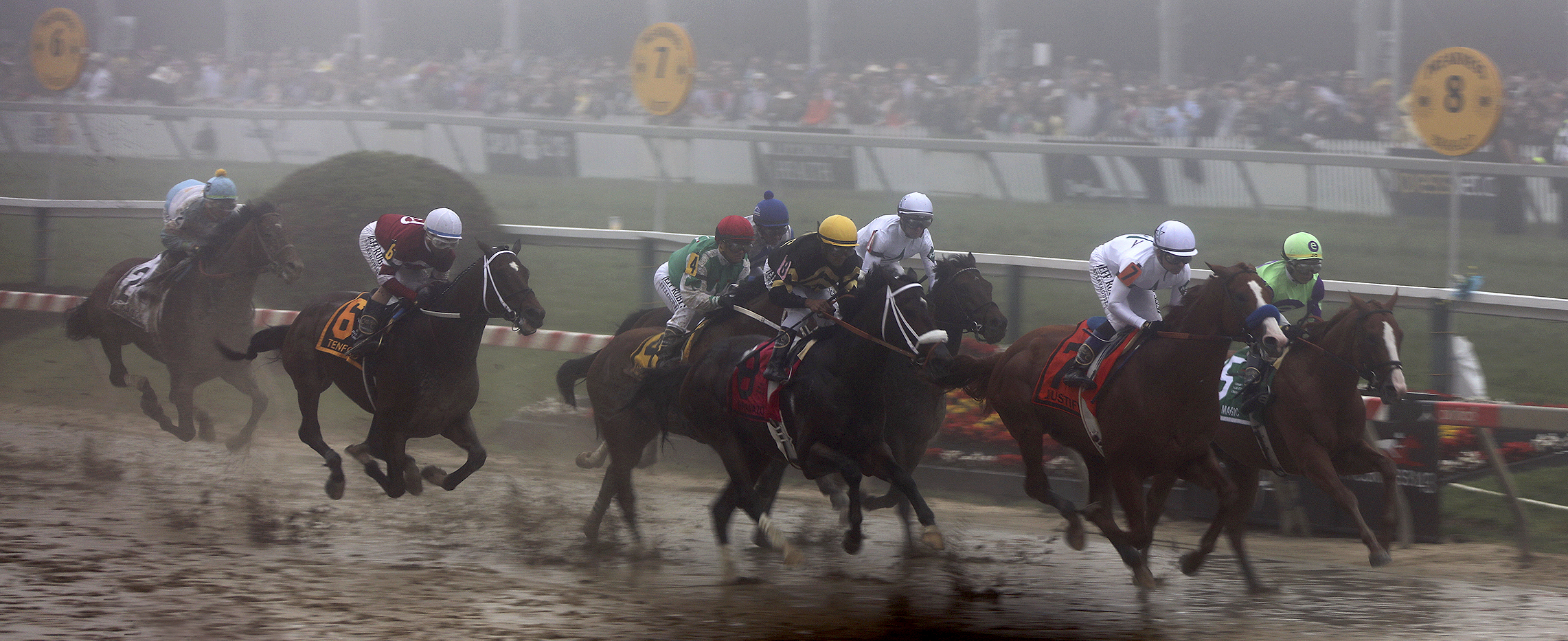
Justify leads Good Magic past the stands for the first time in the 2018 Preakness

The conditions for the race were so poor that the Washington Post jokingly said the track "should have been downgraded from 'sloppy' to 'biblical'". After heavy downpours over several days, the rain finally stopped shortly before the race but then a heavy fog descended, limiting visibility to about a sixteenth of a mile. Despite the weather, a crowd of 134,487 watched at the track, the third-largest attendance in history. Total wagering on the race was a record $61.97 million, boosted by increases in wagering on exotics such as the trifecta and superfecta. The NBC broadcast received a 5.5 overnight rating and 12 share, a 12% increase over 2017. The ratings during the race itself peaked at 6.6 overnight with a 15 share.

The start was critical, and Justify broke well to take the early lead. To his inside, Good Magic rushed up to challenge and the two matched strides around the first turn and down the backstretch while setting moderate fractions. They picked up the pace rounding the final turn and opened a gap on the rest of the field. However, in mid-stretch, Tenfold started closing ground rapidly to Justify's outside while Bravazo, who had trailed by five lengths in mid-stretch, was moving fastest of all in the center of the track. Justify dug in to win by half a length over Bravazo, with Tenfold just a neck further back in third, another neck in front of Good Magic.

It was a record-tying seventh win of the Preakness for Justify's trainer, Bob Baffert. Five of those wins came with horses who had just won the Kentucky Derby: Silver Charm, Real Quiet, War Emblem and American Pharoah. Of these, only American Pharoah went on to complete the Triple Crown by winning the Belmont Stakes. Justify later duplicated this feat in the 2018 Belmont Stakes, making Baffert only the second person to train two Triple Crown winners.

== Results ==
Finish	PP	Horse	Jockey	Trainer	Morning line odds	Final odds	Margin (lengths)	Winnings
1	7	Justify	Mike E. Smith	Bob Baffert	1-2	0.40		$900,000
2	8	Bravazo	Luis Saez	D. Wayne Lukas	20-1	15.30	1/2	$300,000
3	6	Tenfold	Ricardo Santana Jr.	Steve Asmussen	20-1	26.10	3/4	$165,000
4	5	Good Magic	José Ortiz	Chad Brown	3-1	3.90	1	$90,000
5	2	Lone Sailor	Irad Ortiz Jr.	Tom Amoss	15-1	13.80	2	$45,000
6	3	Sporting Chance	Luis Contreras	D. Wayne Lukas	30-1	23.30	10 3/4	
7	4	Diamond King	Javier Castellano	John Servis	30-1	20.70	12 1/4	
8	1	Quip	Florent Geroux	Rodolphe Brisset	12-1	12.50	45 1/2	

- Winning owner: China Horse Club, Head of Plains Partners, Starlight Racing, WinStar Farm
- Winning breeder: John D. Gunther
- Track: Sloppy

Times: 1/4 mile – 0:23.11; 1/2 mile – 0:47.19; 3/4 mile – 1:11.42; mile – 1:36.10; final – 1:55.93.
Splits for each quarter-mile: (:23.11) (:24.08) (:24.23) (:24.68) (:19.83 for final 3/16)

Reference: Equibase Chart

== Payout ==
The 143rd Preakness payout schedule

Pgm	Horse	Win	Place	Show
7	Justify	$2.80	$2.80	$2.60
8	Bravazo	–	$7.60	$4.80
6	Tenfold	–	–	$6.80

- $2 Exacta (7–8) $27.40
- $1 Trifecta (7–8–6) $148.30
- $1 Superfecta (7–8–6–5) $372.50
- $1 Super High Five (7–8–6–5–2) $1,370.20

== See also ==
- 2018 Kentucky Derby
- 2018 Belmont Stakes
