= Bolt d'Oro =

American-bred Thoroughbred racehorse

- Sire: Medaglia d'Oro
- Grandsire: El Prado (IRE)
- Dam: Globe Trot
- Damsire: A.P. Indy
- Sex: Colt
- Foaled: March 17, 2015
- Country: United States
- Colour: Bay
- Breeder: WinStar Farm
- Owner: Ruis Racing LLC
- Trainer: Mick Ruis
- Record: 8: 4-1-1
- Earnings: $1,016,000

Major wins
- Del Mar Futurity (2017); FrontRunner Stakes (2017); San Felipe Stakes (2018)

Bolt d'Oro (foaled March 17, 2015) is an American Thoroughbred racehorse. At age two, he won his first three starts, including the Del Mar Futurity and FrontRunner Stakes, before finishing third in the Breeders' Cup Juvenile. He started his three-year-old campaign by winning the San Felipe Stakes by disqualification and finishing second in the Santa Anita Derby. One of the early favorites for the 2018 Kentucky Derby, he finished twelfth in that race.

== Background ==
Bolt d'Oro was bred in Kentucky by WinStar Farm. He was sired by Medaglia d'Oro, winner of the Travers Stakes and fourth in the 2002 Kentucky Derby. As a sire, Medaglia d'Oro is best known as the sire of Hall of Fame inductee Rachel Alexandra and multiple Eclipse Award winner Songbird. Bolt d'Oro was the second foal out of Globe Trot, a daughter of A.P. Indy. Her first foal, Sonic Mule, was also a stakes winner.

Bolt d'Oro was sold at the 2016 Fasig-Tipton yearling sale for $630,000 to Mick Ruis, who is also the colt's trainer. Ruis sent the colt to Ike Green at his Montana ranch for breaking and early training. The colt's name is a tribute to sprinter Usain Bolt, who was competing at the 2016 Olympics at the same time the colt was being prepared for his first ride. Green noted that the horse, like the sprinter, made everything look effortless and easy. "If you've been riding cheap horses all your life, and old claimers you're trying to patch up, you know the difference between one like him and those," said Green.

== Racing career ==
=== 2017: two-year-old season ===
Bolt d'Oro joined Mick Ruis's stable in the spring of 2017 and posted his first workout on May 11. He caught the attention of handicappers with a workout on July 22 of 59 seconds flat for 5 furlongs – the best time of 93 such workouts on the day. As a result, he was the odds-on favorite for his first start in a maiden special weight race at Del Mar on August 5. He broke poorly but quickly made his way through the field and dueled for the early lead. In the stretch, he responded to a challenge from Bank Walker to draw off for a 2 1/4-length win.

Ruis then stepped Bolt d'Oro up in class for the Grade I Del Mar Futurity on September 4. He again broke poorly, settling near the back of the field behind a fast early pace. The colt started to make up ground while racing wide around the turn, then dueled with Zatter down the stretch. He drew clear near the wire to win by three-quarters of a length with the favorite, Run Away, well back in third.

On September 30, Bolt d'Oro entered the FrontRunner Stakes at Santa Anita Park as the odds-on favorite in a field of nine. He broke well and stalked the early pace set by Take the One O One. He took the lead turning into the stretch and continued to draw away, winning by 7 3/4 lengths over Solomini.

Bolt d'Oro made his final start of the year in the Breeders' Cup Juvenile at Del Mar on November 4. Once again the odds-on favorite, he stumbled at the start and fell well behind the early leaders, then had to check in heavy traffic. Around the final turn, he swung extremely wide to find racing room and started to make up ground rapidly. However, he could not close down the early advantage of Good Magic, who won by 4 1/2 lengths, and Solomini, who finished a length ahead of Bolt d'Oro in second.

In the Eclipse Award voting for American Champion Two-Year-Old Male Horse, Bolt d'Oro finished second to Good Magic by 18 votes. The two horses were given an equal rating of 126 pounds in The Jockey Club's juvenile rankings, formerly known as the Experimental Free Handicap.

=== 2018: three-year-old season ===
Bolt d'Oro's three-year-old debut was delayed by some body soreness in early January. Ruis bypassed the early prep races in February to give the colt more time to recover. He also changed jockeys from Corey Nakatani, who had ridden the colt in all of his two-year-old races, to Javier Castellano.

On March 10, Bolt d'Oro entered the San Felipe Stakes, in which he was the slight favorite over the undefeated McKinzie. Lombo went to the early lead, followed closely by McKinzie with Bolt d'Oro a few lengths back in fourth. On the final turn, Bolt d'Oro made his move on the outside while Lombo dropped back. Rounding into the stretch, Bolt d'Oro bumped with McKinzie, then pulled into the lead. After nearly going into the rail, McKinzie rallied and the two horses battled down the stretch. In the final sixteenth of a mile, McKinzie started to bear out into Bolt d'Oro's path and the two bumped again. McKinzie crossed the line a head in front but was disqualified to second. The stewards felt that the fault for the first contact near the head of the stretch was inconclusive: one camera angle showed that McKinzie may have caused the problem by bearing out, while the other angle showed that Bolt d'Oro may have been at fault for bearing in. However, McKinzie was clearly at fault in the second incident and the stewards felt that the interference was enough to have cost Bolt d'Oro the race.

The win moved Bolt d'Oro to the top of the NTRA three-year-old poll with 29 first place votes, followed closely by McKinzie. Veteran sportswriter Steve Haskin called them "two exceptional colts who ran their hearts out, got a lot out of the race, and are for now clear-cut favorites for the Run for the Roses."

The Santa Anita Derby, held on April 7, attracted a field of seven. Trainer Bob Baffert was originally planning to enter McKinzie for a rematch against Bolt d'Oro but withdrew the colt due to a minor injury. Instead Baffert entered Justify, who had won his first two starts and was facing stakes company for the first time. Justify went to the early lead and set easy fractions, opening up three lengths on Bolt d'Oro down the backstretch in what was essentially a match race. Bolt d'Oro was put to a drive as they rounded the final turn and closed to within a length and a half before Justify again drew away for a three-length win.

On May 5, Bolt d'Oro entered the 2018 Kentucky Derby as one of the favorites. He raced a few lengths behind a fast early pace set by Promises Fulfilled and Justify, then tried to close ground while going wide around the far turn. Justify repelled the challenge and won the race, while Bolt d'Oro faded to finish twelfth.

Rather than facing Justify again, Ruis entered Bolt d'Oro in the prestigious Metropolitan Handicap (popularly known as the Met Mile) against older horses. Bolt d'Oro challenged Bee Jersey for the early lead but was unable to maintain the pace and tailed off to finish last.

Bolt d'Oro was subsequently transferred to the stable of Steve Asmussen, who gave the colt some time off after the spring campaign. He was expected to return to racing in the late fall but returned sore from an October workout and was subsequently retired. "He went to the top races, and we had to go against big barns that had 30-40 precocious horses," Ruis said. "He danced with all of them. He was an incredible horse."

==== Santa Anita Derby lawsuit ====
Bolt d'Oro's owner, Mick Ruis, filed a lawsuit in January 2020 against the California Horse Racing Board (CHRB) following reports that Justify won the 2018 Santa Anita Derby with the drug scopolamine in his system. In 2018, a scopolamine positive would have resulted in a disqualification, which in this case would elevate Bolt d'Oro to first place and the $600,000 winner's share of the purse. Ruis alleged that the CHRB dismissed the matter behind closed doors and failed to discharge their responsibilities under California law, while CHRB's equine medical director had suggested that evidence concerning high number of such violations pointed to feed contamination. After several years of continuing litigation, in December 2023 the Los Angeles Superior Court ruled in favor of Ruis and ordered the CHRB to issue a ruling that would effectively disqualify Justify and promote Bolt d'Oro to first place. The CHRB said after the ruling that they were weighing their legal options.

== Retirement ==
Bolt d'Oro was retired to stud at Spendthrift Farm, where he will stand the 2019 season for $25,000. On February 27, 2019, his first mare was confirmed in foal. On March 5, Lotta Kim, dam of 2009 Horse of the Year Rachel Alexandra, was covered by Bolt d'Oro.

=== Notable progeny ===
c = colt, f = filly, g = gelding

Foaled	Name	Sex	Major Wins
2020	From Dusk	c	CBC Sho (2026)
2021	Tamara	f	Del Mar Debutante (2023)

== Statistics ==
Date	Age	Distance	Race	Grade	Track	Odds	Field	Finish	Winning Time	Margin	Jockey	Ref
Aug 5, 2017	2	6 1/2 furlongs	Maiden Special Weight	Maiden	Del Mar	0.80*	10	1	1:17.92	11 1/2 lengths	Corey Nakatani	
Sep 4, 2017	2	7 furlongs	Del Mar Futurity	I	Del Mar	3.90	9	1	1:22.91	3/4 length	Corey Nakatani	
Sep 30, 2017	2	1 1/16 miles	FrontRunner Stakes	I	Santa Anita	0.90*	9	1	1:43.54	7 3/4 lengths	Corey Nakatani	
Nov 4, 2017	2	1 1/16 miles	Breeders' Cup Juvenile	I	Del Mar	0.70*	12	3	1:43.34	(5 1/4) lengths)	Corey Nakatani	
Mar 10, 2018	3	1 1/16 miles	San Felipe Stakes	II	Santa Anita	1.00*	7	1 (Note: McKinzie finished first but was disqualified for interference in upper and late stretch and was placed second. Bolt d'Oro who had finished second was promoted and declared the winner)	1:42.71	(head)	Javier Castellano	
Apr 7, 2018	3	1 1/8 miles	Santa Anita Derby	I	Santa Anita	1.10	7	1	1:49.72	3 lengths	Javier Castellano	
May 5, 2018	3	1 1/4 miles	Kentucky Derby	I	Churchill Downs	8.90	20	12	2:04.20	(24 1/4 lengths)	Victor Espinoza	
June 9, 2018	3	1 mile	Metropolitan Handicap	I	Belmont Park	5.40	11	11	1:33.13	(21 lengths)	Florent Geroux	

An asterisk after the odds means Bolt d'Oro was the post-time favorite.

== Pedigree ==
Pedigree of Bolt d'Oro, bay colt, foaled March 17, 2015
Sire Medaglia d'Oro 1999	El Prado (IRE); 1989	Sadler's Wells	Northern Dancer
Sire Medaglia d'Oro 1999	El Prado (IRE); 1989	Sadler's Wells	Fairy Bridge
Sire Medaglia d'Oro 1999	El Prado (IRE); 1989	Lady Capulet	Sir Ivor
Sire Medaglia d'Oro 1999	El Prado (IRE); 1989	Lady Capulet	Cap and Bells
Sire Medaglia d'Oro 1999	Cappucino Bay; 1989	Bailjumper	Damascus
Sire Medaglia d'Oro 1999	Cappucino Bay; 1989	Bailjumper	Court Circuit
Sire Medaglia d'Oro 1999	Cappucino Bay; 1989	Dubbed In	Silent Screen
Sire Medaglia d'Oro 1999	Cappucino Bay; 1989	Dubbed In	Society Singer
Dam Globe Trot 2008	A.P. Indy; 1989	Seattle Slew	Bold Reasoning
Dam Globe Trot 2008	A.P. Indy; 1989	Seattle Slew	My Charmer
Dam Globe Trot 2008	A.P. Indy; 1989	Weekend Surprise	Secretariat
Dam Globe Trot 2008	A.P. Indy; 1989	Weekend Surprise	Lassie Dear
Dam Globe Trot 2008	Trip; 1997	Lord at War (ARG)	General (FR)
Dam Globe Trot 2008	Trip; 1997	Lord at War (ARG)	=Luna de Miel
Dam Globe Trot 2008	Trip; 1997	Tour	Forty Niner
Dam Globe Trot 2008	Trip; 1997	Tour	Fun Flight (family: 13-c)

Bolt d'Oro has no inbreeding through the first five generations of his pedigree.
