= 2018 Kentucky Derby =

Horse race

144th Kentucky Derby
- Kentucky Derby
- Grade I stakes race
- Logo for the 2018 Kentucky Derby
- Location: Churchill Downs; Louisville, Kentucky, United States
- Date: May 5, 2018
- Winning horse: Justify
- Winning time: 2:04.20
- Starting price: 2.90/1
- Jockey: Mike Smith
- Trainer: Bob Baffert
- Owner: China Horse Club, Head of Plains Partners, Starlight Racing, WinStar Farm
- Conditions: Sloppy (sealed)
- Surface: Dirt
- Attendance: 157,813

The 2018 Kentucky Derby (officially, the 2018 Kentucky Derby presented by Woodford Reserve) was the 144th running of the Kentucky Derby, and took place on Saturday, May 5, 2018, in Louisville, Kentucky. The field was open to 20 horses, with a purse of US$2 million. The Derby is held annually in Louisville on the first Saturday in May, at the end of the two-week-long Kentucky Derby Festival. It is a Grade I stakes race for three-year-old Thoroughbreds at a distance of 1 1/4 miles (2.0 km), and has been run at Churchill Downs racetrack since its inception in 1875.

The race was broadcast by NBC, with coverage by NBCSN of undercard races beginning at 12:30pm EDT and main network coverage of pre-race activities starting at 2:30pm EDT. Post time was 6:52pm EDT. The race was won by Justify, who was the post-time favorite, in a time of 2:04.20 over a sloppy track. It is the first time since 1882 that the race was won by a horse that did not race at the age of two.

== Qualification ==
The Kentucky Derby is only open to three-year-old Thoroughbreds, thus all entrants in the 2018 race were part of the 2015 North American live foal crop of roughly 22,000. The field was limited to twenty horses who qualified based on points earned in the 2018 Road to the Kentucky Derby, a series of designated races that was first introduced in 2013. This point system replaced the previous graded stakes race earnings system.

The top points earner in the 2018 series was Magnum Moon (150 points), winner of the Rebel Stakes and Arkansas Derby. Good Magic, the champion two-year-old from 2017, finished second in the series by winning both the Breeders' Cup Juvenile and the Blue Grass Stakes. The other major prep winners were Noble Indy (Louisiana Derby), Mendelssohn (UAE Derby), Audible (Florida Derby), Vino Rosso (Wood Memorial) and Justify (Santa Anita Derby).

Churchill Downs also created separate qualification roads for horses based in Japan and Europe. None of the invitations for qualifiers on the Japan Road was accepted. On the European Road, the connections of Gronkowski accepted after the colt qualified first. However, the colt subsequently became ill and had to miss the race.

== Field ==
The early favorite was Justify, who had made only three starts before the race but won each time with triple-digit Beyer Speed Figures. In the Derby, he had to surmount what came to be known as the "Curse of Apollo" – a reference to the fact that no horse had ever won the Derby without racing while at age two since Apollo in 1882. "Justify is a natural and he's still green, just learning how to run. He's so talented", said his trainer Bob Baffert. "But there are a lot of nice horses out there this year."

Trainer Todd Pletcher, who won the 2017 Kentucky Derby with Always Dreaming, had four of the leading contenders: Magnum Moon, Audible, Vino Rosso, and Noble Indy. Magnum Moon was ranked number two on the National Thoroughbred Racing Association top three-year-old poll of April 16 after his win in the Arkansas Derby. He had made only four starts prior to the Kentucky Derby, like Justified not having raced at age two. Audible was ranked number three, while Vino Rosso and Noble Indy were ranked seventh and eighth respectively.

The two colts with the best form at age two, Good Magic and Bolt d'Oro, were ranked fourth and fifth respectively on the same poll. They were the winter-book favorites for the Derby, but both suffered training setbacks that delayed their return to the racetrack. They both had one win from two starts at age three going into the Derby.

Adding an international element to the field was Mendelssohn, trained in Ireland by Aidan O'Brien. Mendelssohn started his racing career on the turf and proved his ability to ship well by winning the Breeders' Cup Juvenile Turf at Del Mar in California in 2017. However, O'Brien felt that the colt would be equally suited to racing on the dirt given his pedigree: Mendelssohn is a half brother to multiple Eclipse Award-winner Beholder. Mendelssohn earned his berth by winning the UAE Derby in an "astonishing" performance while setting a track record.

Entries for the Kentucky Derby were taken on May 1. Justify drew post position 7 and was installed as the 3-1 morning line favorite by oddsmaker Mike Battaglia.

== Race description ==
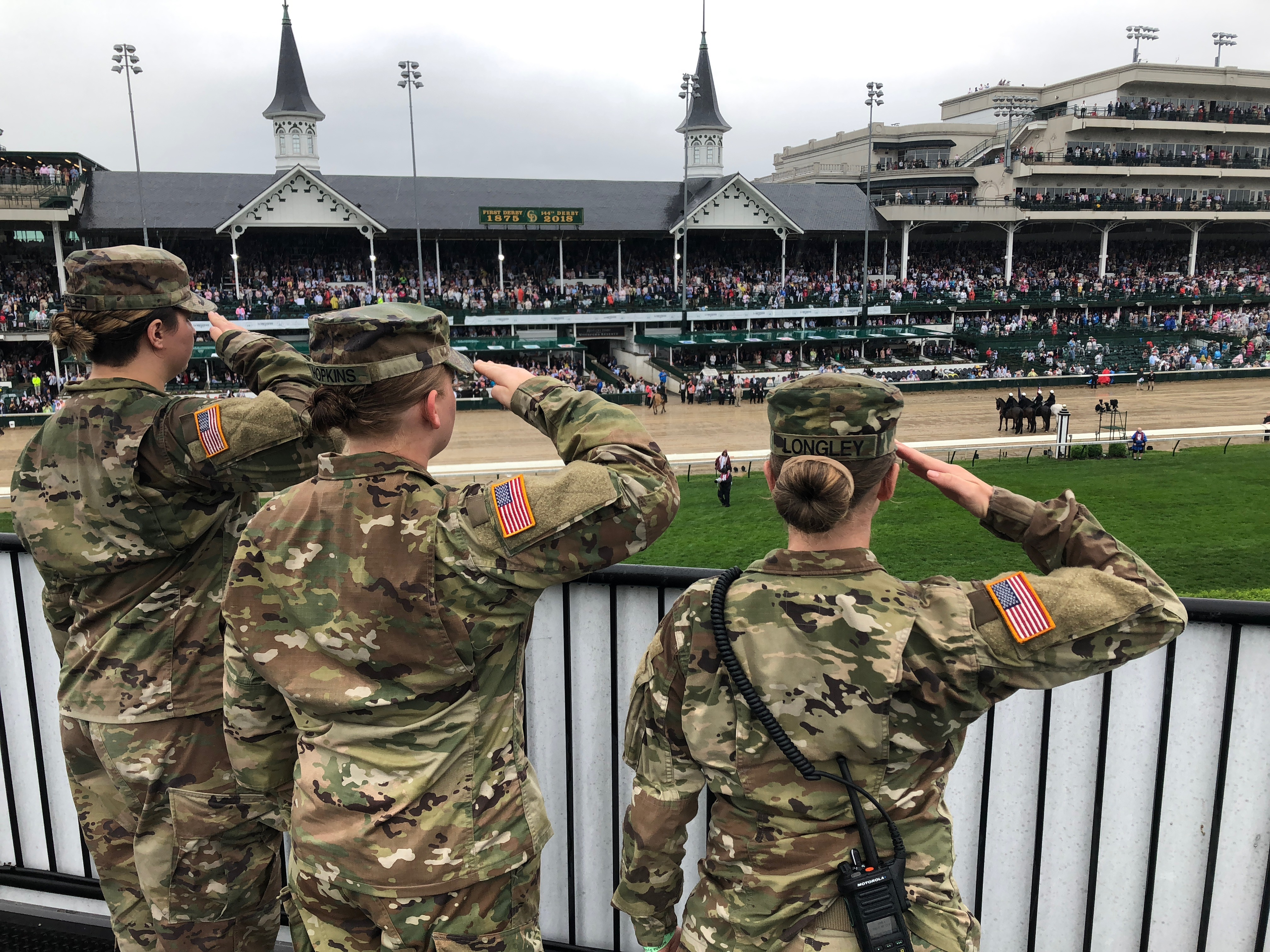
Kentucky National Guard saluting during the playing of the National Anthem

Because the Derby was held on a rainy day, the surface of the track was sealed to mitigate the effect of heavy rain on the footing. Nonetheless, the track condition was sloppy. By post time, more than 2.8 inches (7.1 cm) of rain had been recorded that day at nearby Louisville International Airport, breaking the Derby Day precipitation record of 2.31 inches (5.9 cm) that had been set in 1918. Despite the rain, a crowd of 157,813 attended the event, the eighth largest in Derby history, and the wettest of all time. A record $149.2 million was bet on the Derby itself from all sources, while the full card earned an all-source handle of $225.7 million, up 8% from the previous year's record.

Justify in starting gate for Kentucky Derby

On the track, Justify's jockey Mike Smith used the colt's early speed to gain vantage position near the rail moving into the first turn. He was positioned just a length after Promises Fulfilled and maintained this position down the backstretch. Following them closely were Flameaway, Bolt d'Oro and Good Magic. Although the opening fractions (22.24 for the first quarter, 45.77 for the half, 1:11.01 for the three-quarters) were fast, Smith said Justify felt "very comfortable".

In the final turn, Bolt d'Oro and later Good Magic were both put to a drive, while Promises Fulfilled began to drop back. Justify responded to urging to open up a lead of 1 1/2 lengths as they turned into the stretch, widening to 2 1/2 lengths at the finish line. Bolt d'Oro tired, eventually finishing in twelfth place, but Good Magic persevered to finish second. Audible closed from twelfth place to finish third, just a head behind Good Magic.

It was the fifth Derby win for Baffert and the second for Smith.

Mendelssohn, who went off as the third choice in the betting, broke well from post position 14 but was hit hard shortly after the start by Magnum Moon, who veered over from post position 16. Losing ground and "banged around in traffic", Mendelssohn was eased and finished last. On the other hand, Instilled Regard, who broke from post position 15 and was also involved in the initial bumping incident, rallied from 17th place to finish fourth.

== Results ==
Finish	Program Number	Horse	Jockey	Trainer	Qualifying Points	Morning Line Odds	Final Odds	Margin (Lengths)	Winnings
1	7	Justify	Mike Smith	Bob Baffert	100	3-1	2.90		$1,432,000
2	6	Good Magic	José Ortiz	Chad Brown	134	12-1	9.70	2 1/2	$400,000
3	5	Audible	Javier Castellano	Todd Pletcher	110	8-1	7.00	2 1/2	$200,000
4	15	Instilled Regard	Drayden Van Dyke	Jerry Hollendorfer	29	50-1	85.10	4 1/4	$100,000
5	10	My Boy Jack	Kent Desormeaux	J. Keith Desormeaux	52	20-1	6.70	7	$60,000
6	13	Bravazo	Luis Contreras	D. Wayne Lukas	54	50-1	66.90	8	
7	9	Hofburg	Irad Ortiz Jr.	Bill Mott	40	20-1	27.00	8 3/4	
8	8	Lone Sailor	James Graham	Thomas Amoss	42	50-1	24.50	9 1/4	
9	18	Vino Rosso	John Velazquez	Todd Pletcher	107	12-1	14.10	10 1/2	
10	17	Solomini	Flavien Prat	Bob Baffert	54	30-1	62.90	11	
11	1	Firenze Fire	Paco Lopez	Jason Servis	39	50-1	59.70	23 1/2	
12	11	Bolt d'Oro	Victor Espinoza	Mick Ruis	104	8-1	8.90	24 1/4	
13	4	Flameaway	Jose Lezcano	Mark Casse	70	30-1	37.50	30 1/2	
14	12	Enticed	Junior Alvarado	Kiaran McLaughlin	103	30-1	50.30	34 3/4	
15	3	Promises Fulfilled	Corey Lanerie	Dale Romans	52	30-1	49.00	39 3/4	
16	2	Free Drop Billy	Robby Albarado	Dale Romans	44	30-1	45.40	41	
17	19	Noble Indy	Florent Geroux	Todd Pletcher	110	30-1	59.20	42 1/4	
18	20	Combatant	Ricardo Santana Jr.	Steve Asmussen	32	50-1	70.60	42 3/4	
19	16	Magnum Moon	Luis Saez	Todd Pletcher	150	6-1	13.70	49 1/2	
20	14	Mendelssohn	Ryan Moore	Aidan O'Brien	100	5-1	6.80	73 1/4	
	also eligible	~~Blended Citizen~~ (Note: Blended Citizen was "also eligible", meaning he would have drawn into the field if any of the top 20 had withdrawn before betting began on May 4.)	~~Kyle Frey~~	~~Doug O'Neill~~	22	50-1	SCR		

Track: Sloppy (sealed)

Times: 1/4 mile – 22.24; 1/2 mile – 45.77; 3/4 mile – 1:11.01; mile – 1:37.35; final – 2:04.20.
Splits for each quarter-mile: (22.24) (23.53) (25.24) (26.34) (26.85)

Source: Equibase chart

=== Payout ===
The table below gives Kentucky Derby payout schedule

Program number	Horse name	Win	Place	Show
7	Justify	$7.80	$6.00	$4.40
6	Good Magic	–	$9.20	$6.60
5	Audible	–	–	$5.80

- $2 Exacta: (7–6) $69.60
- $1 Trifecta: (7–6–5) $141.40
- $1 Superfecta: (7–6–5–15) $19,618.20
- $1 Super High Five: (7–6–5–15–10) $183,580.20

== Subsequent Grade I wins ==
Several horses went on from the Derby to post Grade I wins. Most notably, Justify completed the American Triple Crown and was named Horse of the Year.

- Justify – Preakness Stakes, Belmont Stakes
- Good Magic – Haskell Invitational
- Vino Rosso – 2019 Gold Cup at Santa Anita Stakes, Breeders' Cup Classic
- Instilled Regard – 2020 Manhattan Stakes
- Promises Fulfilled – H. Allen Jerkens Stakes
- Combatant – 2020 Santa Anita Handicap
