= Mike E. Smith =

American jockey

Mike Smith
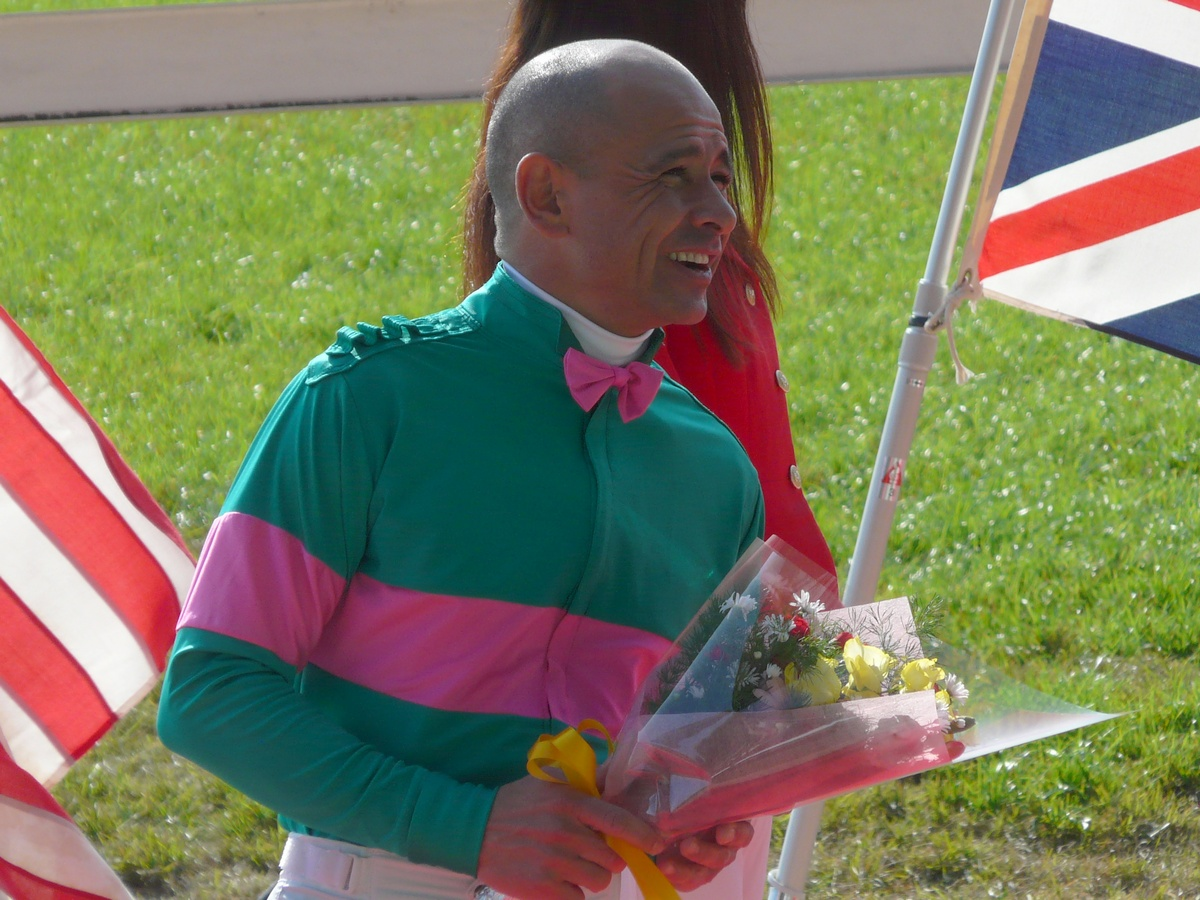
- Smith in 2010

Personal information
- Full name: Michael Earl Smith
- Born: August 10, 1965 (age 61) Dexter, New Mexico, U.S.
- Occupation: Jockey

Horse racing career
- Sport: Horse racing
- Career wins: 5,791 As of October 31, 2025

Major racing wins
- American Classics wins: United States Triple Crown (2018); Kentucky Derby (2005, 2018); Preakness Stakes (1993, 2018); Belmont Stakes (2010, 2013, 2018) Breeders' Cup wins Breeders' Cup Marathon (2013); Breeders' Cup Juvenile Turf (2013); Breeders' Cup Dirt Mile (2016); Breeders' Cup Filly & Mare Sprint (2014, 2016); Breeders' Cup Turf Sprint (2012, 2013); Breeders' Cup Sprint (1994, 2011); Breeders' Cup Mile (1992, 1993); Breeders' Cup Distaff (1995, 1997, 2002, 2008, 2012); Breeders' Cup Juvenile Fillies (2008, 2015, 2017); Breeders' Cup Juvenile (1995, 2002, 2021); Breeders' Cup Turf (1994); Breeders' Cup Classic (1997, 2009, 2011, 2016) Grade I Stakes Wins: Acorn Stakes 1993, 1994, 1996, 1998, 2017; Alabama Stakes 1993, 1994, 1995, 2000, 2016; American Oaks 2012, 2013, 2017; Apple Blossom Invitational Stakes 1994, 2002, 2003, 2004, 2008, 2010, 2019; Arkansas Derby 2008, 2012, 2019; Ashland Stakes 1994, 1997, 2013; Awesome Again Stakes / Goodwood Stakes 2007, 2014; Ballerina Stakes 1991, 1999, 2018; Beholder Mile Stakes / Vanity Stakes 2002, 2003, 2008, 2009, 2010, 2015, 2018; Beldame Invitational Stakes 1991, 2012; Bing Crosby Stakes 2012, 2013; Caesars International Handicap 1994; Californian Stakes 1995; Chandelier / Oak Leaf Stakes 2007, 2008, 2015; Clark Handicap 2015; Clement L. Hirsch Memorial Turf Championship Stakes 2002; Clement L. Hirsch Stakes 2009, 2010, 2018; Coaching Club American Oaks 1993, 1997, 2000, 2016, 2017; Cotillion Stakes 2000, 2013, 2016, 2018; Delaware Handicap 2013, 2017; Del Mar Debutante Stakes 2008, 2015; Del Mar Oaks 2005, 2012; Diana Stakes 2010; Eddie Read Stakes 2014, 2015; E. P. Taylor Stakes 1999; First Lady Stakes 2010; Florida Derby 1994, 1995, 1996; Forego Stakes 2017; Frank E. Kilroe Mile Handicap 2010; Frizette Stakes 1993; Futurity Stakes 1993; Gamely Breeders' Cup Handicap 2004; Gazelle Handicap 1994, 2000; Go For Wand Handicap 1994, 1998; Hollywood Gold Cup Handicap 2004, 2013; Haskell Invitational Handicap 1994, 1998, 2020, 2023; Hollywood Derby 2007; Hopeful Stakes 1991; Joe Hirsch Turf Classic Invitational Stakes 1993, 1997, 2013; Just A Game Stakes 2010; Kentucky Oaks (2013, 2017); King's Bishop Stakes 2016; La Brea Stakes 2004, 2007, 2015, 2017, 2019; Las Virgenes Stakes 2009; Los Alamitos Futurity / Hollywood Futurity 2003, 2016, 2017; Malibu Stakes 2009, 2014, 2018, 2019, 2020; Meadowlands Cup Handicap 1994; Metropolitan Handicap 1994, 2017; Milady Breeders' Cup Handicap 2002, 2003; Mother Goose Stakes 1993, 1997, 1998; Norfolk Stakes 2010; NYRA Mile Handicap 1996; Ogden Phipps Stakes / Hempstead Handicap 1991, 1994, 2017, 2018, 2019; Pacific Classic Stakes 2002, 2009, 2010, 2014; Pegasus World Cup Invitational Stakes 2017; Pennsylvania Derby 2017, 2018, 2022; Personal Ensign Stakes / John A. Morris Handicap 1997, 2013, 2018, 2019; Princess Rooney Handicap 2011; Rodeo Drive Stakes 2019; Ruffian Handicap 1992, 1994, 1995; San Carlos Handicap 2002; San Juan Capistrano Invitational Handicap 1995; Santa Anita Derby 2007, 2018, 2019, 2020, 2022, 2026; Santa Anita Handicap 2013, 2014, 2015; Santa Anita Oaks 2009, 2016, 2018; Santa Anita Sprint Championship Stakes / Ancient Title Stakes 2011, 2013, 2019; Santa Margarita Invitational Handicap 2002, 2004, 2010; Shoemaker Mile Stakes 2009, 2017; Shuvee Handicap 1991, 1994; Spinster Stakes 1995, 2013; Starlet Stakes 2015; Suburban Handicap 1994, 1996; Sword Dancer Invitational Handicap 1996; Test Stakes 1993, 1998; Top Flight Handicap 1994, 1995, 1996; Travers Stakes 1994, 1998, 2016, 2017; Vosburgh Stakes 1993; Whitney Handicap 1993, 2019; Wood Memorial Stakes 1990, 1992; Woodward Stakes 1994; Zenyatta Stakes / Lady's Secret Stakes 2008, 2009, 2010, 2014; International race wins: Irish 2,000 Guineas (1991); Queen's Plate (1997); E. P. Taylor Stakes (1999); Breeders' Stakes (2000); Dubai World Cup (2017)

Racing awards
- ESPY Award for Top U.S. Jockey (1994, 2019); Eclipse Award for Outstanding Jockey (1993, 1994); Mike Venezia Memorial Award (1994); George Woolf Memorial Jockey Award (2000); Big Sport of Turfdom Award (2009/2010); Bill Shoemaker Award (2012, 2013, 2016); Laffit Pincay Jr. Award (2017); Triple Crown (2018)

Honors
- National Museum of Racing and Hall of Fame (2003)

Significant horses
- Awesome Again, Arrogate, Azeri, Bodemeister, Cherokee Run, Coronado's Quest, Drosselmeyer, Fourstars Allstar, Giacomo, Game On Dude, Holy Bull, Justify, Lure, Madeo, Midnight Bisou, Mizdirection, Palace Malice, Prairie Bayou, Royal Delta, Shared Belief, Skip Away, Sky Beauty, Songbird, So Happy Stardom Bound, Thunder Gulch, Tiago, Unbridled's Song, Vindication, West Coast, Zenyatta

Michael Earl Smith (born August 10, 1965) is an American jockey who has been one of the leading riders in U.S. Thoroughbred racing since the early 1990s, was inducted into the National Museum of Racing and Hall of Fame in 2003 and has won the most Breeders' Cup races of any jockey with 27 victories. Smith is also the third leading jockey of all time in earnings with over $356 million. In 2018, Smith rode Justify to the Triple Crown, becoming the oldest jockey to win the title at age 52.

== Background ==
Smith was born to George Smith, a one-time jockey, and Vidoll Vallejos in New Mexico; his mother was 19 years old at the time. Smith's parents divorced when he was eight years old. Smith spent most of his youth on his maternal grandparents' horse farm where he began breaking horses at eight years old.

Smith began riding races in his native New Mexico at age 11, and took out a jockey's license at age 16 in 1982. In the ninth grade, Smith dropped out of Dexter High School. Shortly thereafter, accompanied by his paternal grandfather, he began riding a Midwestern circuit which included races at Hawthorne Race Course in Chicago, Ak-Sar-Ben in Omaha and Oaklawn Park Race Track in Hot Springs, Arkansas.

On April 17, 1987, Smith married Patrice Lively, daughter of jockey John L. Lively, in Hot Springs. The marriage ended in divorce.

Smith served his apprenticeship at Canterbury Downs in Minnesota before moving to New York in 1989. In 2000, he established his home base in Southern California.

On January 13, 2019, Mike married Cynthia Naanouh at a private ceremony at St. Rita's Catholic Church in Sierra Madre, California.

== Career ==
In 1991, Smith became one of the few American jockeys to win a European classic by claiming victory in the Irish 2,000 Guineas aboard Fourstars Allstar (some other American jockeys, notably Steve Cauthen and Cash Asmussen, had won European classics before Smith, but were based in Europe). Also that year he got his big break by becoming the leading jockey in New York for the first of three years from 1991 to 1993, with 330, 297 and 313 wins, respectively. The following year, he rode his first Breeders' Cup winner, Lure, in the Breeders' Cup Mile.

The year after that, 1993, Smith truly arrived as a top jockey, setting a North American record for stakes wins in a year with 62. Among his highlights were a win in the Preakness aboard Prairie Bayou- who was later euthanized after breaking down in the Belmont Stakes while being ridden by Smith – and a successful defense of the Breeders' Cup Mile aboard Lure. That year, he won his first Eclipse Award for Outstanding Jockey, and also won an ESPY Award as top jockey. In 1994, he broke his own record for stakes wins with 68, 20 of them Grade I races. Several of those wins came while riding that year's Eclipse Award for Horse of the Year winner, Holy Bull. He also rode two winners in that year's Breeders' Cup, and again won the Eclipse Award as leading jockey. Smith went on to ride two Breeders' Cup winners in both 1995 and 1997.

In 1994, he was voted the Mike Venezia Memorial Award for "extraordinary sportsmanship and citizenship".

The dangers of Smith's profession became evident in 1998, when he suffered major injuries in two separate spills. A broken shoulder in March took him out of action for two months. Then, in August, while leading the Saratoga meeting, he broke two vertebrae in his back, requiring him to wear a body cast for several months. He returned to riding in races six months after the fall. In 2000, he moved his home base from New York to Southern California. That year he won the George Woolf Memorial Jockey Award that honors a rider whose career and personal conduct exemplify the very best example of participants in the sport of thoroughbred racing. In 2002, he served as the regular rider for his second Horse of the Year, Azeri. He rode Azeri to a win in the Breeders' Cup Distaff, and also rode Vindication to a win in the Breeders' Cup Juvenile.

In 2005, he rode 50–1 longshot Giacomo to victory in the Kentucky Derby. The win, Smith's first in the Derby, was something of a vindication for him. He was aboard Giacomo's sire Holy Bull, the 2–1 favorite in the 1994 Derby, but could finish only 12th after Holy Bull was bumped coming out of the starting gate.

In 2008, he added two more Breeders' Cup victories first in the Breeders' Cup Juvenile Fillies with Stardom Bound, and with the then 4-year-old Zenyatta in the Ladies' Classic. A year later, Smith returned to the Breeders' Cup with Zenyatta, this time to capture the Breeders' Cup Classic. Smith partnered Zenyatta to 16 straight victories of a 19-for-20 career that saw her become the first horse to win two different Breeders' Cup races, and the richest female racehorse with the earnings of $7,304,580.

After capturing the Breeders' Cup Ladies Classic on Royal Delta in 2011, Smith became the all-time leader for most Breeders' Cup wins, with 17. By 2016, his record rose to 25 Breeders' Cup wins.

Smith was inducted into the National Museum of Racing and Hall of Fame in 2003. Smith is one of the jockeys featured in Animal Planet's 2009 reality documentary, Jockeys.

Mike Smith earned the 5,000th victory of his Hall of Fame career when he teamed with 2011 sprint champion Amazombie to capture the $150,000 Potrero Grande Stakes (gr. II) at Santa Anita Park on April 7, 2012.

As he became older, Smith chose to ride fewer but more lucrative races, and his success in doing so, particularly his ability to stay calm in the most high-pressure races, earned him the nickname "Big Money Mike". In 2017, Smith became the 14th winner of the Laffit Pincay Jr. Award given by the Hall of Fame jockey it is named for. Recipients are given the award for having served the sport of horse racing "with integrity, extraordinary dedication, determination, and distinction." "When we started this award back in 2004, Mike Smith was absolutely the sort of person we had in mind as one of our winners," Pincay said. "I only got to ride against him briefly out here, but I've followed his career over the years and he's been a model of consistency, class, and pure athletic ability. He's a star in all senses of the word and it is an honor to honor him."

In 2018, Smith became the rider of Justify, who, after winning two races with the horse in California, won the 2018 Kentucky Derby. In doing so, the horse broke the 136-year-old "curse of Apollo" by winning the Kentucky Derby without having raced at 2 years of age. The last time this feat was accomplished was by Apollo in the 1882 race.

Two weeks later, Justify and Smith won the 2018 Preakness Stakes and then, on June 9, 2018, at the 150th Belmont Stakes, Justify, ridden by Smith, became the 13th Triple Crown winner. In doing so, Smith, at age 52, became the oldest jockey to win a Triple Crown.

On December 28, 2019, Mike Smith surpassed Jerry Bailey for most grade 1 wins by a jockey with 217 wins.

== Year-end charts ==
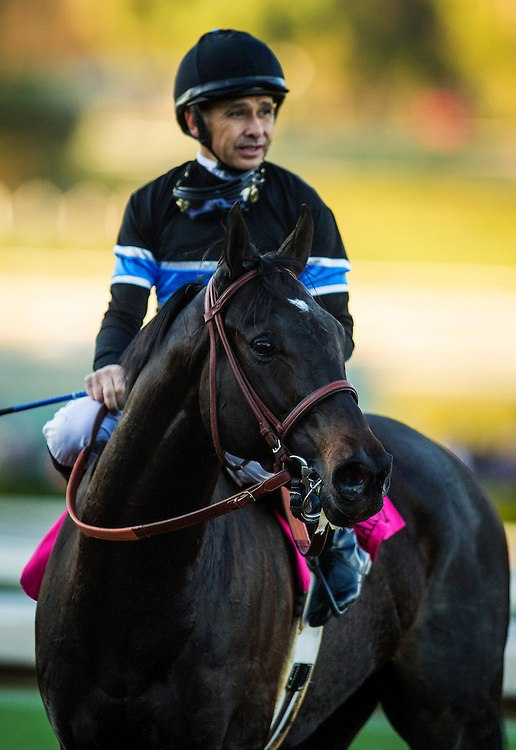
Smith with Shared Belief in 2014

Chart (2000–present)	Rank by earnings
National Earnings List for Jockeys 2000	17
National Earnings List for Jockeys 2001	39
National Earnings List for Jockeys 2002	11
National Earnings List for Jockeys 2003	18
National Earnings List for Jockeys 2004	21
National Earnings List for Jockeys 2005	25
National Earnings List for Jockeys 2006	54
National Earnings List for Jockeys 2007	30
National Earnings List for Jockeys 2008	15
National Earnings List for Jockeys 2009	11
National Earnings List for Jockeys 2010	14
National Earnings List for Jockeys 2011	14
National Earnings List for Jockeys 2012	13
National Earnings List for Jockeys 2013	7
National Earnings List for Jockeys 2014	6
National Earnings List for Jockeys 2015	11
National Earnings List for Jockeys 2016	8
National Earnings List for Jockeys 2017	5
National Earnings List for Jockeys 2018	12
National Earnings List for Jockeys 2019	15
National Earnings List for Jockeys 2020	33
National Earnings List for Jockeys 2021	50
