= Vino Rosso =

American thoroughbred racehorse

- Vino Rosso before the 2018 Kentucky Derby
- Sire: Curlin
- Grandsire: Smart Strike
- Dam: Mythical Bride
- Damsire: Street Cry
- Sex: Stallion
- Foaled: 2015
- Country: USA
- Color: Chestnut
- Breeder: John D. Gunther
- Owner: Repole Stable (Mike Repole) & St. Elias Stable (Vincent Viola)
- Trainer: Todd Pletcher
- Record: 15:6-1-3
- Earnings: $4,803,125

Major wins
- Wood Memorial Stakes (2018); Stymie Stakes (2019); Gold Cup at Santa Anita Stakes (2019); Breeders' Cup wins: Breeders' Cup Classic (2019)

Vino Rosso (foaled March 29, 2015) is an American Thoroughbred racehorse who won the 2019 Breeders' Cup Classic.

== Racing career ==
Vino Rosso made his racing debut on November 11, 2017, with a win at Aqueduct Racetrack. He then won his second race at Tampa Bay Downs on December 22, 2017.

At age three, his 2018 racing season started with a third-place finish in the Grade 3 Sam F. Davis Stakes. He picked up his first Graded stakes race win on April 7, 2018, in the Grade 2 Wood Memorial Stakes. He competed in the 2018 Kentucky Derby, where he finished in 9th place. His season ended abruptly in August.

His 2019 racing season was much more successful than his 2018 season. He started the season off with a win on March 9, 2019, in the Stymie Stakes. He then captured his biggest win up to that point when he won the Gold Cup at Santa Anita Stakes on May 27, 2019.

He came in third place at the Grade 1 Whitney Handicap on August 3, 2019, and ran second in the Grade 1 Jockey Club Gold Cup. He then finished his season on November 2, 2019, with a win at the Grade 1 Breeders' Cup Classic. This was ultimately his final race as he was retired in November 2019.

== Stud career ==
Vino Rosso retired to Spendthrift Farm upon the conclusion of his racing career. As of 2023 he stands for a stud fee of $15,000. His first win as a sire came on May 15, 2023, when his son Laugh Now won at Horseshoe Indianapolis.

=== Notable progeny ===
c = colt, f = filly, g = gelding

Foaled	Name	Sex	Major Wins
2023	Bottle of Rouge	f	Debutante Stakes (2025)
2023	Baby Vino	c	Haskell Stakes (2026)

== Pedigree ==
Pedigree of Vino Rosso (USA), 2015
Sire Curlin (USA) 2004	Smart Strike (CAN); 1992	Mr. Prospector	Raise a Native
Sire Curlin (USA) 2004	Smart Strike (CAN); 1992	Mr. Prospector	Gold Digger
Sire Curlin (USA) 2004	Smart Strike (CAN); 1992	Classy 'n Smart	Smarten
Sire Curlin (USA) 2004	Smart Strike (CAN); 1992	Classy 'n Smart	No Class
Sire Curlin (USA) 2004	Sherrifs Deputy (USA); 1994	Deputy Minister	Vice Regent
Sire Curlin (USA) 2004	Sherrifs Deputy (USA); 1994	Deputy Minister	Mint Copy
Sire Curlin (USA) 2004	Sherrifs Deputy (USA); 1994	Barbarika	Bates Motel
Sire Curlin (USA) 2004	Sherrifs Deputy (USA); 1994	Barbarika	War Exchange
Dam Mythical Bride (USA) 2008	Street Cry (IRE); 1998	Machiavellian	Mr. Prospector
Dam Mythical Bride (USA) 2008	Street Cry (IRE); 1998	Machiavellian	Coup De Folie
Dam Mythical Bride (USA) 2008	Street Cry (IRE); 1998	Helen Street	Troy
Dam Mythical Bride (USA) 2008	Street Cry (IRE); 1998	Helen Street	Waterway
Dam Mythical Bride (USA) 2008	Flaming Heart (USA); 2001	Touch Gold	Deputy Minister
Dam Mythical Bride (USA) 2008	Flaming Heart (USA); 2001	Touch Gold	Passing Mood
Dam Mythical Bride (USA) 2008	Flaming Heart (USA); 2001	Hot Lear	Lear Fan
Dam Mythical Bride (USA) 2008	Flaming Heart (USA); 2001	Hot Lear	Medicine Woman
