= 2007 Preakness Stakes =

132nd running of the Preakness Stakes

132nd Preakness Stakes
- The Preakness Stakes
- "The Middle Jewel of the Triple Crown" "The Run for the Black-Eyed Susans"
- Location: Pimlico Race Course, Baltimore, Maryland, United States
- Date: May 19, 2007
- Winning horse: Curlin
- Winning time: 1:53.46
- Final odds: 3.4-1
- Jockey: Robby Albarado
- Trainer: Steve Asmussen
- Conditions: Fast
- Surface: Dirt
- Attendance: 132,221

The 2007 Preakness Stakes was the 132nd running of the Preakness Stakes thoroughbred horse race. The race took place on May 19, 2007. It was a photo finish between Curlin and Street Sense, which was won by Curlin by a head, the shortest margin of victory in Preakness history. The Maryland Jockey Club reported total attendance of 132,221, this is recorded as second highest on the list of American thoroughbred racing top attended events for North America in 2007. This figure represented a record attendance for The Preakness Stakes.

The winning time over a fast track was 1:53.46, then considered to be tied for the fastest time ever with the clocking of 1:53 2/5 (which can range from 1:53.40-1:53.59) set in 1985 by Tank's Prospect and tied in 1996 by Louis Quatorze. However, the current record for the race is 1:53.00, retroactively credited to Secretariat in 2012 after a timer malfunction in the 1973 Preakness Stakes.

== Payout ==
The 132nd Preakness Stakes Payout Schedule

| Program Number | Horse Name | Win | Place | Show |
|---|---|---|---|---|
| 4 | Curlin | $8.80 | $3.80 | $2.80 |
| 8 | Street Sense | - | $3.00 | $2.40 |
| 7 | Hard Spun | - | - | $3.00 |

- $2 Exacta: (4-8) paid $23.20
- $1 Trifecta: (4-8-7) paid $50.00
- $1 Superfecta: (4-8-7-9) paid $340.30

== The full chart ==
| Finish Position | Margin (lengths) | Post Position | Horse name | Jockey | Trainer | Owner | Post Time Odds | Purse Earnings |
|---|---|---|---|---|---|---|---|---|
| 1st | 0 | 4 | Curlin | Robby Albarado | Steve Asmussen | Stonestreet Stables | 3.40-1 | $600,000 |
| 2nd | Head | 8 | Street Sense | Calvin Borel | Carl Nafzger | James Tafel | 1.30-1 favorite | $200,000 |
| 3rd | 4 | 7 | Hard Spun | Mario G. Pino | J. Larry Jones | Fox Hill Farms | 4.10-1 | $110,000 |
| 4th | 5 1/2 | 9 | C P West | Edgar Prado | Nick Zito | Robert V. LaPenta | 24.90-1 | $60,000 |
| 5th | 6 3/4 | 3 | Circular Quay | John R. Velazquez | Todd Pletcher | Michael Tabor | 6.00-1 | $30,000 |
| 6th | 10 1/2 | 5 | King of the Roxy | Garrett Gomez | Todd Pletcher | Team Valor | 14.20-1 | |
| 7th | 17 | 1 | Mint Slewlep | Alan Garcia | Larry Jones | Marshall E. Dowell | 40.10-1 | |
| 8th | 25 1/2 | 2 | Xchanger | Ramon Dominguez | Carl Nafzger | Circle Z Stables | 23.00-1 | |
| 9th | 29 3/4 | 6 | Flying First Class | Mark Guidry | D. Wayne Lukas | Ellwood W. Johnston | 16.60-1 | |

- Winning Breeder: Faris Farm Inc.; (KY)
- Final Time: 1:53.46
- Track Condition: Fast
- Total Attendance: 132,221 * (Preakness Record)

== Preakness Stakes feature key prep races list ==
This list contains the current 2007 standings that leads to the Preakness Stakes race.

| Date | Track | Race | Gr. | Dist. | Purse (US$) | Track Surf. | Winning horse | Win jockey |
|---|---|---|---|---|---|---|---|---|
| January 13 | Fair Grounds Race Course | LeComte Stakes | 3 | 1 Mile | $98,000 | Dirt | Hard Spun | M. Pino |
| February 3 | Laurel Park | Miracle Wood Stakes | | 1 Mile | $50,900 | Dirt | Crafty Bear | M. Pino |
| March 3 | Gulfstream Park | Fountain of Youth Stakes | 2 | 1 1/8 Miles | $350,000 | Dirt | Scat Daddy | John Velázquez |
| March 3 | Gulfstream Park | Hutcheson Stakes | 2 | 7 1/2 Furlongs | $150,000 | Dirt | King of the Roxy | Edgar Prado |
| March 3 | Santa Anita Park | Robert B. Lewis Stakes | 2 | 1-1/16 Miles | $200,000 | Dirt | Great Hunter | Corey Nakatani |
| March 10 | Aqueduct Racetrack | The Gotham Stakes | 3 | 1-1/16 Miles | $200,000 | Dirt | Cowtown Cat | R. Dominguez |
| March 10 | Fair Grounds Race Course | Louisiana Derby | 2 | 1-1/16 Miles | $594,000 | Dirt | Circular Quay | John Velázquez |
| March 17 | Oaklawn Park | The Rebel Stakes | 3 | 1-1/16 Miles | $300,000 | Dirt | Curlin | Robby Albarado |
| March 17 | Tampa Bay Downs | Tampa Bay Derby | 3 | 1-1/16 Miles | $300,000 | Dirt | Street Sense | C. Borel |
| March 24 | Turfway Park | Lane's End Spiral Stakes | 2 | 1 1/8 Miles | $500,000 | Dirt | Hard Spun | M. Pino |
| March 24 | Laurel Park | Private Terms Stakes | | 1 Mile | $100,000 | Dirt | Etude | Luis Garcia |
| March 31 | Gulfstream Park | Florida Derby | 1 | 1 1/8 Miles | $1,000,000 | Dirt | Scat Daddy | Edgar Prado |
| April 7 | Aqueduct Racetrack | Wood Memorial Stakes | 1 | 1 1/8 Miles | $750,000 | Dirt | Nobiz Like Shobiz | Cornelio Velázquez |
| April 7 | Santa Anita Park | Santa Anita Derby | 1 | 1 1/8 Miles | $750,000 | Dirt | Tiago | Mike Smith |
| April 7 | Hawthorne Race Course | Illinois Derby | 2 | 1 1/8 Miles | $500,000 | Dirt | Cowtown Cat | Fernando Jara |
| April 14 | Keeneland Race Course | Blue Grass Stakes | 1 | 1 1/8 Miles | $750,000 | Dirt | Dominican | Rafael Bejarano |
| April 14 | Oaklawn Park | Arkansas Derby | 2 | 1 1/8 Miles | $1,000,000 | Dirt | Curlin | Robby Albarado |
| April 21 | Pimlico Race Course | Federico Tesio Stakes | | 1 1/8 Miles | $125,000 | Dirt | Xchanger | Ramon A. Dominguez |
| April 28 | Churchill Downs | Derby Trial Stakes | | 7 1/2 Furlongs | $100,000 | Dirt | Flying First Class | Mark Guidry |
| May 5 | Churchill Downs | Kentucky Derby | 1 | 1 1/4 Miles | $11.80 | Dirt | Street Sense | Calvin Borel |

== See also ==
- 2007 Kentucky Derby
- 2007 Belmont Stakes
