= 2007 Kentucky Derby =

Horse race

133rd Kentucky Derby Presented by Yum! Brands
- Kentucky Derby
- Location: Churchill Downs
- Date: May 5, 2007
- Winning horse: Street Sense
- Winning time: 2:02.17
- Starting price: 5-1
- Jockey: Calvin Borel
- Trainer: Carl Nafzger
- Owner: James B. Tafel
- Conditions: Fast
- Surface: Dirt
- Attendance: 156,635

The 2007 Kentucky Derby was the 133rd running of the Kentucky Derby. The race took place on May 5, 2007. The announced attendance was 156,635, the third largest in Derby history.

Elizabeth II, Queen of the United Kingdom, was a special guest of Churchill Downs and attended the race in her first visit to the United States since 1991. The Queen has stated that it was one of her dreams to attend the Kentucky Derby.

Street Sense, sent off as the 9-2 favorite on his home track, paid $11.80 as the highest-priced winning favorite in Derby history. Smarty Jones paid $10.20 to win in 2004.

== Payout ==
The 134th Kentucky Derby Payout Schedule

Program Number	Horse Name	Win	Place	Show
7	Street Sense	US$11.80	$6.40	$4.60
8	Hard Spun	-	$9.80	$7.00
2	Curlin	-	-	$5.60

- $2 Exacta: (7–8) Paid $101.80
- $2 Trifecta: (7–8–2) Paid $440.00
- $2 Superfecta (7–8–2–5) Paid $29,046.40

== Full results ==
Finished	Post	Horse	Jockey	Trainer	Owner	Time / behind	Odds
1st	7	Street Sense	Calvin Borel	Carl Nafzger	James B. Tafel	2:02.17	4.90
2nd	8	Hard Spun	Mario Pino	Larry Jones	Rick Porter	2 1/4 lengths	10.00
3rd	2	Curlin	Robby Albarado	Steve Asmussen	Jackson, Padua, Bolton and Midnight Cry Stable	5 3/4 lengths	5.00
4th	5	Imawildandcrazyguy	Mark Guidry	William Kaplan	Pell and Eigner		28.90
5th	1	Sedgefield	Julien Leparoux	Darrin Miller	Silverton Hill Farm LLC		58.60
6th	16	Circular Quay	John Velazquez	Todd Pletcher	Michael B. & Doreen Tabor		11.40
7th	15	Tiago	Mike E. Smith	John Shirreffs	Jerry & Ann Moss		14.80
8th	18	Any Given Saturday	Garrett K. Gomez	Todd Pletcher	WinStar Farm & Padua Stables		13.60
9th	13	Sam P.	Ramon Domínguez	Todd Pletcher	Donald Lucarelli & Starlight Stable (Jack Wolf)		43.70
10th	12	Nobiz Like Shobiz	Cornelio Velásquez	Barclay Tagg	Elizabeth J. Valando		10.40
11th	19	Dominican	Rafael Bejarano	Darrin Miller	Silverton Hill Farm LLC		24.90
12th	3	Zanjero	Shaun Bridgmohan	Steve Asmussen	Winchell Thoroughbreds, LLC (Ron Winchell & Christina Harris)		36.00
13th	20	Great Hunter	Corey Nakatani	Doug O'Neill	J. Paul Reddam		25.30
14th	9	Liquidity	David Flores	Doug O'Neill	J. Paul Reddam		40.00
15th	11	Bwana Bull	Javier Castellano	Jerry Hollendorfer	Dan & George Todaro, Mark DeMomencico, Mark Jelladian		50.30
16th	4	Storm in May	Juan Leyva	William A. Kaplan	Felicity Waugh, William Kaplan, Teresa & David Palmer		27.20
17th	10	Teuflesberg	Stewart Elliott	Jamie Sanders	Gary S. Logsdon, Donnie Kelly, Jamie Sanders		51.90
18th	14	Scat Daddy	Edgar Prado	Todd Pletcher	James T. Scatuorchio, Michael Tabor, Derrick Smith		7.20
19th	17	Stormello	Kent Desormeaux	William L. Currin	William L. Currin & Al Eisman		44.80
20th	6	Cowtown Cat	Fernando Jara	Todd Pletcher	Winstar Farm		19.80

== Kentucky Derby feature key prep races list ==
This list contains the current 2007 standings that leads to the Kentucky Derby race.

Date	Track	Race	Grade	Distance	Purse (US$)	Surface track	Winning horse	Winning jockey
January 1	Calder Race Course	Tropical Park Derby	3	1 1/8 Miles	$100,000	Turf	Soldier's Dancer	C. Velázquez
January 6	Aqueduct Racetrack	Count Fleet Stakes		1 Mile and 70 Yards	$70,865	Inner Track (Dirt)	Pink Viper	N. Arroyo Jr.
January 7	Gulfstream Park	Spectacular Bid Stakes		6 Furlongs	$80,000	Dirt	Buffalo Man	E. Castro
January 7	Santa Anita Park	San Miguel Stakes		6 Furlongs	$80,000	Dirt	E. Z. Warrior	D. Flores
January 13	Santa Anita Park	San Rafael Stakes	2	1 Mile	$150,000	Dirt	Notional	C. Nakatani
January 13	Fair Grounds Race Course	LeComte Stakes	3	1 Mile	$98,000	Dirt	Hard Spun	M. Pino
January 15	Aqueduct Racetrack	Jimmy Winkfield Stakes		6 Furlongs	$62,082	Inner Track (Dirt)	Bill Place	R. Dominguez
January 27	Gulfstream Park	Sunshine Million Dash Stakes		6 Furlongs	$250,000	Dirt	Storm in May	M. Cruz
January 27	Tampa Bay Downs	Pasco Stakes		7 Furlongs	$75,000	Dirt	Barkley Sound	E. Jurado
January 28	Golden Gate Fields	California Derby		1 1/16 Miles	$150,000	Dirt	Bwana Bull	D. Lopez
February 3	Gulfstream Park	Holy Bull Stakes	3	1 Mile	$150,000	Dirt	Nobiz Like Shobiz	C. Velázquez
February 3	Gulfstream Park	Swale Stakes	2	6 1/2 Furlongs	$150,000	Dirt	Adore the Gold	C. Velázquez
February 3	Santa Anita Park	Sham Stakes	3	1 1/8 Miles	$101,500	Dirt	Ravel	G. Gomez
February 3	Laurel Park	Miracle Wood Stakes		1 Mile	$50,900	Dirt	Crafty Bear	M. Pino
February 10	Fair Grounds Race Course	Risen Star Stakes	3	1 1/16 Miles	$300,000	Dirt	Notional	R. Albarado
February 10	Aqueduct Racetrack	Whirlaway Stakes		1 1/16 Miles	$70,070	Inner Track (Dirt)	Summer Doldrums	M. Luzzi
February 10	Turfway Park	WEBN Stakes		1 Mile	$50,000	Dirt	Joe Got Even	M. Mena
February 11	Santa Anita Park	San Vicente Stakes	2	7 Furlongs	$150,000	Dirt	Noble Court	C. Nakatani
February 17	Tampa Bay Downs	Sam F. Davis Stakes		1 1/16 Miles	$150,000	Dirt	Any Given Saturday	J. Velázquez
February 17	Turf Paradise	Turf Paradise Derby		1 1/16 Miles	$100,000	Dirt	Tie Rod	J. Rivera
February 19	Oaklawn Park	Southwest Stakes		1 Mile	$250,000	Dirt	Teuflesberg	S. Elliott
February 19	Aqueduct Racetrack	Fred Caposella Stakes		6 Furlongs	$65,000	Dirt	Wollaston Bay	Shawn Bridgmohan
February 24	Gulfstream Park	Hallandale Beach Stakes		1 1/16 Miles	$100,000	Turf	Twilight Meteor	Edgar Prado
February 24	Oaklawn Park	Mountain Valley Stakes		6 Furlongs	$50,000	Dirt	Sir Five Star	J. Shepherd
March 3	Gulfstream Park	Fountain of Youth Stakes	2	1 1/8 Miles	$350,000	Dirt	Scat Daddy	John Velázquez
March 3	Gulfstream Park	Hutchesson Stakes	2	7 1/2 Furlongs	$150,000	Dirt	King of the Roxy	Edgar Prado
March 3	Santa Anita Park	Robert B. Lewis Stakes	2	1 1/16 Miles	$200,000	Dirt	Great Hunter	Corey Nakatani
March 3	Turfway Park	John Battaglia Memorial Stakes		1 1/16 Miles	$200,000	Dirt	Catman Running	W. Martinez
March 10	Aqueduct Racetrack	The Gotham Stakes	3	1 1/16 Miles	$200,000	Dirt	Cowtown Cat	R. Dominguez
March 10	Fair Grounds Race Course	Louisiana Derby	2	1 1/16 Miles	$594,000	Dirt	Circular Quay	John Velázquez
March 10	Bay Meadows	El Camino Real Stakes	3	1 1/16 Miles	$200,000	Dirt	Bwana Bull	Russell Baze
March 16	Santa Anita Park	Pasadena Stakes		1 Mile	$75,000	Turf	Whatsthescript (IRE)	I. Enriquez
March 17	Oaklawn Park	The Rebel Stakes	3	1 1/16 Miles	$300,000	Dirt	Curlin	Robby Albarado
March 17	Santa Anita Derby	San Felipe Stakes	2	1 1/16 Miles	$250,000	Dirt	Cobalt Blue	Victor Espinoza
March 17	Tampa Bay Downs	Tampa Bay Derby	3	1 1/16 Miles	$300,000	Dirt	Street Sense	C. Borel
March 18	Sunland Park	Winstar Derby		1 1/8 Miles	$600,000	Dirt	Song of Navarone	Victor Espinoza
March 24	Turfway Park	Lane's End Stakes	2	1 1/8 Miles	$500,000	Dirt	Hard Spun	M. Pino
March 24	Turfway Park	Rushaway Stakes		1 1/16 Miles	$100,000	Dirt	Dominican	Rafeal Bejarano
March 24	Laurel Park	Private Terms Stakes		1 Mile	$100,000	Dirt	Etude	Luis Garcia
March 24	Gulfstream Park	Palm Beach Stakes	3	1 1/8 Miles	$150,000	Turf	Duveen	Mark Guidry
March 31	Gulfstream Park	Florida Derby	1	1 1/8 Miles	$1,000,000	Dirt	Scat Daddy	Edgar Prado
March 31	Gulfstream Park	Aventura Stakes		7 Furlongs	$175,000	Dirt	Street Magician	Rafael Bejarano
April 7	Aqueduct Racetrack	Wood Memorial Stakes	1	1 1/8 Miles	$750,000	Dirt	Nobiz Like Shobiz	Cornelio Velázquez
April 7	Aqueduct Racetrack	Bay Shore Stakes	3	7 Furlongs	$150,000	Dirt	Bill Place	Cornelio Velázquez
April 7	Santa Anita Park	Santa Anita Derby	1	1 1/8 Miles	$750,000	Dirt	Tiago	Mike Smith
April 7	Hawthorne Race Course	Illinois Derby	2	1 1/8 Miles	$500,000	Dirt	Cowtown Cat	Fernando Jara
April 14	Keeneland Race Course	Blue Grass Stakes	1	1 1/8 Miles	$750,000	Dirt	Dominican	Rafeal Bejarano
April 14	Oaklawn Park	Northern Spur Breeders' Cup Stakes		1 Mile	$100,000	Dirt	Takedown	Robby Albarado
April 14	Oaklawn Park	Arkansas Derby	2	1 1/8 Miles	$1,000,000	Dirt	Curlin	Robby Albarado
April 14	Santa Anita Park	La Puente Stakes		1 Mile	$100,000	Turf	Golden Balls	Brice Blanc
April 21	Keeneland Race Course	Lexington Stakes	2	1 1/16 Miles	$325,000	Dirt	Slew's Tizzy	Robby Albarado
April 21	Pimlico Race Course	Federico Tesio Stakes		1 1/8 Miles	$125,000	Dirt	Xchanger	Ramon A. Dominguez
April 28	Churchill Downs	Derby Trial Stakes		7 1/2 Furlongs	$100,000	Dirt	Flying First Class	Mark Guidry
April 28	Aqueduct Racetrack	Withers Stakes	3	1 Mile	$150,000	Dirt	Divine Park	Alan Garcia

== Subsequent Grade I wins ==
The foals of 2004 who raced in the 2007 Derby established themselves as a "vintage crop", both on the track and subsequently as sires. Participants in the 2008 Derby who went on to subsequent Grade I wins are as follows.

- Curlin – Horse of the Year in 2007 and 2008. 2007 Preakness Stakes, Breeders' Cup Classic, Jockey Club Gold Cup. 2008 Dubai World Cup, Stephen Foster Handicap, Woodward Stakes, Jockey Club Gold Cup
- Hard Spun – King's Bishop Stakes
- Street Sense – Travers' Stakes
- Tiago – Goodwood Stakes
- Any Given Saturday – Haskell Invitational

== Subsequent breeding careers ==
Leading progeny of participants in the 2008 Kentucky Derby

=== Sires of Classic winners ===
Scat Daddy (18th)

- Justify – 2018 Horse of the Year. Kentucky Derby, Preakness Stakes, Belmont Stakes, Santa Anita Derby
- Lady Aurelia – 2016 Prix Morny, 2017 King's Stand Stakes
- Caravaggio – 2016 Phoenix Stakes, 2017 Commonwealth Cup
- Mendelssohn – 2017 Breeders' Cup Juvenile Turf
- Il Campione (Chi) – Chilean Horse of the Year. 2014 Premio Polla de Potrillos, Premio Nacional Ricardo Lyon, Premio El Ensayo Mega, 2015 El Derby

Curlin (3rd)

- Exaggerator – 2016 Preakness Stakes, Haskell Invitational, Santa Anita Derby. 2nd Kentucky Derby
- Palace Malice – 2013 Belmont Stakes, 2014 Metropolitan Handicap
- Good Magic – Champion 2yo colt of 2017. Breeders' Cup Juvenile. 2018 Haskell Invitational. 2nd Kentucky Derby
- Vino Rosso – 2019 Breeders' Cup Classic, Gold Cup at Santa Anita
- Stellar Wind – Champion 3yo filly of 2015. Santa Anita Oaks, 2nd in Breeders' Cup Distaff, 2016 Clement L. Hirsch and Zenyatta Stakes, 2017 Apple Blossom, Beholder Mile and Clement L. Hirsch

Hard Spun (2nd)

- Le Romain – Randwick Guineas, Cantala Stakes, BMW Stakes
- Spun to Run – Breeders' Cup Dirt Mile
- Hard Not to Like – Jenny Wiley, Gamely, Diana Stakes
- Hard Aces – Gold Cup at Santa Anita
- Questing – Coaching Club American Oaks, Alabama Stakes

Street Sense (1st)

- Hallowed Crown – 2015 Randwick Guineas, 2014 Golden Rose
- McKinzie – CashCall Futurity, Pennsylvania Derby, Malibu Stakes, Whitney Stakes. 2nd 2019 Breeders' Cup Classic
- Wedding Toast – Ogden Phipps, Beldame Stakes
- Sense of Occasion – Doomben Cup
- Sweet Reason – Spinaway, Acorn, Test Stakes

=== Sires of Grade/Group one winners ===
Any Given Saturday (8th)

- Hoppertunity – Jockey Club Gold Cup

Sources: American Classic Pedigrees, Equibase, Blood-Horse Stallion Register, Racing Post
