= Notional =

American-bred Thoroughbred racehorse

- Sire: In Excess
- Grandsire: Siberian Express
- Dam: Truly Blessed
- Damsire: French Deputy
- Sex: Stallion
- Foaled: 2004
- Country: United States
- Colour: Bay
- Breeder: Vessels Stallion Farm
- Owner: J. Paul Reddam
- Trainer: Doug O'Neill
- Record: 5: 3-0-1 (ongoing)
- Earnings: $313,200 (ongoing)

Major wins
- San Rafael Stakes (2007); Risen Star Stakes (2007); Salvator Mile Handicap (2008)

See Notional amount or Notional profit for economic terms

Notional (born February 1, 2004, in California) is a retired American Thoroughbred racehorse. He was sired by In Excess and out of the mare Truly Blessed. His damsire, French Deputy, is a son of the 1997/98 Leading sire in North America, Deputy Minister.

Notional was trained by Doug O'Neill for owner J. Paul Reddam, who also have three-year-olds Great Hunter and Liquidity in their stable. Racing at age two, Notional's best showing in a stakes race was a third in the 2006 Hollywood Prevue Stakes.

In his three-year-old debut, Notional won January's Grade II San Rafael Stakes at Santa Anita Park in Arcadia, California, by four lengths under jockey Corey Nakatani. Sent to the Fair Grounds Race Course in New Orleans, Louisiana, in February, Notional scored a 2 1/4 length win in the Risen Star Stakes under jockey Robby Albarado in a race where favorite Circular Quay was seriously impeded as a result of a race accident.

Notional came in a close second to Scat Daddy in the Florida Derby in his last prep before the Kentucky Derby. While he was set to run the Triple Crown races, Notional suffered a fracture of his front cannon bone during a workout at Keeneland three weeks before the running of the Kentucky Derby. He underwent surgery for the injury which is not life-threatening, but there is question about whether he will be able to return to racing. He did not run in any of the Triple Crown races.

Having an uneventful four-year-old season, Notional returned to form winning the July 5th, 2008 running of the Salvator Mile Handicap under Joe Bravo.

In 2017, he was standing at stud in Indiana.
