= Patton Stakes =

Flat horse race in Ireland

- Location: Dundalk Stadium; County Louth, Ireland
- Race type: Flat / Thoroughbred
- Website: Dundalk

Race information
- Distance: 1m (1,609 m)
- Surface: Polytrack
- Track: Left-handed
- Qualification: Three-years-old
- Weight: 9 st 5 lb (3yo); Allowances; 5 lb for fillies Penalties; 5 lb for Group 1 or 2 winners 3 lb for Group 3 winners
- Purse: €40,000 (2023); 1st: €23,600

Patton Stakes
2023
Cairo	News At Ten	Stormy Entry

Previous years
2022
Juncture	Morning Soldier	Sister Bridget
2021
My Generation	Rocky Sky	Messidor

2020-2011
2020
Crossfirehurricane	Choice Of Mine	Orchid Gardens
2019
Playa Del Puente	Western Australia	Numerian
2018
Mendelssohn	Threeandfourpence	Seahenge
2017
War Secretary	Noivado	Ambassadorial
2016
Washington Dc	Alphonsus	Most Beautiful
2015
Convergence	War Envoy	Wychwood Warrior
2014
Prince Of All	Magnolia Beach	Due Diligence
2013
Gale Force Ten	Dont Bother Me	Liberating
2012
Requisition	Coolnagree	Nephrite
2011
Sing Softly	Defining Year	Deire Na Sli

2010-2001
2010
Keredari	Jamaayel	Song Of My Heart
2009
Vocalised	Ohiyesa	What's Up Pussycat
2008
Georgebernardshaw	Croi Mo Ri	Capt Chaos
2007
Honoured Guest	Alexander Tango	Howya Now Kid
2006
Decado	Queen Cleopatra	Danehill Music
2005
Indesatchel	Merger	Violets Empire
2004
Newton	Dabiroun	Amarula Ridge
2003
Tomahawk	Abunawwas	Chappel Cresent
2002
Barring Order	Century City	Martin Gunne
2001
Lethal Agenda	Black Minnaloushe	Princess Nutley

2000-1997
2000
Monashee Mountain	Jammaal	Cois Cuain
1999
Tarfaa	Stravinsky	River Canyon
1998
Two-Twenty-Two	Canzona	Brief Sentiment
1997
Mr Lightfoot	Mosconi	Beautiful Fire

The Patton Stakes is a conditions flat horse race in Ireland open to thoroughbreds aged three years old. It is run at Dundalk over a distance of 1 mile (1,609 metres), and it is scheduled to take place each year in late February or early March.

The race was first run in 2013, replacing in the calendar an equivalent race at The Curragh known as the Loughbrown Stakes. Until 2017 the Patton Stakes was run in April over a distance of 7 furlongs. In 2018 it was moved to a March date and increased to 1 mile to become part of the European series of the Road to the Kentucky Derby. The race lost its Listed status from the 2024 running.

== Records ==
Leading jockey (2 wins):

- Colin Keane. – Convergence (2015), Juncture (2022)
- Seamie Heffernan – Washington DC (2016), War Secretary (2017)
- Shane Crosse - Crossfirehurricane (2020), My Generation (2021)
- Ryan Moore - Mendelssohn (2018), Cairo (2023)
- Ronan Whelan - Playa del Puente (2019), Bergamasco (2024)

Leading trainer (5 wins):

- Aidan O'Brien – Gale Force Ten (2013), Washington DC (2016), War Secretary (2017), Mendelssohn (2018), Cairo (2023)

== Winners ==
Year	Winner	Jockey	Trainer	Time
2013	Gale Force Ten	Joseph O'Brien	Aidan O'Brien	1:23.89
2014	Prince Of All	Chris Hayes	Paul Deegan	1:23.94
2015	Convergence	Colin Keane	Ger Lyons	1:24.14
2016	Washington DC	Seamie Heffernan	Aidan O'Brien	1:24.47
2017	War Secretary	Seamie Heffernan	Aidan O'Brien	1:24.76
2018	Mendelssohn	Ryan Moore	Aidan O'Brien	1:38.80
2019	Playa del Puente	Ronan Whelan	Michael Halford	1:37.37
2020	Crossfirehurricane	Shane Crosse	Joseph O'Brien	1:40.10
2021	My Generation	Shane Crosse	Joseph O'Brien	1:38.46
2022	Juncture	Colin Keane	Ger Lyons	1:38.56
2023	Cairo	Ryan Moore	Aidan O'Brien	1:40.48
2024	Bergamasco	Ronan Whelan	Jack Davison	1:39.83
2025	Titanium Emperor	David Egan	Adrian Murray	1:38.23
2026	Blanc De Blanc	Donagh O'Connor	Robson De Aguiar	1:37.91

== Loughbrown Stakes winners ==
Year	Winner	Jockey	Trainer	Time
1997	Mr Lightfoot	Pat Shanahan	Con Collins	1:25.60
1998	Two-Twenty-Two	Michael Kinane	Dermot Weld	1:39.10
1999	Tarfaa	Stephen Craine	Kevin Prendergast	1:38.00
2000	Monashee Mountain	Michael Kinane	Aidan O'Brien	1:34.60
2001	Lethal Agenda	Pat Smullen	Dermot Weld	1:42.50
2002	Barring Order	Johnny Murtagh	John Oxx	1:37.90
2003	Tomahawk	Michael Kinane	Aidan O'Brien	1:31.20
2004	Newton	Jamie Spencer	Aidan O'Brien	1:31.00
2005	Indesatchel	Jamie Spencer	David Wachman	1:32.70
2006	Decado	Declan McDonogh	Kevin Prendergast	1:36.30
2007	Honoured Guest	Seamie Heffernan	Aidan O'Brien	1:23.60
2008	Georgebernardshaw	Johnny Murtagh	Aidan O'Brien	1:38.89
2009	Vocalised	Kevin Manning	Jim Bolger	1:30.76
2010	Keredari (Note: The 2010 winner Keredari was later exported to Hong Kong and renamed Majestic Falcon)	Fran Berry	John Oxx	1:33.60
2011	Sing Softly	Colm O'Donoghue	Aidan O'Brien	1:33.71
2012	Requisition (Note: The 2012 winner Requisition was later exported to Hong Kong and renamed Wealthy Fortune)	Seamie Heffernan	Aidan O'Brien	1:31.04

== See also ==
- Horse racing in Ireland
- List of Irish flat horse races
