= Sugar Bowl Stakes =

- Class: Overnight stakes
- Location: Fair Grounds Race Course; New Orleans, Louisiana
- Inaugurated: 1950
- Race type: Thoroughbred – flat racing
- Website: www.fairgroundsracecourse.com

Race information
- Distance: 6 furlongs
- Surface: Dirt
- Track: Left-handed
- Qualification: Two years old
- Purse: $50,000

The Sugar Bowl Stakes is an American race for Thoroughbred horses run near Christmas at the Fair Grounds Race Course in New Orleans, Louisiana. Set at a distance of six furlongs on the dirt for two-year-olds, the Sugar Bowl currently offers a purse of $100,000.

Although it is an ungraded event, it is still considered a prep to the Kentucky Derby, albeit a minor one.

== Past winners ==
- 2017 - Land Battle (Jose Valdivia Jr.)
- 2016 - Proforma (Florent Geroux)
- 2015 - Taylors Angiel (Roberto Morales)
- 2014 - Cinco Charlie (Robby Albarado)
- 2013 - Alabano
- 2012 - Tour Guide
- 2011 - Exfactor
- 2010 - Archarcharch
- 2009 - Cool Bullet
- 2008 - Ask Joe (Miguel Mena)
- 2007 - Sok Sok (Shaun Bridgmohan)
- 2006 - Teuflesberg (Robby Albarado) (run on Christmas Eve)
- 2005 - Catonight
- 2004 - Storm Surge
- 2003 - Wildcat Shoes
- 2002 - Saintly Look
- 2001 - Mapp Hill
- 2000 - Wild Hits
- 1999 - Littlexpectations
- 1998 - Show Me The Stage (Filly)
- 1997 - Hailley's Prince
- 1996 - Gold Case
- 1995 - Valid Expectations
- 1994 - Timeless Honor
- 1993 - NO RACE
- 1992 - Tonkas Mean Streak
- 1991 - Ecstatic Ride
- 1990 - Big Courage
- 1989 - Jamie Boy
- 1988 - Nooo Problema
- 1987 - Dee Dee Lance
- 1986 - Stage Door Avie
- 1985 - Dr. Bee Jay
- 1984 - Exclusive Pond
- 1983 - Triple Sec
- 1982 - Explosive Wagon
- 1981 - El Baba (multiple stakes winner, undefeated in 5 races at 2, and in his first 7 races.)
- 1980 - Top Avenger (multiple stakes winner, holds fastest fractions ever run in the Kentucky Derby, 1981)
- 1979 - Real Emperor
- 1978 - Clever Trick
- 1977 - Cabrini Green (defeated John Henry three times)
- 1976 - Clever Tell
- 1975 - Go East Young Man
- 1974 - Rustic Ruler
- 1973 - Crimson Ruler
- 1972 - Rocket Pocket
- 1971 - No Le Hace (Grade I stakes winner)
- 1970 - Alhambra Gal (filly)
- 1969 - Oplayboy
- 1968 - Six Mark
- 1967 - Ranch to Market
- 1966 - Tom's Favor
- 1965 - Imam
- 1964 - Bay Phantom
- 1963 - Grecian Princess (filly)
- 1962 - Blaze Starr
- 1961 - Fortunate Isle (filly)
- 1960 - Market Road
- 1959 - Road House
- 1958 - Namon
- 1957 - Pemberton
- 1956 - Shan Pac
- 1955 - Reaping Right
- 1954 - Speed Rouser
- 1953 - Fast Charger
- 1951 - Gushing Oil
- 1950 - Bugledrums
