= 2007 state visit by Elizabeth II to the United States =

State visit by Elizabeth II to the United States
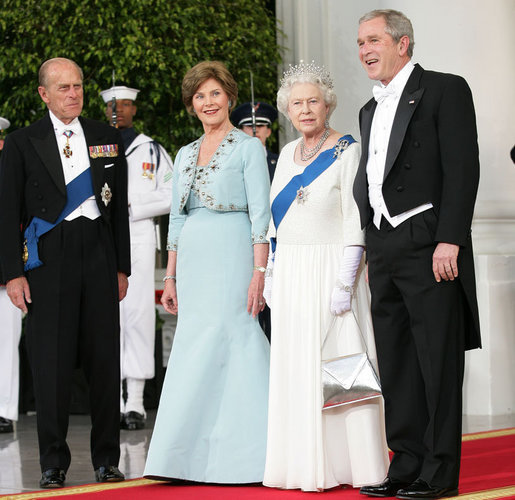
- Date: 3 to 8 May 2007
- Location: Washington, D.C., Richmond, Jamestown, Williamsburg, Lexington, Louisville, Greenbelt
- Type: State visit
- Participants: Queen Elizabeth II; Prince Philip, Duke of Edinburgh

From 3 to 8 May 2007, Queen Elizabeth II made a state visit to the United States with her husband, Prince Philip, Duke of Edinburgh. She was received by President George W. Bush on 7 May. The visit marked the last time she undertook a state visit to the United States. Bush had previously been received by the Queen during a state visit to the United Kingdom in November 2003. This was the eighth state visit received by President Bush.

== Schedule ==
=== 3–4 May ===
Queen Elizabeth II and Prince Philip, Duke of Edinburgh arrived at Richmond International Airport and between 3–4 May visited Richmond, Williamsburg and Jamestown in Virginia to mark the 400th anniversary of the Jamestown settlement. The Queen had previously visited Jamestown for its 350th anniversary in 1957. On 3 May, the Queen addressed a special session of the Virginia General Assembly in Richmond in the presence of Virginia governor Tim Kaine, stating: "This four hundredth anniversary marks a moment to recognise the deep friendship which exists between our two countries." The Queen also ment with victims of the Virginia Tech shooting. On 4 May, the Queen and the Duke were accompanied by Vice President Dick Cheney and Second Lady Lynne Cheney during their tour of Jamestown and Williamsburg. The Duke also undertook engagements in Norfolk, Virginia, visiting the families of 14 service members deployed to Iraq and Afghanistan.

=== 5–7 May ===
On 5 May, the royal couple travelled to Kentucky to attend the 2007 Kentucky Derby. The Queen was a special guest of Churchill Downs and had stated that it was one of her dreams to attend the Kentucky Derby. The Queen and the Duke then visited Washington, D.C. between 7–8 May. Upon their arrival on the South Lawn of the White House the royal couple was greeted by President George W. Bush and First Lady Laura Bush. A 21-gun salute was fired to mark the occasion and the Queen and the President inspected the troops on the lawn before delivering remarks. The President stated that the two countries "have built our special relationship on the surest foundations -- our deep and abiding love of liberty." The Queen described her presence in the American capital as "a further opportunity to acknowledge the present strength of our relationship." A state banquet was given that night in the State Dining Room at the White House, during which the President and the Queen made remarks and exchanged toasts. This followed by a reception in the East Room where violinist Itzhak Perlman performed for the guests. The ceremony was a white tie event, and the first such event hosted by the Bush administration. The U.S. media also reported that the President had received lessons on etiquette ahead of the visit. The First Lady personally oversaw the preparations and provided input for the five course menu served to the delegations.

=== 8 May ===
The Queen, the Duke of Edinburgh and First Lady Laura Bush visited the Children's National Medical Center in Washington, D.C. on 8 May. The royal couple also toured NASA's Goddard Space Flight Center in Greenbelt, Maryland and met with NASA employees and scientists. The Queen also attended a garden party at the British Embassy in Washington, D.C. and hosted the presidential couple there for dinner in the evening. The Queen famously teased President Bush for an earlier slip-up during the welcoming ceremony at the White House during which he had stated that the Queen had helped celebrate the U.S. bicentennial in 1776, rather than 1976, prompting the Queen to begin her speech by stating "I wondered whether I should start this toast by saying, 'When I was here in 1776...'"

== Gallery ==
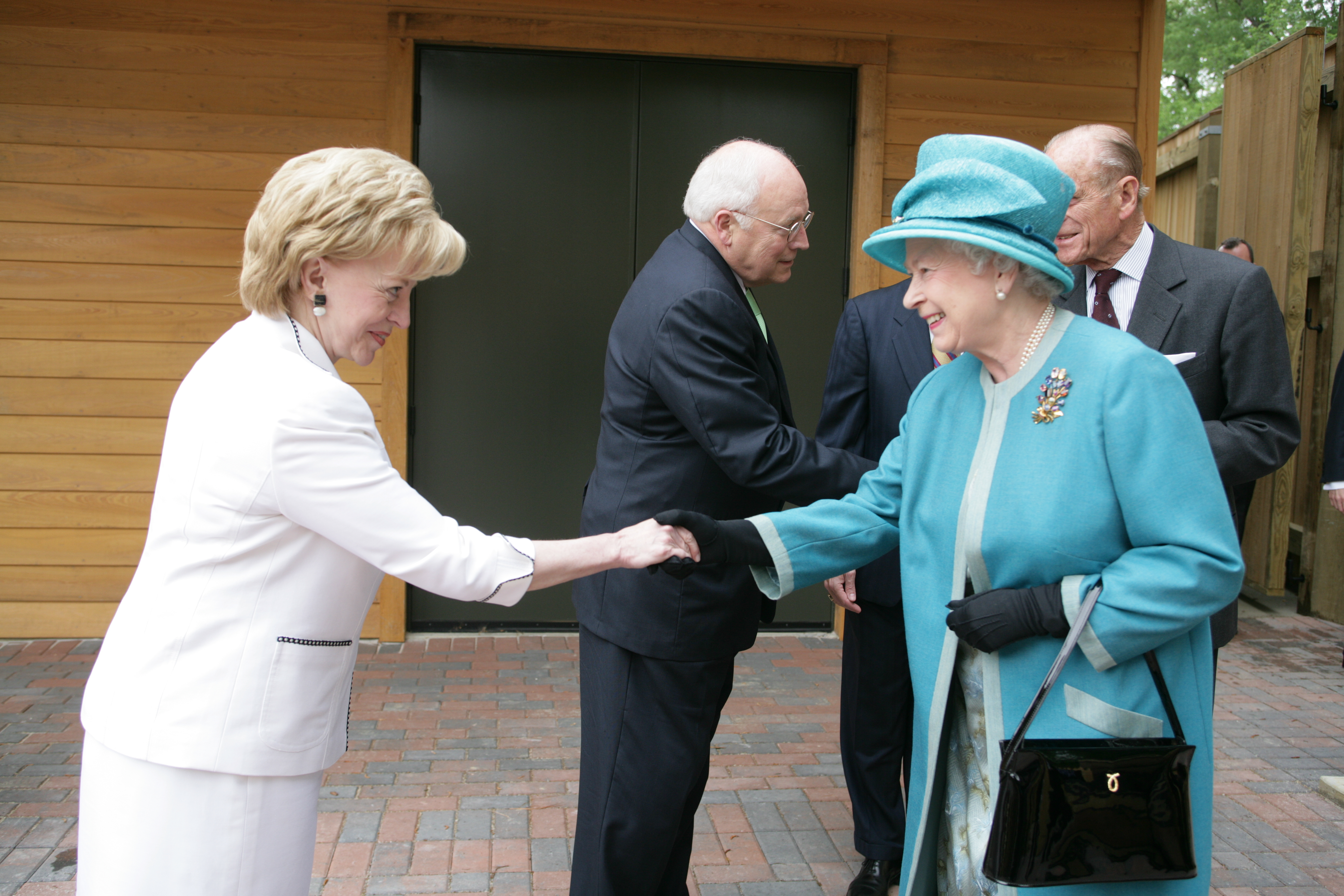
Vice President Dick Cheney and Second Lady Lynne Cheney greet Queen Elizabeth II and Prince Philip during their visit to Jamestown

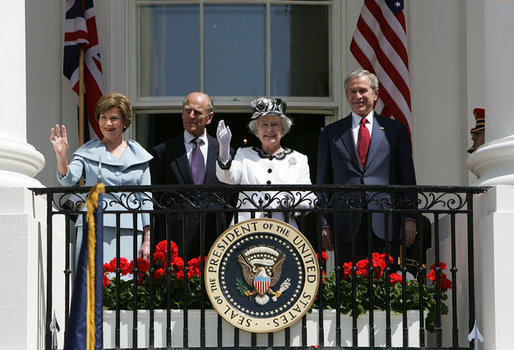
The Queen and Prince Philip join President Bush and First Lady Laura Bush to greet the crowds during the Arrival Ceremony

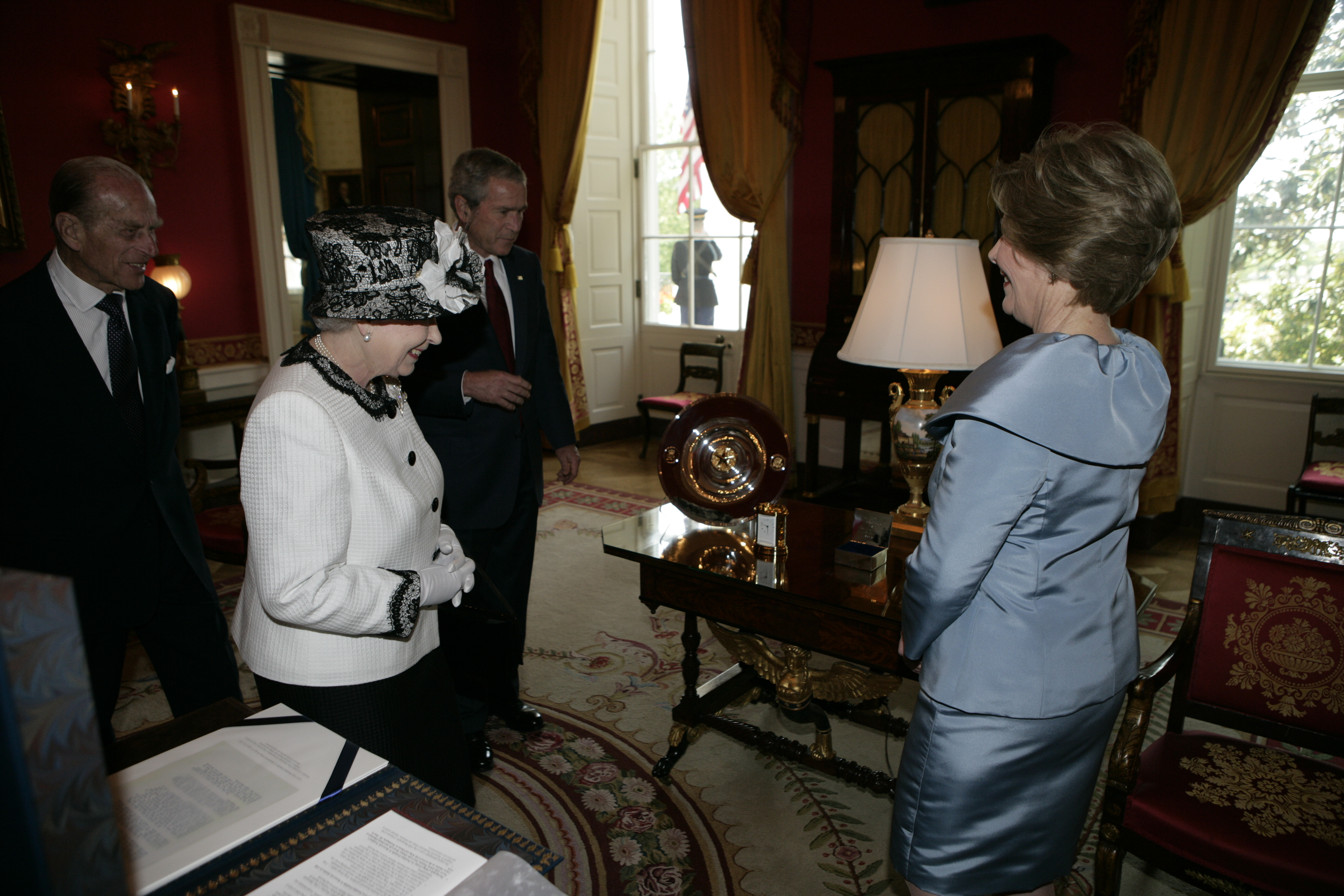
The royal couple and the presidential couple exchange gifts in the Red Room

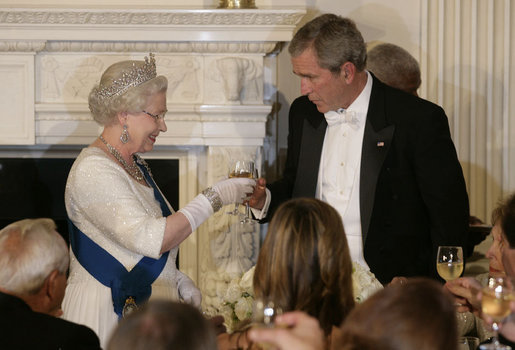
The President toasts the Queen following his remarks at the state banquet

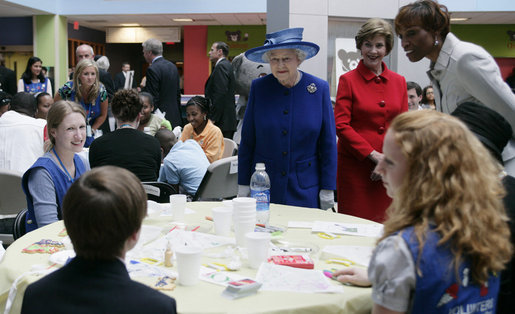
The Queen and the First Lady during their visit to the Children's National Medical Center

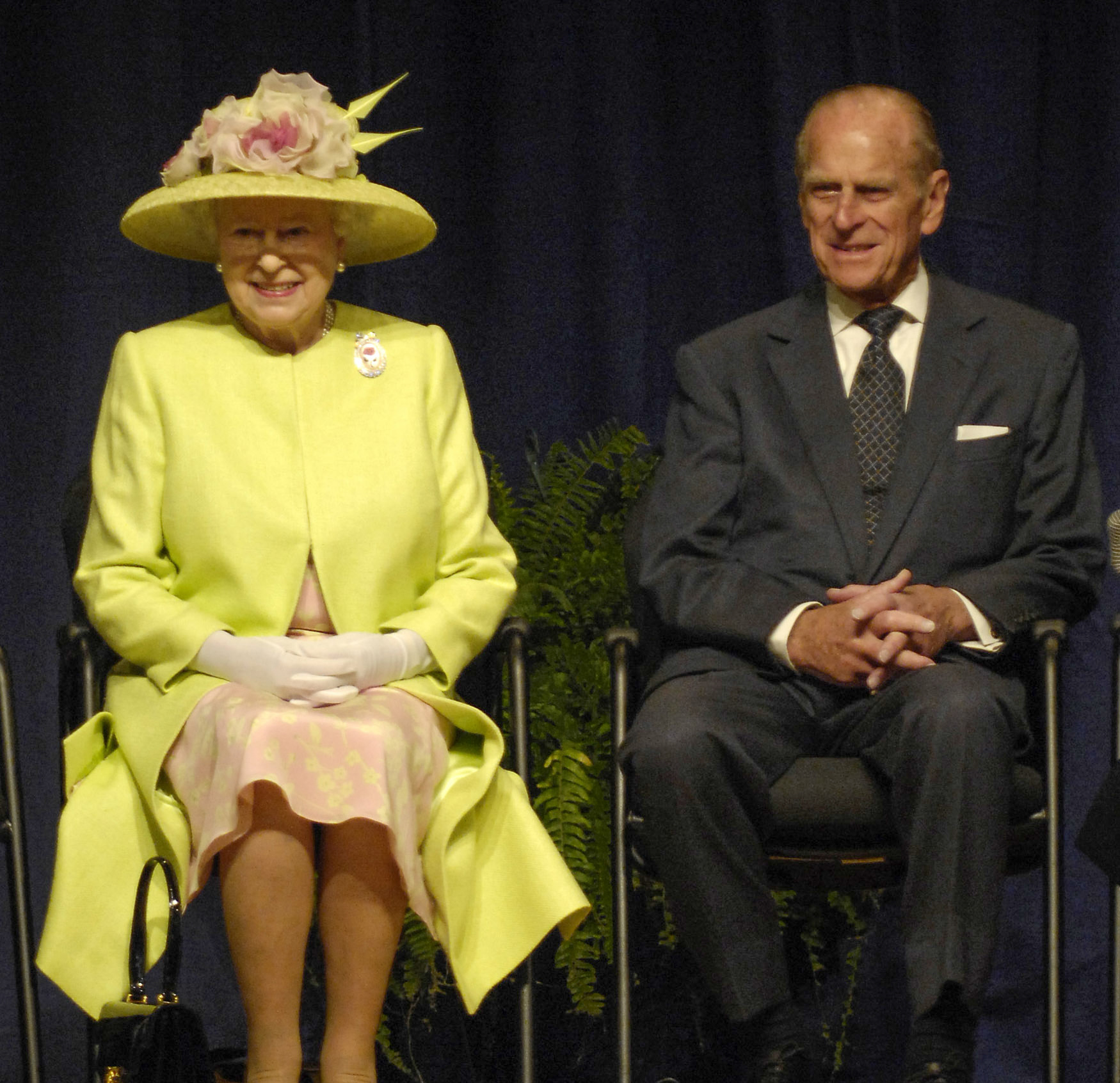
The Queen and the Duke of Edinburgh visiting the NASA Goddard Space Flight Center in Greenbelt, Maryland
