= Teuflesberg =

American-bred Thoroughbred racehorse

- Sire: Johannesburg
- Grandsire: Hennessy
- Dam: St. Michelle
- Damsire: Devil's Bag
- Sex: Stallion
- Foaled: 2004
- Country: United States
- Colour: Bay
- Breeder: Richard Giacopelli
- Owner: Gary S. Logsdon, Donnie Kelly and Jamie Sanders
- Trainer: Jamie Sanders
- Record: 20: 5-3-2
- Earnings: $621,981 (ongoing)

Major wins
- Sugar Bowl Stakes (2006); Woody Stephens Breeders' Cup Stakes (2007); Southwest Stakes (2007)
- Last updated on August 25, 2007

Teuflesberg (foaled February 3, 2004, in Kentucky) is an American Thoroughbred racehorse.

== Background ==
He was sired by 2001 United States Champion 2-Yr-Old Colt Johannesburg, and was out of the Devil's Bag mare St. Michelle. He was a $9,000 Fasig-Tipton October yearling sale. He was sent into training with Jamie Sanders.

== Racing career ==
Teuflesberg was raced heavily as a two-year-old, with 11 starts in 2006, coming in second to Scat Daddy in the Sanford Stakes before finally winning the Sugar Bowl Stakes on Christmas Eve. However, he had a habit of getting in trouble early in his races, especially coming out of the starting gate.

Then in January 2007, as a three-year-old, he placed third behind Hard Spun in the Lecomte Stakes. Moved to Oaklawn Park in February, he wired the Southwest Stakes, beating Hard Spun, who came in third. He failed to overcome a slow start in the Rebel Stakes, and placed third to Curlin. In the Blue Grass Stakes, he finished fourth by two noses and a head.

Ridden by Stewart Elliott, Teuflesberg placed 17th in the Kentucky Derby. This result led to doubt that he could run for longer distances, so he was moved to shorter races.

He won the seven-furlong Grade II Woody Stephens Breeders' Cup Stakes and then placed second in the six furlong Grade II Carry Back Stakes and second in the eight furlong Glow Stakes, ridden by Edgar Prado, his first race on turf.

On August 25, he placed fourth behind the victorious Hard Spun in the Grade I King's Bishop Stakes at Saratoga Race Course with Robby Albarado aboard.

During the running of the Grade III Phoenix Stakes at Keeneland on October 6, 2007, Teuflesberg suffered medial and lateral sesamoid fractures in his left front leg, effectively ending his racing career. He was taken to Rood & Riddle Equine Hospital in Lexington, where his fetlock was fused in surgery.

== Retirement ==
In December 2007, it was announced that a fully recovered Teuflesberg would stand his initial stud season at Hurricane Hall in Lexington, KY, for a fee of $10,000.
