= Kentucky Cup Classic Stakes =

- Class: Grade III
- Location: Turfway Park; Florence, Kentucky, United States
- Inaugurated: 1994
- Race type: Thoroughbred - Flat racing
- Website: www.turfway.com

Race information
- Distance: 1 1/8 miles (9 furlongs)
- Surface: Tapeta
- Track: left-handed
- Qualification: Three-year-olds and up
- Weight: Stakes allowance
- Purse: $300,000 (since 2023)

The Kentucky Cup Classic Stakes is a Grade III American Thoroughbred horse race for four-year-olds and older over a distance of 1 1/8 miles on the Tapeta track scheduled annually in late March at Turfway Park in the Cincinnati, Ohio suburb of Florence, Kentucky. The event currently offers a purse of $300,000.

== History ==
The inaugural running of the event was held on September 24, 1994, and was won by the 1994 Preakness Stakes and Belmont Stakes winning Tabasco Cat. He was ridden by ridden by US Hall of Fame jockey Pat Day and trained by US Hall of Fame trainer D. Wayne Lukas.

The following year the event was held under handicap conditions.

In 1996 the event was upgraded to Grade III status.

With the continual high purses which attracted quality runners the event was upgraded in 1999 to Grade II.

With the support of WinStar Farm, this race was suspended in 2010 due to economic challenges, but returned in 2011 and held at a shorter distance of 1 1/16 miles.

On August 29, 2017, after having not been run since its "revival" in 2011 and losing its graded status, general manager Daniel "Chip" Bach announced the Kentucky Cup Classic would return once again in 2018. The race was run on the Spiral Stakes undercard in March.

In 2020, Nun the Less, a gelding son of Candy Ride, became the first horse to win the race twice, having won it the first time the previous year. He also became the oldest horse to win the race, winning in 2020 at age 8. Future Prospect, a son of Giant's Causeway's full-brother Freud, had previously been the oldest horse to win, having won in 2011 at age 7.

In 2024 the event was upgraded back to Grade III by the Thoroughbred Owners and Breeders Association.

== Records ==
Time record

- 1:47.43 - Atticus (1996)

Margins

- 17 lengths – Silver Charm and Wild Rush (1998)

Most wins by a horse

- 2 - Nun the Less (2019, 2020)

Most wins by an owner

- 3 - Kenneth L. and Sarah K. Ramsey (2004, 2009, 2018)

Most wins by a jockey

- 3 - Pat Day (1994, 1998, 2003)
- 3 - John R. Velazquez (2004, 2023, 2026)

Most wins by a trainer

- 4 - Michael J. Maker (2009, 2018, 2022, 2026)

== Winners ==
Year	Winner	Age	Jockey	Trainer	Owner	Distance	Time	Purse	Grade	Ref
Kentucky Cup Classic Stakes
2026	Willy D's	5	John R. Velazquez	Michael J. Maker	Paradise Farm	1 1/8 miles	1:50.88	$295,000	III	
2025	Mercante	5	Joseph Ramos	Brian Knippenberg	Carl F. Pollard	1 1/8 miles	1:49.08	$290,000	III	
2024	Cellist	6	Luis Saez	George R. Arnold II	Calumet Farm	1 1/8 miles	1:49.33	$292,000	III	
2023	Wolfie's Dynaghost	5	John R. Velazquez	Jonathan Thomas	Woodslane Farm	1 1/8 miles	1:50.09	$299,600	Listed	
2022	King Cause	7	Manuel Franco	Michael J. Maker	Nice Guys Stables	1 1/8 miles	1:48.63	$247,500	Listed	
2021	Visitant	5	Deshawn Parker	William E. Morey	Williamson Racing	1 1/8 miles	1:50.12	$139,700	Listed	
2020	Nun the Less	8	Rodney A. Prescott	Cipriano Contreras	Crystal Racing Enterprises & Contreras Stable	1 1/8 miles	1:48.80	$140,700		
2019	Nun the Less	7	Walter De La Cruz	Cipriano Contreras	Crystal Racing Enterprises & Contreras Stable	1 1/8 miles	1:50.79	$100,000		
2018	Camelot Kitten	5	Rafael M. Hernandez	Michael J. Maker	Kenneth L. and Sarah K. Ramsey	1 1/8 miles	1:49.76	$100,000		
2012–2017		Race not held								
Kentucky Cup Stakes
2011	Future Prospect	7	Edgar Prado	Dodson Skaggs	Dodson Skaggs	1 1/16 miles	1:44.71	$169,999	II	
2010	Race not held									
Kentucky Cup Classic Stakes
2009	Furthest Land	4	Garrett Gomez	Michael J. Maker	Kenneth L. and Sarah K. Ramsey	1 1/8 miles	1:48.41	$195,000	II	
2008	Zanjero	4	Shaun Bridgmohan	Steven M. Asmussen	Winchell Thoroughbreds	1 1/8 miles	1:49.27	$350,000	II	
2007	Hard Spun	3	Mario Pino	J. Larry Jones	Fox Hill Farms	1 1/8 miles	1:48.48	$402,500	II	
2006	Ball Four	5	Willie Martinez	Patrick L. Biancone	Derrick Smith & Michael Tabor	1 1/8 miles	1:48.29	$350,000	II	
2005	Shaniko	4	Rafael Bejarano	Todd A. Pletcher	Aaron & Marie Jones	1 1/8 miles	1:49.74	$342,500	II	
Kentucky Cup Classic Handicap
2004	Roses in May	4	John R. Velazquez	Dale L. Romans	Kenneth L. and Sarah K. Ramsey	1 1/8 miles	1:49.13	$350,000	II	
2003	Perfect Drift	4	Pat Day	Murray W. Johnson	Stonecrest Farm	1 1/8 miles	1:50.43	$350,000	II	
2002	Pure Prize	4	Mike E. Smith	Claude R. McGaughey III	Ogden Mills Phipps et al.	1 1/8 miles	1:51.24	$400,000	II	
2001	Guided Tour	5	Larry Melancon	Niall O'Callaghan	Morton Fink	1 1/8 miles	1:47.90	$400,000	II	
2000	Captain Steve	3	Shane Sellers	Bob Baffert	Michael E. Pegram	1 1/8 miles	1:49.95	$500,000	II	
1999	Da Devil	4	Calvin Borel	Forrest Kaelin	Hall, Case, Glasscock et al.	1 1/8 miles	1:50.54	$500,000	II	
1998	Silver Charm	4	Gary Stevens	Bob Baffert	Bob & Beverly Lewis	1 1/8 miles	1:47.48	$500,000	III	Dead heat
1998	Wild Rush	4	Pat Day	Patrick B. Byrne	Stronach Stables	1 1/8 miles	1:47.48	$500,000	III	Dead heat
1997	Semoran	4	Kent Desormeaux	Bob Baffert	Donald R. Dizney	1 1/8 miles	1:50.54	$380,000	III	
1996	Atticus	4	Corey Nakatani	Richard Mandella	La Presle Farm	1 1/8 miles	1:47.43	$490,000	III	
1995	Thunder Gulch	3	Gary Stevens	D. Wayne Lukas	Michael Tabor	1 1/8 miles	1:49.42	$396,000	Listed	
Kentucky Cup Classic Stakes
1994	Tabasco Cat	3	Pat Day	D. Wayne Lukas	Overbrook Farm & David P. Reynolds	1 1/8 miles	1:49.42	$376,000	Listed	

Legend:
All Weather Track Dirt

== See also ==
- List of American and Canadian Graded races
