= Glow Stakes =

The Glow Stakes was a race for Thoroughbred horses held as an undercard to the Grade I Darley Test Stakes at Saratoga Race Course in August 2007. The Glow Stakes was restricted to non-winners of a turf race for 3-year-olds during the course of the preceding year, and is set at one mile on turf.

An ungraded stakes event, in 2007 the race offered a purse of $80,000.

This race was not listed as running in 2009 on the official Saratoga site.

== Past winners ==
- 2007 - Pays to Dream, Teuflesberg placed, Biggerbadderbetter came in third
