= Street Sense (horse) =

American-bred Thoroughbred racehorse

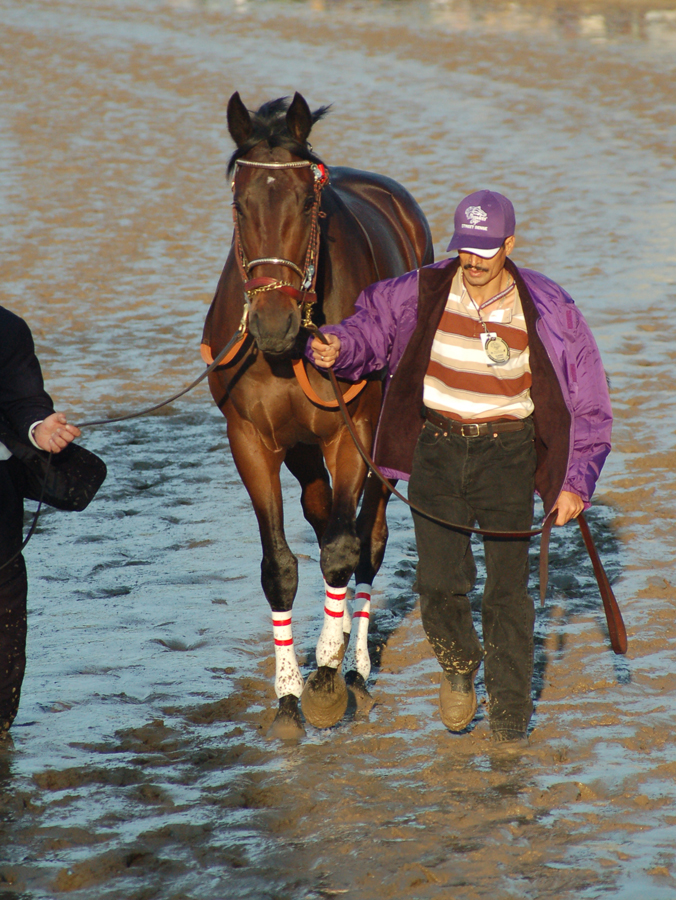
- Sire: Street Cry
- Grandsire: Machiavellian
- Dam: Bedazzle
- Damsire: Dixieland Band
- Sex: Stallion
- Foaled: 2004
- Country: United States
- Colour: Dark Bay
- Breeder: James B. Tafel at Chesapeake Farm (Drew Nardiello)
- Owner: James B. Tafel; Darley Stud (June 2, 2007)
- Trainer: Carl Nafzger
- Record: 13: 6-4-2
- Earnings: $4,383,200

Major wins
- Breeders' Cup Juvenile (2006); Tampa Bay Derby (2007); Jim Dandy Stakes (2007); Travers Stakes (2007); Triple Crown race wins: Kentucky Derby (2007)

Awards
- U.S. Champion Two-Year-Old Colt (2006)

Honours
- Grade III Street Sense Stakes at Churchill Downs (2013– )
- Last updated on 23 July 2022

Street Sense (foaled February 23, 2004 in Kentucky at Chesapeake Farm by Drew Nardiello) is a champion American Thoroughbred racehorse who won the 2006 Breeders' Cup Juvenile and 2007 Kentucky Derby and was the 2006 Champion Two-Year-Old.

== Background ==
Owned and bred by James B. Tafel, Street Sense is out of Bedazzle, a granddaughter of Northern Dancer, and his sire is the 2002 Dubai World Cup winner Street Cry.

== Racing career ==
=== 2006: Two-Year-Old Season ===
Trained by Carl Nafzger and ridden by Calvin Borel, Street Sense broke his maiden at Arlington Park. He then finished third in the Arlington-Washington Futurity Stakes and third in the Lane's End Breeders' Futurity behind Great Hunter and Circular Quay.

On November 4, 2006, Street Sense won the most important race for two-year-old colts in the United States, the Breeders' Cup Juvenile, by a record 10 lengths. He was voted the 2006 Eclipse Award as the U.S. Champion Two-Year-Old Colt.

=== 2007: Three-Year-Old Season ===
Street Sense wintered at the Palm Meadows Thoroughbred Training Center in Florida. In 2007, he followed the trail to the U.S. Triple Crown series. On March 17, in his first race as a three-year-old, he won the Tampa Bay Derby by half a nose over Any Given Saturday in a track record-breaking time for the one-and-one-sixteenth-mile distance.

Street Sense was beaten by Dominican (11th in the 2007 Kentucky Derby, having broken from post 19) in his last start before the Derby, in a photo finish in the Blue Grass Stakes at Keeneland. The slow pace of the race meant most of the field had something left toward the finish - the first five horses home were separated by only a few lengths at the wire.

Street Sense won the Kentucky Derby on May 5, 2007, paying $11.80 to win on a $2 wager. He rallied from a second-to-last deficit to beat Hard Spun by 2 1/2 lengths. This victory made him the first winner of the Breeders' Cup Juvenile ever to win the Kentucky Derby and the first U.S. Champion Two-Year-Old Colt to win the Derby since Spectacular Bid in 1979.

Street Sense went into the second jewel of the Triple Crown as the favorite, but finished second by a nose to eventual two-time Horse of the year Curlin in the Preakness Stakes at Pimlico Race Course on May 19, 2007. The 9-horse field included Derby runner-up Hard Spun, Curlin, sixth-place finisher Circular Quay, Mint Slewlep, Xchanger, King of the Roxy, Flying First Class, and C P West.

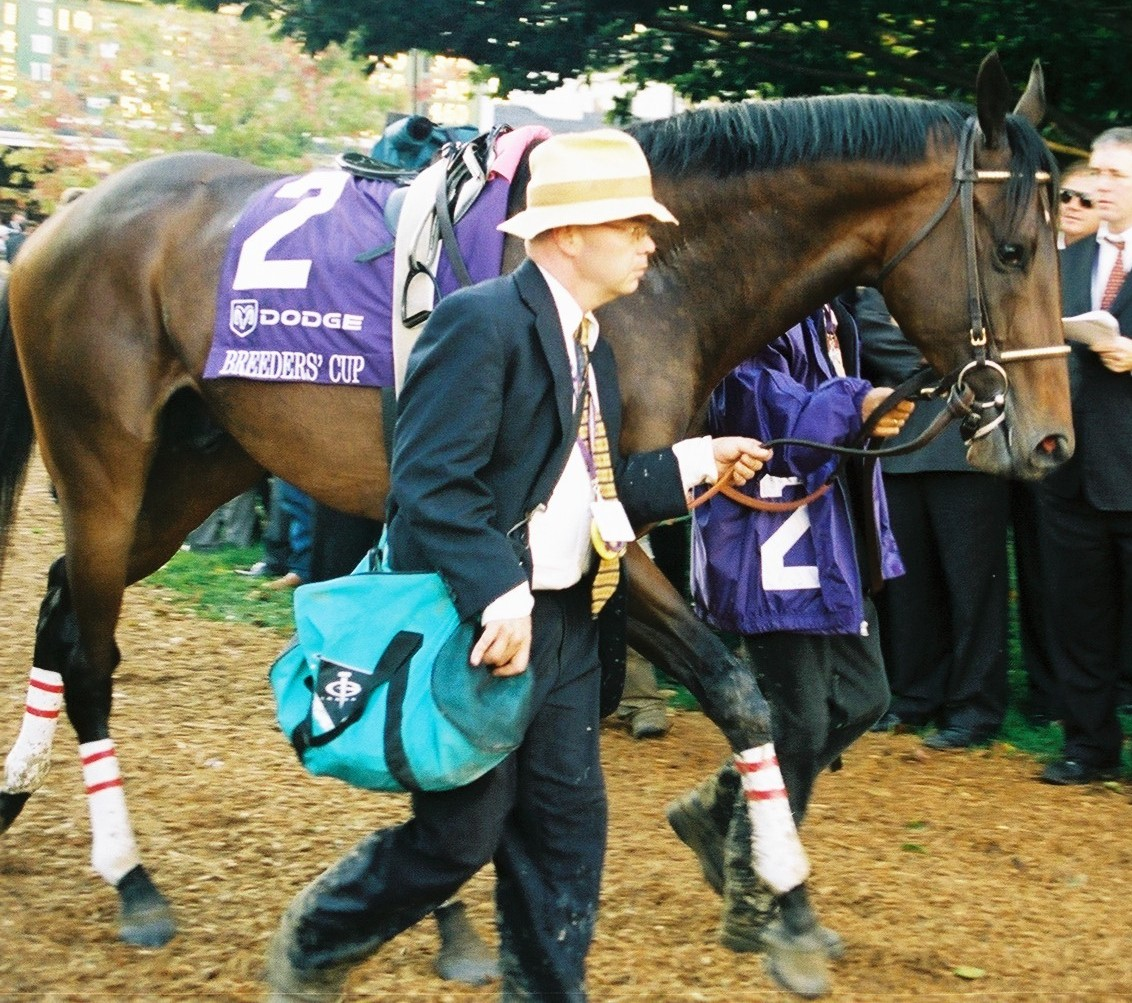
Street Sense in the paddock prior to the 2007 Breeders' Cup

Owner James Tafel decided not to run Street Sense in the Belmont Stakes, looking to regroup for major races later in the year. On August 25, 2007, ridden by Calvin Borel, Street Sense won the Grade I $1-million Travers Stakes, at Saratoga Race Course in Saratoga Springs, New York. He was the first horse to win both the Travers and Kentucky Derby since Thunder Gulch did it in 1995.

On September 29, he placed second in the 1 1/8-mile Grade II Kentucky Cup Classic Stakes on Polytrack at Turfway Park behind Hard Spun. In his racing career, he was 0 for 3 on Polytrack.

Street Sense closed out his career with a fourth-place finish on a sloppy track in the October 27, 2007, running of the Breeders' Cup Classic at Monmouth Park Racetrack. He retired to stud with earnings of $4,383,200.

== Retirement ==
On June 2, 2007, Tafel sold Street Sense's breeding rights to Mohammed bin Rashid Al Maktoum's Darley Stud. The colt continued to be trained by Carl Nafzger and raced under Tafel's name through the 2007 Breeders' Cup Classic. His retirement was announced on October 30, 2007. He now stands at Darley's Jonabell Farm near Lexington, Ky. His stud fee in 2008 was $75,000, but was reduced to $40,000 per live foal for 2011. He was exported to Darley Japan in 2013, but only stood for one year before returning to the U.S. in 2014. After covering a few high quality books of mares and siring a slew of stakes winners in 2021 & 2022, Street Sense's fee gradually rose back to $75,000 (2020, 2022, 2023).

== Stud Record ==
=== Notable progeny ===
c = colt, f = filly, g = gelding

Foaled	Name	Sex	Major Wins
2009	Aubby K	f	Humana Distaff Stakes
2010	Politeness	f	Myer Classic
2010	Sense Of Occasion	g	Doomben Cup
2010	Wedding Toast	f	Ogden Phipps Stakes, Beldame Stakes
2011	Hallowed Crown	c	Golden Rose Stakes, Randwick Guineas
2011	Sweet Reason	f	Spinaway Stakes, Acorn Stakes, Test Stakes
2012	Callback	f	Las Virgenes Stakes
2012	Dixie Blossoms	f	Coolmore Classic
2013	Street Fancy	f	Starlet Stakes
2015	McKinzie	c	Los Alamitos Futurity, Pennsylvania Derby, Malibu Stakes, Whitney Stakes
2017	Maxfield	c	Breeders' Futurity Stakes, Clark Stakes
2022	La Cara	f	Ashland Stakes, Acorn Stakes

== Races ==
Finish	Race	Distance	Track	Date
4th	Breeders' Cup Classic	1 1/4 miles	Monmouth Park	October 27, 2007
2nd	Kentucky Cup Classic Stakes	1 1/8	Turfway Park	September 29, 2007
1st	Travers Stakes	1 1/4	Saratoga	August 25, 2007
1st	Jim Dandy Stakes	1 1/8	Saratoga	July 29, 2007
2nd	Preakness Stakes	1 3/16	Pimlico Race Course	May 19, 2007
1st	Kentucky Derby	1 1/4	Churchill Downs	May 5, 2007
2nd	Blue Grass Stakes	1 1/8	Keeneland Race Course	April 14, 2007
1st	Tampa Bay Derby	1 1/16	Tampa Bay Downs	March 17, 2007
1st	Breeders' Cup Juvenile	1 1/16	Churchill Downs	November 4, 2006
3rd	Lane's End Breeders' Futurity	1 1/16	Keeneland Race Course	October 7, 2006
3rd	Arlington-Washington Breeders' Cup Futurity	1 mile	Arlington Park	September 10, 2006
1st	Maiden Special Weight	6 1/2 furlongs	Arlington Park	August 19, 2006
2nd	Maiden Special Weight	6 furlongs	Churchill Downs	July 9, 2006

== Pedigree ==
Pedigree of Street Sense
Sire Street Cry (IRE)	Machiavellian	Mr. Prospector	Raise a Native
Sire Street Cry (IRE)	Machiavellian	Mr. Prospector	Gold Digger
Sire Street Cry (IRE)	Machiavellian	Coup de Folie	Halo
Sire Street Cry (IRE)	Machiavellian	Coup de Folie	Raise the Standard
Sire Street Cry (IRE)	Helen Street	Troy	Petingo
Sire Street Cry (IRE)	Helen Street	Troy	La Milo
Sire Street Cry (IRE)	Helen Street	Waterway	Riverman
Sire Street Cry (IRE)	Helen Street	Waterway	Boulevard
Dam Bedazzle	Dixieland Band	Northern Dancer	Nearctic
Dam Bedazzle	Dixieland Band	Northern Dancer	Natalma
Dam Bedazzle	Dixieland Band	Mississippi Mud	Delta Judge
Dam Bedazzle	Dixieland Band	Mississippi Mud	Sand Buggy
Dam Bedazzle	Majestic Legend	His Majesty	Ribot
Dam Bedazzle	Majestic Legend	His Majesty	Flower Bowl
Dam Bedazzle	Majestic Legend	Long Legend	Reviewer
Dam Bedazzle	Majestic Legend	Long Legend	Lianga
