= Jamie Sanders =

American horse trainer

Jamie Sanders (born in Brownsville, Kentucky) is a former American Thoroughbred horse racing jockey and current trainer. She is the trainer of Teuflesberg who won the 2007 Southwest Stakes and finished 17th in the 2007 Kentucky Derby. Sanders is the 13th woman to a train a Derby horse in its more than 130-year history.
