= Notional profit =

Estimate of earnings in construction industry

Notional profit is an estimate of earnings primarily used in the building and construction industry. It is used to smooth out fluctuations in reported revenue due to contracts that take a long time to complete. It is calculated by the equation:

$notional\ profit = work\ in\ progress - cost\ incurred\ to\ date$

== Details ==
A contract usually takes several years to complete. If the profit on such contracts is recorded only after their completion, then wide fluctuations may be noted in the profit figures of contractors from year to year. To avoid these fluctuations in the reported profits and to reflect the revenue in the accounting period during which the activity is undertaken, the profit in respect of each contract in progress is transferred to the profit and loss account of the year by calculating the notional profit. The portion of notional profit to be transferred to the profit and loss account depends on the stage of completion of a contract.

== See also ==
- Accountancy
- Cost accounting
- Financial accounting
