= Hard Spun =

American-bred Thoroughbred racehorse

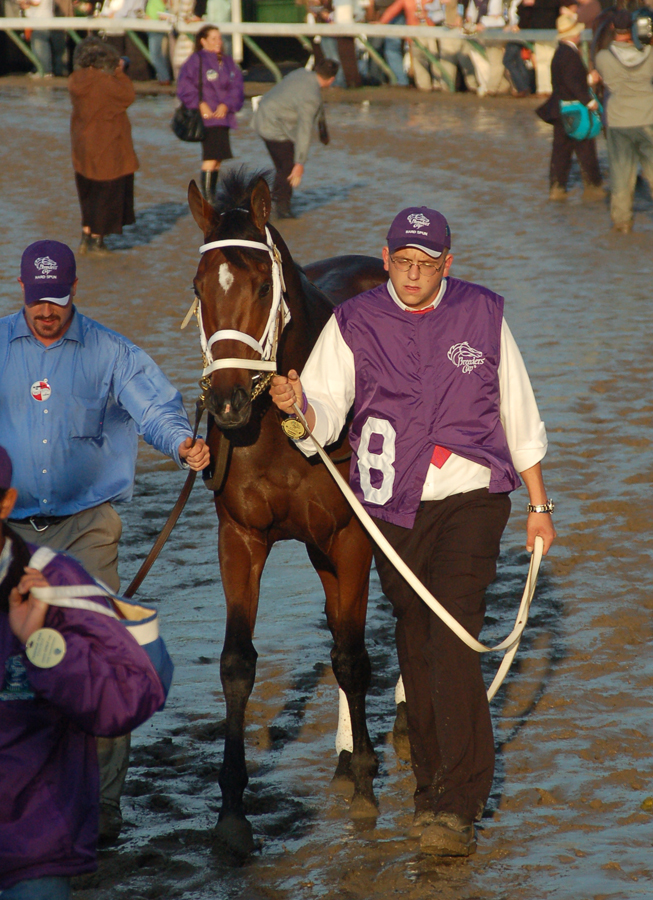
- Sire: Danzig
- Grandsire: Northern Dancer
- Dam: Turkish Tryst
- Damsire: Turkoman
- Sex: Stallion
- Foaled: 2004
- Country: United States
- Colour: Dark Bay
- Breeder: Michael Moran & Brushwood Stable
- Owner: Fox Hill Farms
- Trainer: J. Larry Jones
- Record: 13: 7-3-1
- Earnings: $2,673,470

Major wins
- Port Penn Stakes 2006; Pennsylvania Nursery Stakes (2006); Lecomte Stakes (2007); Lane's End Stakes (2007); King's Bishop Stakes (2007); Kentucky Cup Classic Stakes (2007) American Classic Race placing: Kentucky Derby 2nd (2007); Preakness Stakes 3rd (2007); Breeders Cup Classic 2nd (2007)

Awards
- World Champion 3-year-old Sprinter on dirt (2007)

Hard Spun (foaled May 10, 2004 near Malvern, Pennsylvania) is an American Thoroughbred racehorse that finished second in the 2007 Kentucky Derby.

== Background ==
Hard Spun is a bay horse with a white star standing 16.2 hands high. He is from one of the last crops of three-time leading sire in North America Danzig. Hard Spun was owned during his racing career by Wilmington, Delaware automobile dealer Richard C. Porter, who races under the Fox Hill Farms banner.

At maturity, he reached 16.3 hands (67 inches, 170 cm) high.

== Racing career ==
=== 2006: two-year-old season ===
Bred for endurance, at age two Hard Spun made his debut on October 22, 2006, at Delaware Park Racetrack, winning by an 8 3/4-length margin. He then showed he could handle sloppy tracks when he won the Port Penn Stakes on the same track by five lengths on November 14. In December, he won the 2006 Pennsylvania Nursery Stakes at Philadelphia Park Racetrack, a race won in 2003 by Smarty Jones.

=== 2007: three-year-old season ===
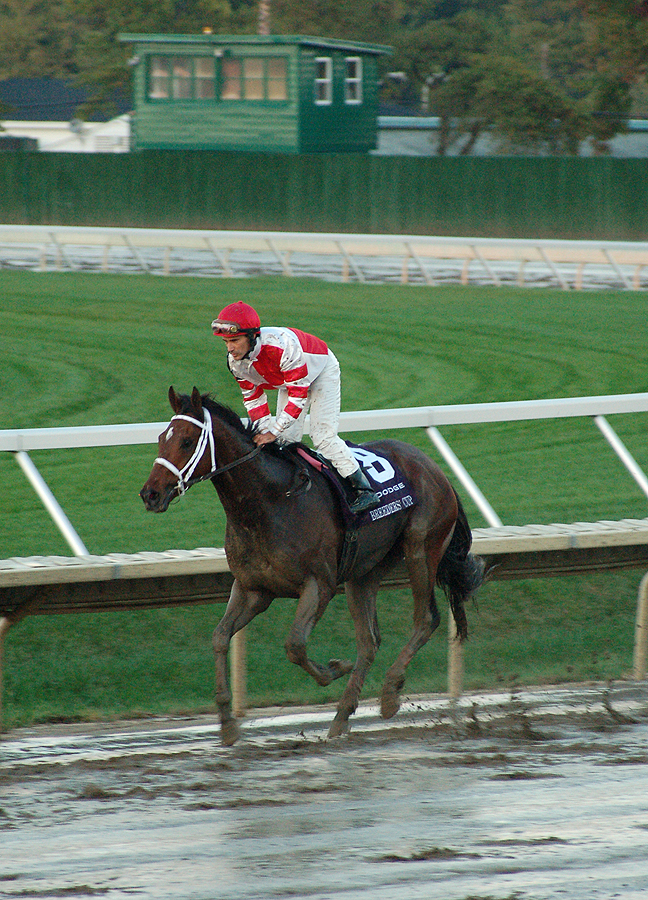
Hard Spun heads back to the grandstand after a 2nd-place finish in the 2007 Breeders' Cup Classic.

Entering the three-year-old racing season in 2007, jockey Mario Pino rode Hard Spun to his fourth straight win, capturing the January's Lecomte Stakes at the Fair Grounds Race Course in New Orleans, Louisiana. In his next start on February 19 in the Southwest Stakes at Oaklawn Park in Hot Springs, Arkansas, he was sent off as the 2-5 betting favorite. However, the colt finished fourth to winner Teuflesberg, who was ridden by Stewart Elliott. Trainer Larry Jones said that Hard Spun had a difficult time with his footing on Oaklawn's dirt surface and decided to skip the racetrack's Rebel Stakes and Arkansas Derby. Instead, Hard Spun was sent to compete in the Lane's End Stakes on the Polytrack at Turfway Park in Northern Kentucky. On March 24, Hard Spun scored his fifth win in six starts with a 3 1/4-length victory in the Lane's End Stakes in a strong time of 1:49 2/5 for the 1 1/8-mile (1.8 km) event.

Hard Spun was expected to next start in the Blue Grass Stakes on the Polytrack at Keeneland Race Course, but Jones instead decided to go directly to Churchill Downs to see if the colt could handle its dirt surface. Hard Spun passed his test and finished 2nd at the Kentucky Derby on May 5. For Hard Spun's owner, trainer, and veteran jockey, it marked their first entry in America's most prestigious horse race. Hard Spun finished third in the Preakness Stakes and fourth in the Belmont Stakes.

On June 2, 2007, owner Richard Porter sold Hard Spun's breeding rights to Mohammed bin Rashid Al Maktoum's Darley Stud.

Hard Spun ran second by 4 1/2 lengths to Any Given Saturday in the $1 million Grade I Haskell Invitational Handicap at Monmouth Park on August 5, 2007. Third place went to the betting favorite, Curlin.

On August 25, 2007, Hard Spun got his first Grade I win in the King's Bishop Stakes at Saratoga Race Course in a time of 1:22:34 over a fast track.

On September 29, 2007, he won the 1 1/8 miles (1.8 km) Grade II Kentucky Cup Classic Stakes on Polytrack at Turfway Park, beating Kentucky Derby winner Street Sense and earning not only the base purse of $130,000 but a bonus of $150,000 offered by the track to any starter of a Grade I winner for 2006 or 2007. Hard Spun finished second in the Breeders' Cup Classic.

== Stud record ==
Retired from racing, Hard Spun stood as a stallion for the Darley Stud with an initial stud fee of $50,000. He was based at the Jonabell Farm, Kentucky in 2011. Hard Spun's first two-year-olds reached the racetrack in 2011 and featured the American Champion Three-Year-Old Filly Questing.

Hard Spun has also found success as a sire internationally, siring Superlative Stakes winner Red Duke (from first crop), multiple Gr.I winning Australian Le Romain, and Japanese graded stakes winning mare Someries. He is also the sire of Lil Rockerfeller, a graded stakes winning steeplechase runner.

In 2014, son Wicked Strong was a favorite for the Kentucky Derby, but finished fourth behind California Chrome, whom he also tied with for fourth in the Belmont Stakes.

Hard Spun's most notable progeny includes:

- Wicked Strong: In 2014, won Wood Memorial Stakes and Jim Dandy Stakes, 4th Kentucky Derby.
- Hard Aces: In 2015, won Gold Cup at Santa Anita Stakes and Louisiana Handicap. In 2016, won Cougar II Handicap. In 2017, won Tokyo City Cup Stakes.
- Questing: In 2011, won Coaching Club American Oaks and Alabama Stakes; 2011 American Champion Three-Year-Old Filly.
- Big John B: In 2014, won Del Mar Handicap. In 2015, won Cougar II Handicap and Del Mar Handicap. In 2016, won Tokyo City Cup Stakes.
- Promising Run: In 2016, won Istanbul Trophy. In 2017, won Al Rashidiya Stakes.
- Ertijaal (AUS): In 2015, won Cape Derby and Sea Cottage Stakes (South Africa).
- Hardest Core: In 2014, won Arlington Million.
- Red Duke: In 2011, won Superlative Stakes.
- Taghleeb: In 2017, won W. L. McKnight Handicap.
- Lil Rockerfeller: In 2016, won National Spirit Hurdle.
- Gatting (AUS): In 2017, won W.A.T.C. Derby.
- Hard Not To Like: In 2014, won Jenny Wiley Stakes. In 2015, won Gamely Stakes and Diana Stakes.
- Le Romain (AUS): In 2016, won Randwick Guineas and Cantala Stakes. In 2017, won Canterbury Stakes and Frederick Clissold Stakes.
- Nomorerichblondes: In 2017, won UAE Oaks.
- Someries (JPN): In 2012, won Zen-Nippon Nisai Yushun. In 2014, won Cluster Cup.
- Smooth Roller: In 2015, won Awesome Again Stakes.
- Zo Impressive: In 2012, won Mother Goose Stakes.
- Maftool: In 2014, won Tattersall Stakes. In 2015, won UAE 2000 Guineas.
- Reload: In 2014, won Canadian Turf Handicap. In 2016, won Tampa Bay Stakes.
- Island Town: In 2015, won Matt Winn Stakes and Smarty Jones Stakes.
- Timeline: In 2017, won Peter Pan Stakes.
- Hard Not To Love: In 2019, won La Brea Stakes.

Hard Spun has sired minor stakes winners such as Top Score (GB), Bond Elegance (AUS), Midnight Transfer, Glinda the Good, Portmagee, Text'n Hurley, Hard Enough, and Crystal Web (AUS).

Hard Spun's 2020 stallion fee is set at $40,000.
