= Scat Daddy =

American-bred Thoroughbred racehorse

- Sire: Johannesburg
- Grandsire: Hennessy
- Dam: Love Style
- Damsire: Mr. Prospector
- Sex: Stallion
- Foaled: 2004
- Died: December 14, 2015 (aged 11); Kentucky
- Country: United States
- Colour: Bay
- Breeder: Axel Wend
- Owner: James T. Scatuorchio, Michael Tabor and Derrick Smith
- Trainer: Todd Pletcher
- Record: 9: 5-1-1
- Earnings: $1,334,300

Major wins
- Sanford Stakes (2006); Champagne Stakes (2006); Fountain of Youth Stakes (2007); Florida Derby (2007)
- Last updated on March 31, 2007

Scat Daddy (May 11, 2004 – December 14, 2015) was an American Thoroughbred racehorse who won four stakes races including the Champagne Stakes and Florida Derby. Scat Daddy retired after being injured in the Kentucky Derby, he went on to become a prominent sire.

== Background ==
Scat Daddy was sired by Johannesburg, who was a champion in both the United States and Europe as a two-year-old. Scat Daddy's dam was Love Style, a daughter of Mr. Prospector. Scat Daddy was bred in Kentucky by Swiss book publisher and racing enthusiast Axel Wend. He was foaled at Hunter Valley Farm near Lexington, whose owners privately purchased the foal and his dam in 2004. He was then sold for $250,000 at the 2005 Keeneland yearling sale to leading trainer Todd Pletcher for Wall Street investment banker James T. Scatuorchio, a former executive with Donaldson, Lufkin & Jenrette. Scat Daddy was named for Scatuorchio, whose nickname is "Scat". After his first two races, United Kingdom racing magnate Michael Tabor and Derrick Smith purchased an interest in the colt.

Scat Daddy was a dark bay horse, standing 16.1 hands (65 inches, 165 cm). He had a good shoulder and exceptionally powerful hindquarters. Pletcher recalls being impressed by the colt's athleticism, saying his only fault was a somewhat plain head.

== Racing career ==
In 2006 at age two, Scat Daddy won his first race in June 2006 at Belmont Park, then followed up with a win in the Sanford Stakes at Saratoga. He then finished second to Circular Quay in the Hopeful Stakes, before returning to Belmont to win the Champagne Stakes, defeating Nobiz Like Showbiz. In his final race of 2006, he was fourth in the 2006 Breeders' Cup Juvenile, well back of winner Street Sense. He was rated at 123 pounds on the Experimental Free Handicap, 4 pounds below champion Street Sense and second overall.

Scat Daddy started his three-year-old campaign with a third-place finish in the 2007 Holy Bull Stakes behind Stormello and winner Nobiz Like Shobiz. He came back in the Fountain of Youth Stakes with a late run to overcome a wide trip, winning over Stormello by a nose. In the Florida Derby, Stormello set a fast pace with Scat Daddy tracking in third. Entering the stretch, Scat Daddy moved past Stormello, then held off a late run by Notional to win by 1 1/4 lengths.

The colt was the third betting choice in the 2007 Kentucky Derby but finished 18th after being bumped and shuffled back. He emerged with a tendon injury on his right foreleg, which led to his retirement in June.

== Stud career ==
Scat Daddy entered stud in 2008 at Ashford Stud (Coolmore America) in Lexington, Kentucky. He also shuttled to Coolmore Australia in 2008 and to Haras Paso Nevado in Chile in 2009–2011 for the Southern Hemisphere breeding season. He was the leading Chile juvenile sire three times (2009–2011). In America, he initially commanded a $30,000 stud fee for a live foal, but this was decreased to $10,000 for 2011, then increased to $17,500 for 2012 and to $30,000 for 2013.

He was the leading North American freshman sire of 2011, and remained a success for his entire stud career. At the time of his death, Scat Daddy was responsible for 69 stakes winners and was having his best year yet, ranking #9 on the 2015 North American General Sire List. He had 36 stakes winners in 2015 including Acapulco, a group II winner at Royal Ascot, North America stakes winners El Kabeir, Pretty N Cool, Dacita, Nickname, Azar, and Almasty, and Southern Hemisphere grade/group I winners The Dream, Flyer, and Kitcat. He broke the North American record for the number of juvenile stakes winners in a season with nine. The previous record of eight had been set by his great-grandsire Storm Cat in 2002.

At the 2016 Royal Ascot meeting, Scat Daddy had two winners from two runners, Caravaggio in the Coventry Stakes and Lady Aurelia in the Queen Mary Stakes. The following year at the 2017 Royal Ascot meeting, Lady Aurelia and Caravaggio again won their respective races, the King's Stand Stakes and the Commonwealth Cup. Scat Daddy had a third winner at the 2017 meeting, Sioux Nation, who took the Norfolk Stakes. Later in the year in America, his son Mendelssohn won the Breeders' Cup Juvenile Turf and daughter Daddys Lil Darling won the American Oaks.

In 2018, Scat Daddy had a record-tying four horses in the starting field for the Kentucky Derby, including the winner, Justify. Justify went on to win the 2018 American Triple Crown and was named Horse of the Year.

On December 14, 2015, Scat Daddy was being led from his paddock when he suffered an apparent heart attack at age 11. His stud fee would have been increased to $100,000 for 2016 had it not been for his untimely death.

Scat Daddy's final crop reached racing age in 2018. Speaking of his premature death, Fergus Galvin of Hunter Valley Farm where Scat Daddy was raised, summed up the regret felt by many breeders. "It was just such a shame", he said. "You hate any stallion to pass away, but when he died, he was just on the crest of a wave. To think what he could have accomplished with proper Grade 1 mares, which he would have been getting, it could be staggering. It's staggering already – the fact that he had such international appeal, the fact that his offspring could literally run on any surface and at any distance."

=== Notable progeny ===
Scat Daddy's major stakes winners include:

c = colt, f = filly, g = gelding

Foaled	Name	Sex	Major wins
2009	Lady of Shamrock	f	American Oaks, Del Mar Oaks
2010	El Bromista (CHI)	c	Premio Alberto Vial I, Club Hipico de Santiago Falabella
2010	Solaria (CHI)	f	Premio Arturo Lyon P, Premio Polla de Potrancas, El Derby
2011	Dacita (CHI)	f	Premio Arturo Lyon Pena, Premio Polla de Potrancas, Las Oaks Carlos Hirmas A, Diana Stakes, Beverly D. Stakes
2011	Daddy Long Legs	c	Royal Lodge Stakes, UAE Derby
2011	Il Campione (CHI)	c	Premio Polla de Potrillos, Premio Nacional Ricardo Lyon, Premio El Ensayo Mega, El Derby
2011	No Nay Never	c	Prix Morny
2012	Celestine	f	Just a Game Stakes
2012	Flyer (CHI)	c	Premio Polla de Potrillos
2012	Kitcat	f	Premio Polla de Potrancas, Club Hipico de Santiago Falabella
2012	The Dream (CHI)	f	Premio Tanteo de Potrancas, Mil Guineas
2012	Wapi (CHI)	f	Premio El Ensayo Mega, Las Oaks
2013	Harmonize	f	Del Mar Oaks
2013	Nickname	f	Frizette Stakes
2014	Caravaggio	c	Phoenix Stakes, Commonwealth Cup
2014	Con Te Partiro	f	Coolmore Classic, Legacy Stakes
2014	Daddys Lil Darling	f	American Oaks
2014	Lady Aurelia	f	Prix Morny, King's Stand Stakes
2015	Combatant	c	Santa Anita Handicap
2015	Justify	c	2018 Horse of the Year. Kentucky Derby, Preakness Stakes, Belmont Stakes, Santa Anita Derby
2015	Mendelssohn	c	Breeders' Cup Juvenile Turf
2015	Mr. Melody	c	Takamatsunomiya Kinen
2015	Sioux Nation	c	Norfolk Stakes, Phoenix Stakes
2016	Skitter Scatter	f	Moyglare Stud Stakes
2016	Valid Point	c	Secretariat Stakes

== Pedigree ==
Pedigree of Scat Daddy, dark bay or brown stallion, foaled May 11, 2004
Sire Johannesburg b. 1999	Hennessy ch. 1993	Storm Cat dkb/br. 1983	Storm Bird
Sire Johannesburg b. 1999	Hennessy ch. 1993	Storm Cat dkb/br. 1983	Terlingua
Sire Johannesburg b. 1999	Hennessy ch. 1993	Island Kitty ch. 1976	Hawaii (SAF)
Sire Johannesburg b. 1999	Hennessy ch. 1993	Island Kitty ch. 1976	T. C. Kitten
Sire Johannesburg b. 1999	Myth b. 1993	Ogygian b. 1983	Damascus
Sire Johannesburg b. 1999	Myth b. 1993	Ogygian b. 1983	Gonfalon
Sire Johannesburg b. 1999	Myth b. 1993	Yarn dkb/br. 1987	Mr. Prospector
Sire Johannesburg b. 1999	Myth b. 1993	Yarn dkb/br. 1987	Narrate
Dam Love Style ch. 1999	Mr. Prospector b. 1970	Raise a Native ch. 1961	Native Dancer
Dam Love Style ch. 1999	Mr. Prospector b. 1970	Raise a Native ch. 1961	Raise You
Dam Love Style ch. 1999	Mr. Prospector b. 1970	Gold Digger b. 1962	Nashua
Dam Love Style ch. 1999	Mr. Prospector b. 1970	Gold Digger b. 1962	Sequence
Dam Love Style ch. 1999	Likeable Style b. 1990	Nijinsky II b. 1967	Northern Dancer
Dam Love Style ch. 1999	Likeable Style b. 1990	Nijinsky II b. 1967	Flaming Page
Dam Love Style ch. 1999	Likeable Style b. 1990	Personable Lady b. 1981	No Robbery
Dam Love Style ch. 1999	Likeable Style b. 1990	Personable Lady b. 1981	Porthole (Family 1-w)
