= Any Given Saturday =

American-bred Thoroughbred racehorse

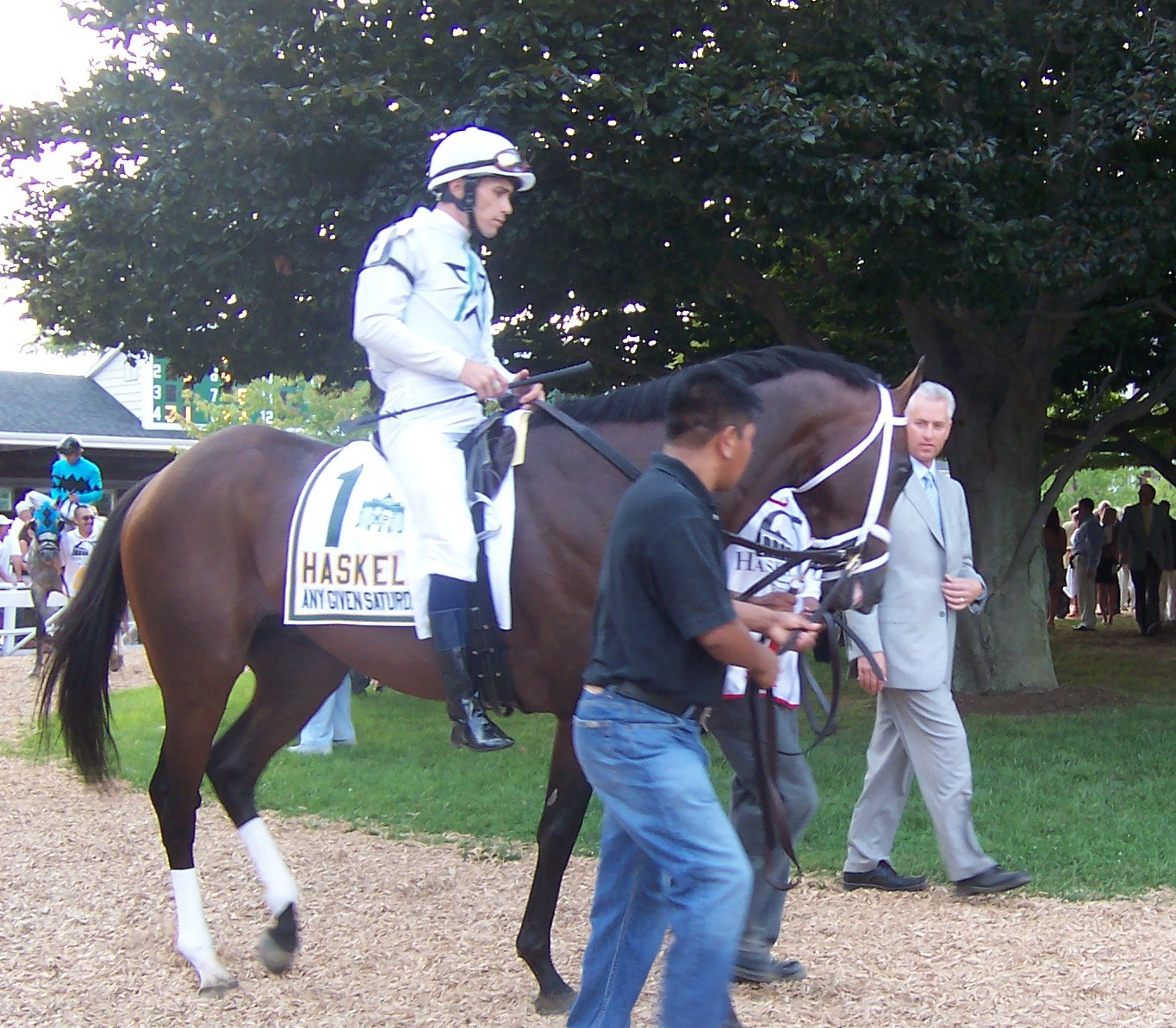
- Any Given Saturday with Garrett Gomez aboard, just prior to winning the August 5, 2007 Haskell Invitational
- Sire: Distorted Humor
- Grandsire: Forty Niner
- Dam: Weekend in Indy
- Damsire: A.P. Indy
- Sex: Stallion
- Foaled: 2004
- Country: United States
- Colour: Dark Bay
- Breeder: Racehorse Management
- Owner: WinStar Farm and Padua Stables
- Trainer: Todd A. Pletcher
- Record: 11: 6-2-1
- Earnings: $1,083,533

Major wins
- Sam F. Davis Stakes (2007); Dwyer Stakes (2007); Haskell Invitational Handicap (2007); Brooklyn Handicap (2007)

Awards
- World Champion 3-Yr-Old Miler (2007)
- Last updated on September 23, 2007

Any Given Saturday (foaled January 29, 2004) is a retired American Thoroughbred racehorse and sire.

== Background ==
From the mare Weekend in Indy, a daughter of the 1992 U.S. Horse of the Year and U.S. Racing Hall of Fame inductee A.P. Indy, Any Given Saturday was sired by the increasingly important stallion Distorted Humor, who produced 2003 Kentucky Derby and Preakness Stakes winner Funny Cide. Consigned to the September 2005 Keeneland yearling sale, he was sold for $1.1 million to WinStar Farm and partnered to Padua Stables, who entrusted his race conditioning to the United States' leading horse trainer, Todd Pletcher.

== Racing career ==
On September 15, 2006, Any Given Saturday won his racing debut at Turfway Park in Florence, Kentucky. He won again in his second outing in an October allowance race at Keeneland Race Course. Moved up to compete in a Grade II event, at the end of November he finished second in the Kentucky Jockey Club Stakes.

Racing as a three-year-old, Any Given Saturday won his first outing in the February 2007 Sam F. Davis Stakes followed by a strong second to Street Sense in the Tampa Bay Derby. Sent north to New York's Aqueduct Racetrack, he ran third behind winner Nobiz Like Shobiz in the Wood Memorial Stakes before finishing eighth in the Kentucky Derby at Churchill Downs, 10½ lengths behind winner Street Sense.

According to his trainer, Any Given Saturday came out of the Kentucky Derby with a "pretty bad foot bruise." Given two months to recuperate, by the time the colt returned to the track on July 4, he was all but forgotten as a contender in his three-year-old age group. However, he scored a four-length win in the Independence Day Dwyer Stakes, then on August 5 at Monmouth Park in Oceanport, New Jersey, he defeated highly regarded Hard Spun and Preakness Stakes winner Curlin by 4½ lengths in the million-dollar Grade I Haskell Invitational Handicap.

On August 15, 2007, it was announced that Any Given Saturday had been purchased privately by Sheikh Mohammed's Darley operations. The horse was scheduled to race for his current owners until after this year's Breeders' Cup Classic. A spokesman for Darley stated that no decision has been made as to whether Any Given Saturday would compete in 2008 at age four.

On September 22, 2007, Any Given Saturday won the Brooklyn Handicap by 2½ lengths as the favorite over Tasteyville and Helsinki, topping $1 million in career earnings. In late October at Monmouth Park Racetrack, he finished sixth on a sloppy track in the Breeders' Cup Classic.

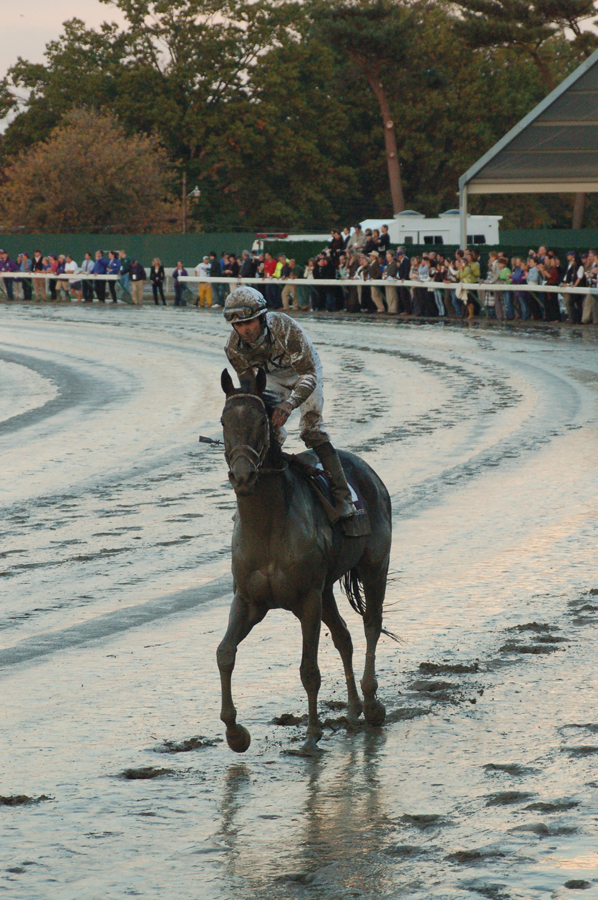
Any Given Saturday after running in the 2007 Breeders' Cup Classic.

== Retirement and stud record ==
Sheikh Mohammed's Darley Stud at Jonabell, near Lexington, Kentucky, announced that Any Given Saturday would be retired to stand for $40,000 live foal for the 2008 season.

In 2023, Any Given Saturday was retired to Old Friends in Georgetown, Kentucky.

Any Given Saturday's descendants include:

c = colt, f = filly

Foaled	Name	Sex	Major Wins
2010	Carving	c	Real Quiet Stakes
2011	Hoppertunity	c	Clark Handicap, Brooklyn Invitational Stakes, Tokyo City Cup Stakes, San Antonio Handicap, San Pasqual Handicap, Rebel Stakes
2011	Earth Connector	c	Matsudo Tokubetsu
2012	Cristina's Journey	f	Pocahontas Stakes
2013	Adventist	c	Greenwood Cup Stakes
