= Mendelssohn (horse) =

American-bred Thoroughbred racehorse

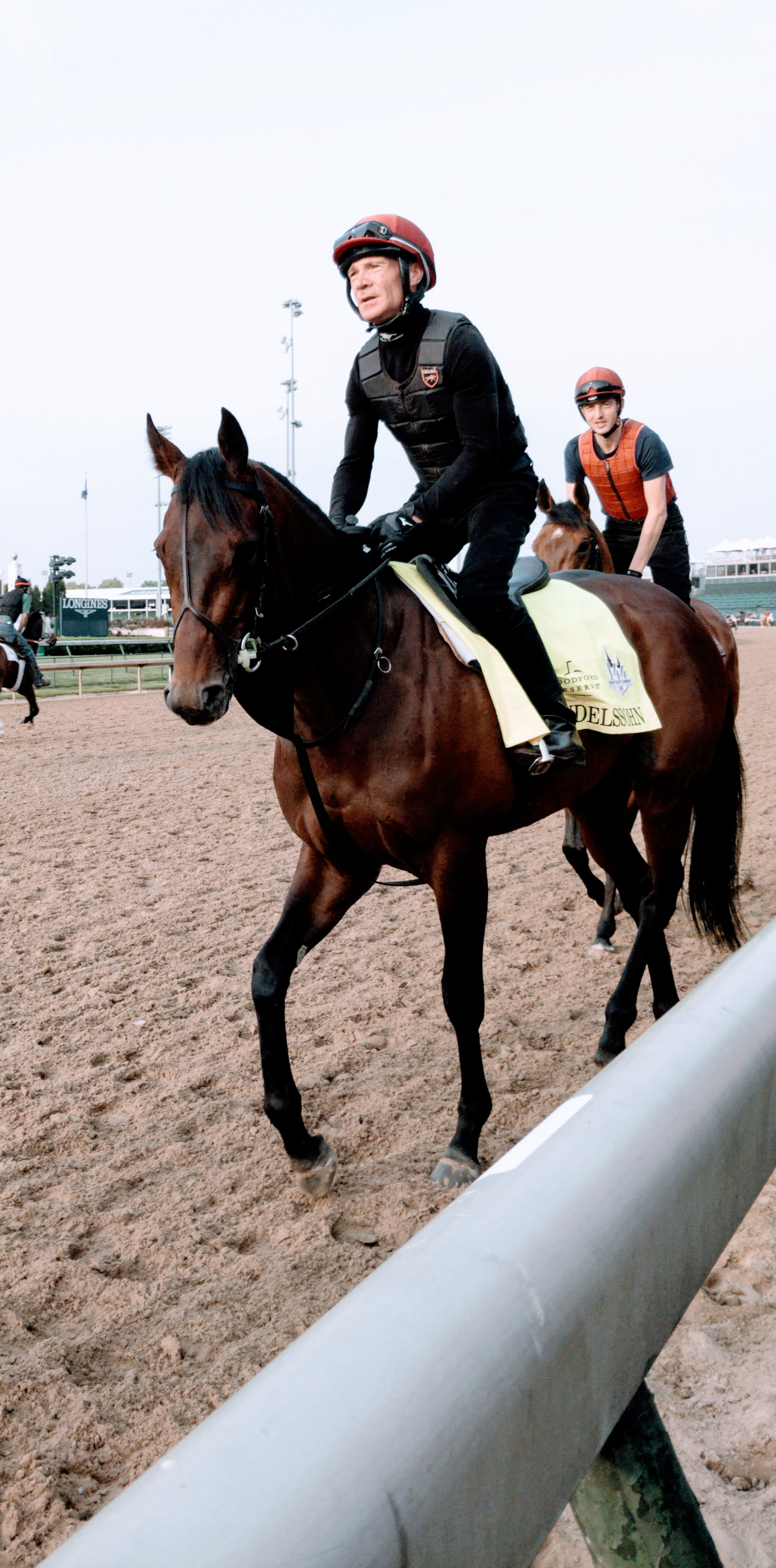
- Mendelssohn training before the Kentucky Derby.
- Sire: Scat Daddy
- Grandsire: Johannesburg
- Dam: Leslie's Lady
- Damsire: Tricky Creek
- Sex: Stallion
- Foaled: 17 May 2015
- Country: United States
- Colour: Bay
- Breeder: Clarkland Farm
- Owner: Michael Tabor, Derrick Smith & Sue Magnier
- Trainer: Aidan O'Brien
- Record: 13: 4-2-2
- Earnings: £1,889,743; US$2,542,137

Major wins
- Breeders' Cup Juvenile Turf (2017); Patton Stakes (2018); UAE Derby (2018)
- Last updated on 26 August 2018

Mendelssohn (foaled 17 May 2015) is a retired American Thoroughbred racehorse who won the 2017 Breeders' Cup Juvenile Turf and 2018 UAE Derby by over 18 lengths. He also finished third in the 2018 Jim Dandy Stakes and second in the Travers Stakes, taking his career earnings over $2 million.

== Background ==
Mendelssohn is a bay colt bred in the United States by Clarkland Farm, owned by Fred and Nancy Mitchell. He was part of the final foal crop sired by Champagne Stakes and Florida Derby winner Scat Daddy. He is out of the 2016 Kentucky Broodmare of the Year, Leslie's Lady, making him a half-brother to the champion mare, Beholder. Leslie's Lady, a listed stakes winner, is also the dam of Into Mischief a well-regarded American sire. Leslie's Lady had been bred to Scat Daddy early in 2014 but lost that pregnancy due to the stress related to the illness of her 2013 foal, who died after only three months. Leslie's Lady was bred back to Scat Daddy in late May 2014 and produced Mendelssohn on 17 May 2015.

As a yearling, Mendelssohn topped the 2016 Keeneland September Yearling Sale with a price of $3 million, making him the most expensive yearling sold at public auction in North America that year. The high price was the result of a bidding duel between Spendthrift Farm, which had raced Beholder, and Coolmore Stud, which was looking for a replacement for Scat Daddy. The colt was sent across the Atlantic and placed into training with Aidan O'Brien at Ballydoyle. The colt's registered ownership has changed several times, but he has always been owned by a combination of Coolmore partners Derrick Smith, Michael Tabor and Susan Magnier, or one of them individually.

== Racing career ==
=== 2017: two-year-old season ===
Mendelssohn made his racing debut in a seven furlong maiden race at The Curragh on 15 July 2017. Ridden by Wayne Lordan, the horse was one of three horses entered by the stable, and finished a moderate eighth behind stablemate The Pentagon at odds of 10/1. The following month, the colt was sent off as the favourite and won another maiden race over the same course. Ryan Moore rode, and despite edging left inside the final furlong, Mendelssohn won comfortably by a length over Andesh. Later, O'Brien would comment that the horse was very green in both races, and revealed he was schooled with blinkers during work.

For his next race, Mendelssohn was sent to the Group 2 Champagne Stakes at Doncaster on 16 September. Again ridden by Moore, he went off at odds of 9/1, but finished well beaten, a distant last behind O'Brien's other runner, Seahenge. Off the back of this run, he was the least fancied of four O'Brien runners in the Group 1 Dewhurst Stakes on 14 October at Newmarket. The O'Brien horses filled the first four places, and Mendelssohn finished second, two and a half lengths behind winner US Navy Flag.

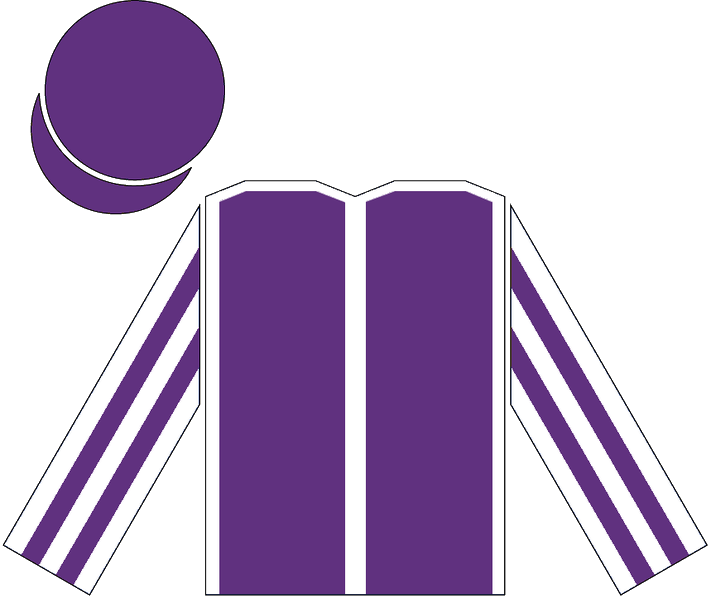
Silks of Derrick Smith of Coolmore

Mendelssohn then was shipped to the US, and closed his two-year-old season with his second win, and first at the Grade I level, winning the Breeders' Cup Juvenile Turf at Del Mar under Ryan Moore. He was quick away from post position one and settled in third behind Sands Of Mali, trained by Richard Fahey, and the California-trained Flameaway. Into the home turn, Mendelssohn responded as Moore moved out and around Sands Of Mali to open up a two-length lead. The chasers cut into the lead in the closing stages, but Mendelssohn stayed on to win by a length. "He's a big, raw horse still and he'll improve with racing and experience," said Moore afterwards.

As Mendelssohn has a strong dirt pedigree, O'Brien indicated that the Kentucky Derby was a potential consideration, especially given the creation of a European option on the 2018 Road to the Kentucky Derby. Owner Michael Tabor also suggested Mendelssohn could ultimately replace his late sire on the Coolmore stallion register.

In the Cartier Racing Awards for 2017, Mendelssohn was one of four nominees for the title of Champion Two-year-old Colt, but lost out to U S Navy Flag.

=== 2018: three-year-old season ===
==== Spring ====
Mendelssohn made his three-year-old debut on 9 March 2018 in the Patton Stakes over Dundalk's polytrack surface where he went off as the even money favorite. He tracked the pace in third place behind stablemates Threefourpence and Seahenge, then moved to the lead in the stretch to win by three-quarters of a length. O'Brien was pleased with the colt's physical and mental progress, and announced that the UAE Derby in Dubai would be his next start. "Hopefully then we can look at [the Kentucky Derby]," he said, "but obviously we have to run a big race in Dubai and go on from there but that is what we would be hoping to do. There is plenty of dirt in his pedigree and as we saw he is a good traveler and very good physically."

On 31 March, Mendelssohn entered the UAE Derby, making his first start on a natural dirt surface and his first start at a distance of over a mile. He broke quickly and moved to the lead, then set a steady pace down the backstretch before starting to open a gap on the field around the far turn. Mendelssohn eventually won by 18 1/2 lengths in a "jaw-dropping" performance while breaking the Meydan track record for 1900 metres (roughly 9.5 furlongs) by over a second. Moore said the colt was still learning and a "bit green in places", and could still get better. The performance earned a Beyer Speed Figure of 106 and moved Mendelssohn to number three on Steve Haskin's "Derby Dozen" for April 3.

Mendelssohn entered the 2018 Kentucky Derby at Churchill Downs on May 5 as the 6.80-1 third choice in the parimutuel betting. However, Mendelssohn became seriously agitated in the walk over from the stable area to the saddling enclosure and again during the post parade. O'Brien attributed this to a lack of preparation combined with the colt's immaturity. "We weren’t prepared for the level of atmosphere. There were around 170,000 people; all wet; all screaming. There was rain coming from everywhere and everyone was drowned... I cannot explain it to you. There were people and creatures everywhere and he was mind-blown by the whole thing." Starting from post position 14 in a field of 20, Moore knew the start was critical in order to get good position going into the first turn. Mendelssohn broke relatively well but was hit hard after a few strides by Magnum Moon, who broke in from post position 16. Mendelssohn settled and improved his position to sixth place as the passed the finish line for the first time. However, he was repeatedly bumped then had to check strides entering the first turn. He dropped back to ninth, where he experienced heavy kickback from the horses in front splashing over the muddy track surface. After three-quarters of a mile, Moore realized the colt had no chance and decided to ease him. Mendelssohn finished last, some 70 lengths behind Justify.

==== Summer ====
Despite the loss, O'Brien remained positive about the colt's competitiveness on dirt, with a goal of winning the Breeders' Cup Classic in November. Mendelssohn was given some time off then returned in the Dwyer Stakes on July 7 at Belmont Park. Mendelssohn went to the early lead but faded in the stretch to finish third behind Firenze Fire. T.J. Comerford, O'Brien's assistant trainer, felt that the race was a stepping stone in preparing the colt for the North American style of racing. Mendelssohn also may not have been at his best due to a virus that affected O'Brien's stable over the early summer.

Mendelssohn made his next start on August 25 in the Travers Stakes at Saratoga Race Course in upstate New York. Although the "Midsummer Derby" was missing Justify, who had been retired due to injury, the field was considered highly competitive, led by Good Magic (Haskell Invitational), Canadian filly Wonder Gadot (Queen's Plate), Gronkowski (second in the Belmont Stakes), Bravazo (second in the Preakness) and Catholic Boy (Belmont Derby Invitational). Dismissed at odds of 13-1, Mendelssohn went to the early lead, where he was joined by Catholic Boy. The two raced side by side for the first mile until Catholic Boy pulled away to win by four lengths. Mendelssohn hung on to finish second, a length in front of Bravazo. Mendelssohn's share of the purse took his career earnings to US$2.2 million.

==== Autumn ====
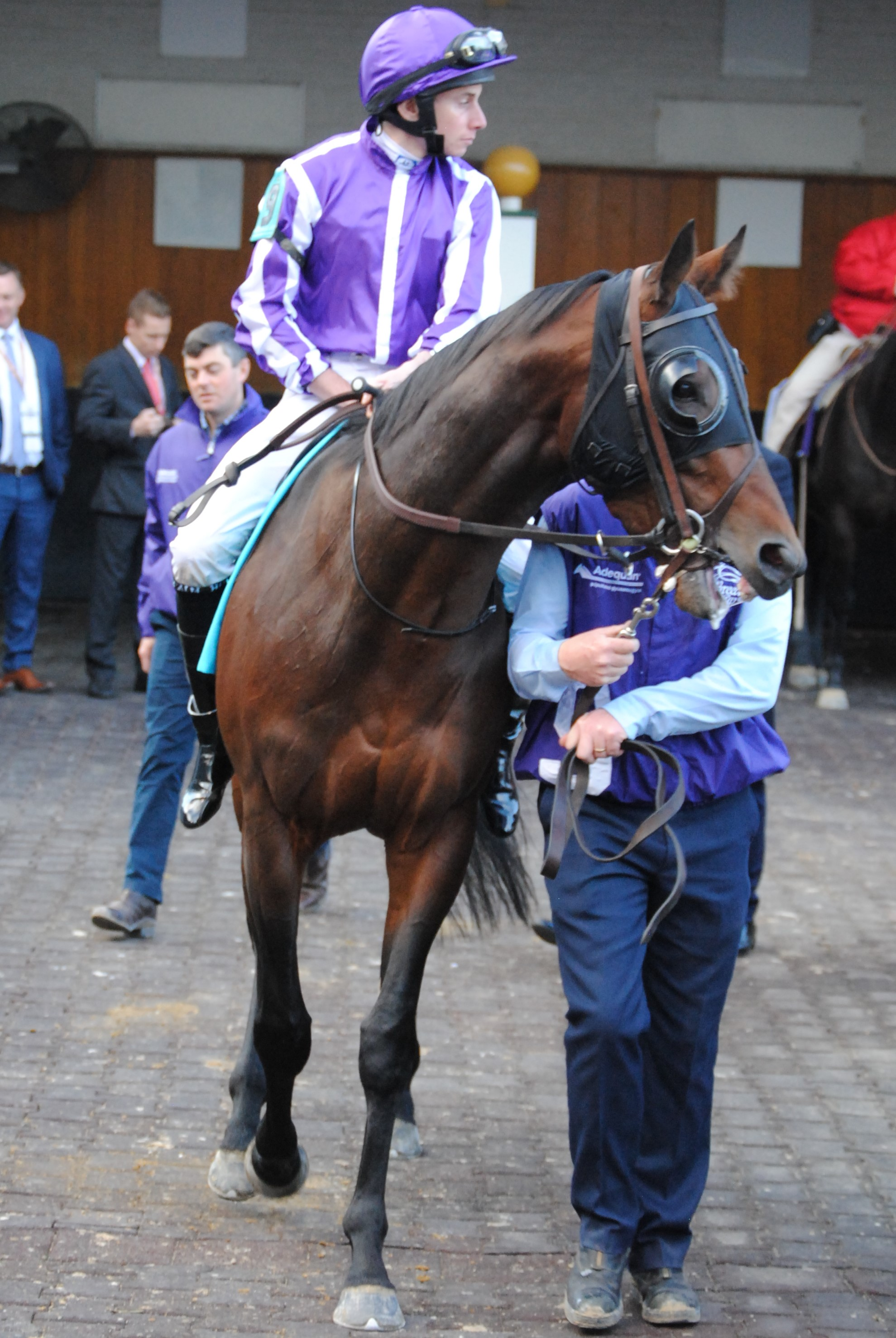
Mendelssohn at the 2018 Breeders' Cup

In the Jockey Club Gold Cup at Belmont Park on 29 September Mendelssohn was matched against older horses and started the 4.3/1 second favourite. He was among the leaders from the start and kept on well in the straight to finish third behind Discreet Lover and Thunder Snow, beaten two lengths by the winner. On 3 November Mendelssohn was one of six three-year-old colts in a fourteen-runner field which contested the Breeders' Cup Classic at Churchill Downs. After setting the pace he led the field into the straight but was overtaken approaching the final furlong and came home fifth behind Accelerate, Gunnevera, Thunder Snow and Yoshida, beaten two and a quarter lengths behind the winner. He was the first three-year-old to finish and the horses coming home behind included West Coast, Discreet Lover, Catholic Boy, Mind Your Biscuits, McKinzie (Pennsylvania Derby) and Roaring Lion.

Mendelssohn made his final start of the year in the Cigar Mile on 1 December, finishing fourth after tracking a fast early pace set by Patternrecognition. "I'm disappointed, but he ran well. He hasn't run a bad race. He's had a tough year with a lot of racing and a lot of flying back and forth," said Moore. "Unfortunately, he hasn't been able to get it done. We'll see what the plan is, but I think there's more in there." Less than two days later it was announced that the colt had been retired from racing and would stand as a breeding stallion at the Ashford Stud.

== Stud career ==
In 2022 Mendelssohn stood for a fee of $35,000 at the Ashford Stud. On October 7, Delight's victory in the Grade II Jessamine Stakes at Keeneland gave Mendelssohn's offspring his first graded stakes victory.

== Pedigree ==
Pedigree of Mendelssohn (USA), bay stallion, 2015
Sire Scat Daddy	Johannesburg	Hennessy	Storm Cat
Sire Scat Daddy	Johannesburg	Hennessy	Island Kitty
Sire Scat Daddy	Johannesburg	Myth	Ogygian
Sire Scat Daddy	Johannesburg	Myth	Yarn
Sire Scat Daddy	Love Style	Mr Prospector	Raise A Native
Sire Scat Daddy	Love Style	Mr Prospector	Gold Digger
Sire Scat Daddy	Love Style	Likeable Style	Nijinsky II
Sire Scat Daddy	Love Style	Likeable Style	Personable Lady
Dam Leslie's Lady	Tricky Creek	Clever Trick	Icecapade
Dam Leslie's Lady	Tricky Creek	Clever Trick	Kankakee Miss
Dam Leslie's Lady	Tricky Creek	Battle Creek Girl	His Majesty
Dam Leslie's Lady	Tricky Creek	Battle Creek Girl	Far Beyond
Dam Leslie's Lady	Crystal Lady	Stop The Music	Hail To Reason
Dam Leslie's Lady	Crystal Lady	Stop The Music	Bebopper
Dam Leslie's Lady	Crystal Lady	One Last Bird	One For All
Dam Leslie's Lady	Crystal Lady	One Last Bird	Last Bird
