= Todd Pletcher =

American horse trainer

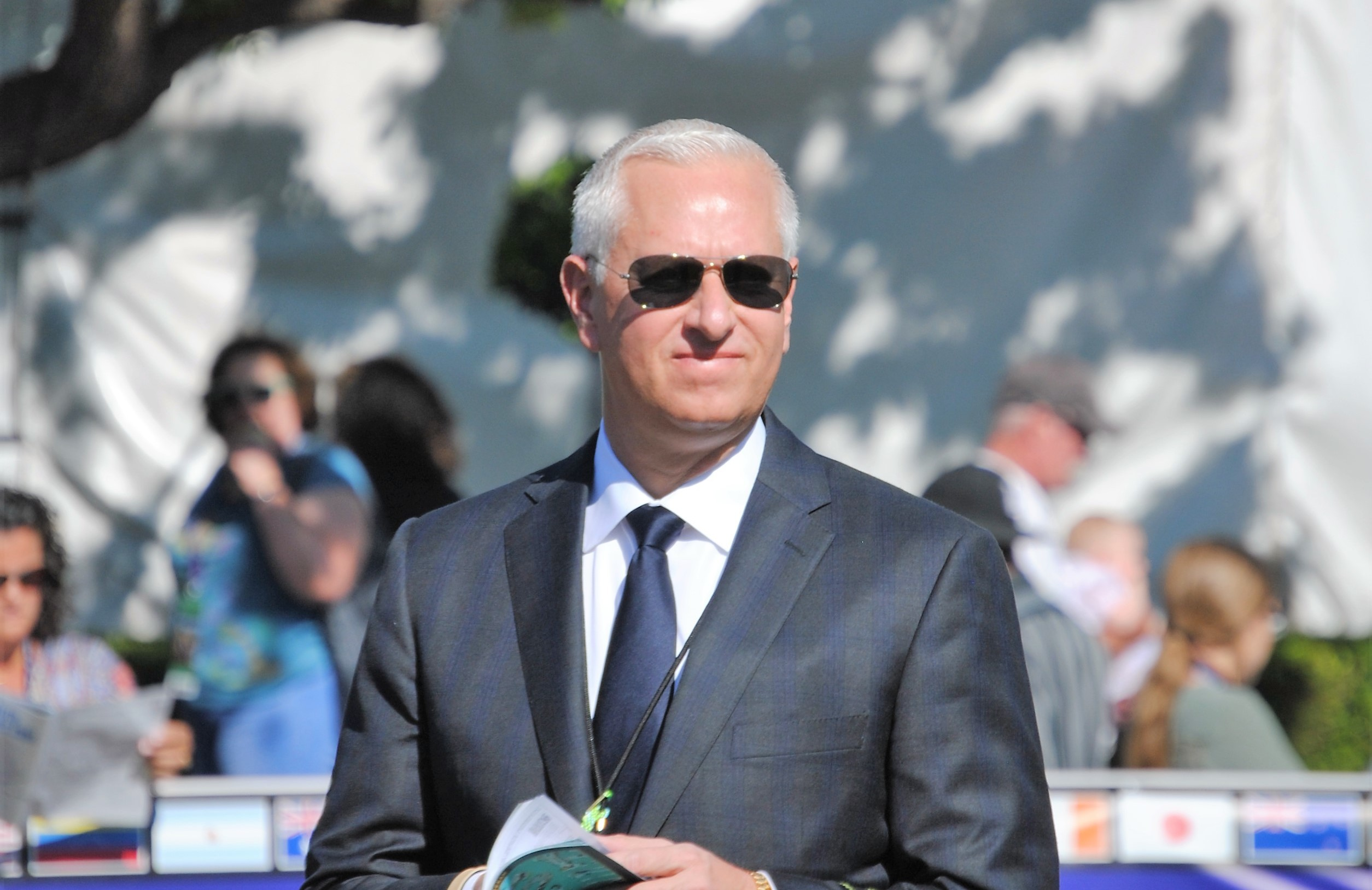
- Pletcher in 2016

Personal information
- Born: June 26, 1967 (age 59) Dallas, Texas
- Occupation: Thoroughbred Horse Trainer

Horse racing career
- Sport: Horse racing
- Career wins: 6,000 (ongoing)

Major racing wins
- Kentucky Oaks (2004, 2007, 2013, 2021); Haskell Invitational (2006, 2007, 2013); Stephen Foster Stakes (2024); Champagne Stakes (2004, 2006, 2010, 2012, 2013, 2014); Beldame Stakes (2005, 2006, 2007, 2010, 2013, 2022); Coaching Club American Oaks (2001, 2004, 2007, 2010, 2013, 2014, 2015, 2022); Metropolitan Handicap (2010, 2014); Brooklyn Handicap (2005, 2007, 2015, 2022); Alabama Stakes (2013, 2014, 2021, 2022); Blue Grass Stakes (2005, 2008, 2015, 2023); Florida Derby (2007, 2014, 2015, 2017, 2018, 2021, 2023, 2024); Arkansas Derby (2000, 2001, 2013, 2014, 2018, 2026); Pegasus World Cup (2022); Pegasus World Cup Turf (2021, 2022); Whitney Handicap (2002, 2007, 2013, 2022); Travers Stakes (2005, 2011, 2024); Personal Ensign Stakes (2006, 2012, 2022); Ashland Stakes (2021, 2022, 2024); American Classics wins: Kentucky Derby (2010, 2017); Belmont Stakes (2007, 2013, 2017, 2022); Canadian Triple Crown wins: Queen's Plate (1998); Prince of Wales Stakes (1998, 2008); Breeders' Stakes (2000); Breeders' Cup wins: Breeders' Cup Distaff (2004, 2015); Breeders' Cup Sprint (2004); Breeders' Cup Turf (2007); Breeders' Cup Dirt Mile (2015, 2021); Breeders' Cup Juvenile Turf (2010); Breeders' Cup Juvenile Fillies Turf (2010); Breeders' Cup Juvenile (2010, 2012, 2022, 2023); Breeders Cup Classic (2019); Breeders' Cup Juvenile Turf Sprint (2018)

Honors
- Eclipse Award as Top Trainer in 2004, 2005, 2006, 2007, 2010, 2013, 2014 and 2022.; Woody Stephens Award as Outstanding Trainer in 1998, 2002, 2005 and 2006 by the New York Turf Writers Association. He shared the award with Robert Frankel in 2002 and John Kimmel in 1998.; Fourstardave Award for Outstanding Achievement in Saratoga in 1998 and 2003 by the New York Turf Writers Association.; United States Racing Hall of Fame (2021)

Significant horses
- Always Dreaming, Any Given Saturday, Ashado, Bluegrass Cat, Curalina, Devil May Care, English Channel, Fierceness, Fleet Indian, Flower Alley, Harlem Rocker, Lawyer Ron, Left Bank, Liam's Map, Life Is Good, Limehouse, Malathaat, Mo Donegal, Nest Palace Malice, Princess of Sylmar, Rachel's Valentina, Rags to Riches, Scat Daddy, Speightstown, Stopchargingmaria, Super Saver, Tapwrit, ..Uncle Mo, Vino Rosso, Wait a While
- Updated on November 13, 2023

Todd Pletcher (born June 26, 1967, in Dallas, Texas) is an American thoroughbred horse trainer. He won the Eclipse Award eight times as Trainer of the Year, four of these in consecutive years. His horses Super Saver (2010) and Always Dreaming (2017) won the Kentucky Derby. He also won the Belmont Stakes with Rags to Riches (2007), Palace Malice (2013), Tapwrit (2017) and Mo Donegal (2022). He also trained Malathaat who won the 2021 Kentucky Oaks.

== Career ==
=== Early career ===
Pletcher began working for his father, Jake, as a hot walker at the age of seven. During his summers off from junior and senior high school, he went to California, where he worked as a hot walker for Henry Moreno at Hollywood Park and Del Mar Racetracks.

He graduated from James Madison High School in San Antonio, Texas in 1985 and began college at the University of Arizona in their Race Track Industry Program in the fall of that year. Between his sophomore and junior years, he worked as a groom for D. Wayne Lukas at Arlington Park near Chicago. He spent the following summer with another legendary Hall of Fame trainer, Charlie Whittingham, working as a groom at Hollywood Park. While attending the University of Arizona, Pletcher was an active member of Pi Kappa Alpha fraternity.

=== Career as horse trainer ===
He graduated from college with a Bachelor of Animal Science in May 1989 and traveled to New York immediately following graduation to work for Lukas as a foreman in the active stable. In 1991, he was promoted to assistant trainer for Lukas, splitting his time between New York and Florida. Pletcher was Lukas's East Coast Assistant until fall of 1995 where he helped develop horses such as Thunder Gulch, Harlan, Serena's Song, A Wild Ride, and Flanders. He took out his trainer's license in December 1995 and saddled his first winner, Majestic Number, in February 1996 at Gulfstream Park in Florida.

In 2004, he got his big break and trained three-year-old filly Ashado to a win in the Kentucky Oaks at Churchill Downs in Louisville. Later that year, Ashado won the Breeders' Cup Distaff. The filly went on to capture the Eclipse Awards for Outstanding Three-Year-Old of the year in 2004 and Best Older Female in 2005. Her stablemate, Speightstown, gave Pletcher a second Breeders' Cup win in 2004 in the Sprint division as well as a second Eclipse award when he was named Outstanding Sprint Horse that same year.

=== Record earning ===
In 2005, Pletcher set a single season earnings record with purse earnings totaling $20,867,842 with trips to the winner's circle in ten Grade 1 races, including the Travers Stakes at Saratoga with Flower Alley and the Blue Grass Stakes at Keeneland Race Course with Bandini.

Pletcher broke his own single-season earnings record on October 7, 2006, when Fleet Indian captured the Beldame Stakes at Belmont Park. That win proved to be the first in a day of multiple winners for Pletcher as Honey Ryder won the Flower Bowl Invitational Stakes, English Channel won the Joe Hirsch Turf Classic Invitational Stakes, and India won the Fitz Dixon Cotillion Breeders' Cup Handicap at Philadelphia Park. His purse earnings total $27,670,243. Later that year, he broke the 19-year-old North American record for most stakes wins in a year, on October 14, when the two-year-old colt Scat Daddy won the $400,000 Champagne Stakes at Belmont Park, making it the 93rd stakes victory of the year for Pletcher. The record was set by his former boss and mentor, D. Wayne Lukas, in 1987. Pletcher's 93 stakes wins included 52 graded events and a career-best 17 Grade 1 wins.

Pletcher's season included a win with Bluegrass Cat in the $1,000,000 Haskell Invitational at Monmouth Park following the colt's second-place finishes in the Kentucky Derby and Belmont Stakes.

=== Awards ===
In the 2007 Belmont Stakes, Pletcher earned his first win in a Triple Crown race when Rags to Riches became the first filly to win that race since 1905.

After missing the winner's circle with 24 previous entries, Pletcher won his first Kentucky Derby on May 1, 2010, with Super Saver, the 8-1 second choice, with jockey Calvin Borel aboard.

In 2013, Pletcher's Palace Malice, ridden by Mike Smith, won the 2013 Belmont Stakes.

In May 2014, the 140th Kentucky Derby featured four of his horses: Danza, Intense Holiday, Vinceremos and We Miss Artie. In May 2015, the 141st Kentucky Derby featured three more of his horses: Materiality, Itsaknockout, and Carpe Diem. They each finished 6th, 9th, and 10th, respectively.

In 2017, he won the Kentucky Derby a second time with Always Dreaming who was looked after for and taken care by Chris Murphy of Long Island (Nephew to the Eclipse Award winner of 1986, Declan Murphy).

== Honors ==
Pletcher has amassed numerous training titles in New York, Kentucky and Florida, including five consecutive titles at the Saratoga summer meet. He has received several Fourstardave (for Special Achievement at Saratoga Race Course) and Woody Stephens (for outstanding trainer) Awards from the New York Turf Writers Association. He is also a recipient of multiple Eclipse Awards.

In 2021, Todd Pletcher was voted into the United States Racing Hall of Fame.

== Personal life ==
Pletcher and his wife, Tracy, live in Garden City, Long Island, New York. They have three children, Payton, Kyle, and Hannah.

== Triple Crown Race Record ==
Year	Kentucky Derby	Finish	Preakness	Finish	Belmont	Finish
2000	Impeachment	3rd	Impeachment	3rd	Impeachment	5th
2000	More Then Ready	4th	-	-	-	-
2000	Trippi	11th	-	-	-	-
2000	Graeme Hall	19th	-	-	-	-
2001	Invisible Ink	2nd	-	-	Invisible Ink	5th
2001	Balto Star	14th	-	-	Balto Star	8th
2002	Wild Horses	18th	-	-	-	-
2004	Limehouse	4th	-	-	-	-
2004	Pollard's Vision	17th	-	-	-	-
2004	-	-	-	-	Purge	9th
2005	Flower Alley	9th	-	-	-	-
2005	Coin Silver	12th	-	-	-	-
2005	Bandini	19th	-	-	-	-
2006	Bluegrass Cat	2nd	-	-	Bluegrass Cat	2nd
2006	Keyed Entry	20th	-	-	-	-
2006	-	-	-	-	Sunriver	3rd
2007	-	-	-	-	Rags to Riches †	1st
2007	Circular Quay	6th	Circular Quay	5th	-	-
2007	-	-	King of the Roxy	6th	-	-
2007	Any Given Saturday	8th	-	-	-	-
2007	Sam P.	9th	-	-	-	-
2007	Scat Daddy	18th	-	-	-	-
2007	Cowtown Cat	20th	-	-	-	-
2008	Cowboy Cal	9th	-	-	-	-
2008	Monba	20th	-	-	-	-
2008	-	-	-	-	Ready's Echo	3rd ‡
2009	Join In The Dance	7th	-	-	-	-
2009	Dunkirk	11th	-	-	Dunkirk	3rd
2009	Advice	13th	-	-	-	-
2009	-	-	Take the Points	13th	-	-
2010	Super Saver	1st	Super Saver	8th	-	-
2010	Mission Impazible	9th	-	-	-	-
2010	Devil May Care †	10th	-	-	-	-
2010	Discreetly Mine	13th	-	-	-	-
2010	-	-	Aikenite	10th	-	-
2010	-	-	-	-	Interactif	6th
2011	Stay Thirsty	12th	-	-	Stay Thirsty	2nd
2011	-	-	Dance City	5th	-	-
2012	El Padrino	13th	-	-	-	-
2012	Gemologist	16th	-	-	-	-
2013	Revolutionary	3rd	-	-	Revolutionary	5th
2013	Charming Kitten	9th	-	-	-	-
2013	Overanalyze	11th	-	-	Overanalyze	7th
2013	Palace Malice	12th	-	-	Palace Malice	1st
2013	Verrazano	14th	-	-	-	-
2013	-	-	-	-	Unlimited Budget †	6th
2013	-	-	-	-	Midnight Taboo	12th
2014	Danza	3rd	-	-	-	-
2014	We Miss Artie	10th	-	-	-	-
2014	Intense Holiday	12th	-	-	-	-
2014	Vinceremos	17th	-	-	-	-
2014	-	-	-	-	Commissioner	2nd
2014	-	-	-	-	Matterhorn	8th
2015	Materiality	6th	-	-	Materiality	8th
2015	Itsaknockout	9th	-	-	-	-
2015	Carpe Diem	10th	-	-	-	-
2015	-	-	-	-	Made From Lucky	6th
2016	Destin	6th	-	-	Destin	2nd
2016	Outwork	14th	-	-	-	-
2016	-	-	Stradivari	4th	Stradivari	5th
2017	Always Dreaming	1st	Always Dreaming	8th	-	-
2017	Tapwrit	6th	-	-	Tapwrit	1st
2017	Patch	14th	-	-	Patch	3rd
2018	Audible	3rd	-	-	-	-
2018	Vino Rosso	9th	-	-	Vino Rosso	4th
2018	Noble Indy	17th	-	-	Noble Indy	10th
2018	Magnum Moon	19th	-	-	-	-
2019	Cutting Humor	10th	-	-	-	-
2019	Spinoff	18th	-	-	Spinoff	6th
2019	-	-	-	-	Intrepid Heart	8th
2020	Money Moves	13th	-	-	-	-
2020	-	-	-	-	Farmington Road	8th
2020	-	-	-	-	Dr. Post	2nd
2021	Known Agenda	9th	-	-	Known Agenda	4th
2021	Sainthood	11th	-	-	-	-
2021	Bourbonic	13th	-	-	Bourbonic	5th
2021	-	-	-	-	Overtook	7th
2026	Renegade	2nd				

† - Filly

‡ - Dead Heat
