= Great Hunter =

American Thoroughbred racehorse

- Sire: Aptitude
- Grandsire: A.P. Indy
- Dam: Zenith
- Damsire: Roy
- Sex: Stallion
- Foaled: 2004
- Country: United States
- Colour: Dark Bay
- Breeder: Ivy Dell Stud
- Owner: J. Paul Reddam
- Trainer: Doug O'Neill
- Record: 17: 3-4-2
- Earnings: $976,260

Major wins
- Breeders' Futurity Stakes (2006); Robert B. Lewis Stakes (2007)
- Last updated on April 17, 2007

Great Hunter (foaled March 31, 2004, in Pennsylvania) is an American Thoroughbred racehorse. His breeder sold him in the September 2005 Keeneland Sales to Ilona Whetstone. The colt was resold in June 2006 to J. Paul Reddam for $550,000 but has been the subject of a legal dispute following a lien claim by Fifth Third Bank for indebtedness of the financially strapped Ilona Whetstone.

== Career ==
Racing at age two, Great Hunter was owned by Reddam and trained by Doug O'Neill. He won the 2006 Grade I Lane's End Breeders' Futurity. in which he defeated Circular Quay and Street Sense. but then finished third behind them in the Breeders' Cup Juvenile.

=== 2007 ===
In 2007. Great Hunter won the Grade II Robert B. Lewis Stakes. then was fifth in the Blue Grass Stakes after he ran into severe difficulty from two other horses and was taken up sharply by his jockey, Corey Nakatani.

Great Hunter and stablemate Liquidity ran in the May 5 Kentucky Derby. The pair came in 13th and 14th, respectively.

Great Hunter skipped the Preakness but was confirmed as a starter in the Belmont. However, he chipped his right front ankle during a workout and missed the race. The injury required surgery and a long recovery period.

Great Hunter returned to training in November and ran in the Grade 1 Malibu Stakes at Santa Anita on December 26, 2007. The colt placed 11th, just ahead of Cobalt Blue.

=== 2008 and 2009 ===
On January 12, 2008, Great Hunter finished sixth in the Grade 2 San Fernando Stakes at Santa Anita. He then placed fourth in the Grade 2 Strub Stakes at Santa Anita on February 2, 2008. On March 1, 2008, he placed 8th in the G1 Santa Anita Handicap.

Despite his lackluster performances since returning to training, Great Hunter was shipped to Nad Al Sheba Racecourse in Dubai, United Arab Emirates, to participate in the 2008 GI Dubai World Cup. He moved up at the top of the stretch, but then flattened out at the eighth pole and placed fifth. The horse had one unplaced start in 2009 and was retired to stud in 2010.

== Stud ==
Great Hunter currently stands at Haras Los Samanes Polo & Racing in Santa Barbara, Venezuela, for a private-listed stud fee. His first foals were born in 2011.
