= Circular Quay (horse) =

American-bred Thoroughbred racehorse

- Sire: Thunder Gulch
- Grandsire: Gulch
- Dam: Circle of Life
- Damsire: Belong to Me
- Sex: Colt
- Foaled: 2004
- Country: United States
- Colour: Chestnut
- Breeder: Doreen Tabor
- Owner: Michael Tabor
- Trainer: Todd Pletcher
- Record: 13: 5-2-0
- Earnings: $1,505,434 (to date)

Major wins
- Bashford Manor Stakes (2006); Hopeful Stakes (2006); Louisiana Derby (2007); New Orleans Handicap (2008)
- Last updated on December 5, 2007

Circular Quay (foaled February 26, 2004 in Kentucky) is a thoroughbred racehorse who was a 2007 Kentucky Derby contender. The son of 1995 Belmont Stakes and Kentucky Derby winner Thunder Gulch is owned by Michael Tabor and was trained by Todd Pletcher.

== Race career ==
Circular Quay won his maiden at Churchill Downs in June 2006, and after his subsequent victories in the Bashford Manor Stakes and the Hopeful Stakes, he was ranked on top of the Breeders' Cup Juvenile Division poll. Then came the October 7 Lane's End Breeders' Futurity, a race in which he was the heavy 2-5 favorite. With jockey Garrett Gomez in the saddle, the colt finished second, 1 3/4 lengths behind winner Great Hunter. In the Breeders' Cup Juvenile at Churchill Downs on November 5, he finished second behind Street Sense, who won the race by 10 lengths.

In his first race as a 3-year-old in the Grade III Risen Star Stakes on February 10, 2007, at Fair Grounds Race Course, Circular Quay finished fifth after he faced traffic trouble when the horse in front of him, Slew's Tizzy, clipped heels with Makeithapencaptain and lost jockey James Graham.

The colt won the March 10 Louisiana Derby as his final prep for The May 5 Kentucky Derby, where he was one of five Pletcher entries and finished sixth after the eight-week layoff between races. Two weeks later, he was one of two entries for Pletcher in the 2007 Preakness Stakes, where he finished fifth in the field of nine.

After skipping the Belmont Stakes, Circular Quay made his first start on grass and final start as a 3-year-old and was the favorite in the Grade II Virginia Derby at Colonial Downs. However, he was not a factor and finished sixth.

== 2008 racing season ==
Circular Quay made his 2008 debut on March 8 in the New Orleans Handicap with a win.

== Stud career ==
The first reported foal for Circular Quay was a filly out of Destiny's Yield (by High Yield) born on January 15, 2010, at Destiny Oaks Farms in Ocala, Florida. He currently stands at the Journeyman Stud in Ocala, Florida for a fee of $6,500.

During the summer of 2014, Circular Quay was sold and now stands in Panama.

Circular Quay's descendants include:

c = colt, f = filly

Foaled	Name	Sex	Major Wins
2010	Reporting Star	c	Appleton Stakes
2014	Stormy Embrace	c	Princess Rooney Stakes

== Races ==
Finish	Race	Distance	Track	Date
1st	New Orleans Handicap	One and One-Eighth miles	Fair Grounds Race Course	March 8, 2008
6th	Virginia Derby	One and One-Quarter Miles (Turf)	Colonial Downs	July 21, 2007
5th	Preakness Stakes	One and Three-Sixteenths Miles	Pimlico Race Course	May 19, 2007
6th	Kentucky Derby	One and One-Quarter Miles	Churchill Downs	May 5, 2007
1st	Louisiana Derby	One and One-Sixteenth Miles	Fair Grounds Race Course	March 10, 2007
5th	Risen Star Stakes	One and One-Sixteenth Miles	Fair Grounds Race Course	February 10, 2007
2nd	Breeders' Cup Juvenile	One and One-Sixteenth Miles	Churchill Downs	November 4, 2006
2nd	Breeders' Futurity Stakes	One and One-Sixteenth Miles	Keeneland Race Course	October 7, 2006
1st	Hopeful Stakes	Seven Furlongs	Saratoga Race Course	September 4, 2006
1st	Bashford Manor Stakes	Six Furlongs	Churchill Downs	July 8, 2006
1st	Maiden Special Weight	Five and One-Half Furlongs	Churchill Downs	June 15, 2006

== Pedigree ==
Pedigree of Circular Quay
Sire Thunder Gulch	Gulch	Mr. Prospector	Raise a Native
Sire Thunder Gulch	Gulch	Mr. Prospector	Gold Digger
Sire Thunder Gulch	Gulch	Jameela	Rambunctious
Sire Thunder Gulch	Gulch	Jameela	Asbury Mary
Sire Thunder Gulch	Line of Thunder	Storm Bird	Northern Dancer
Sire Thunder Gulch	Line of Thunder	Storm Bird	South Ocean
Sire Thunder Gulch	Line of Thunder	Shoot a Line	High Line
Sire Thunder Gulch	Line of Thunder	Shoot a Line	Death Ray
Dam Circle of Life	Belong to Me	Danzig	Northern Dancer
Dam Circle of Life	Belong to Me	Danzig	Pas de Nom
Dam Circle of Life	Belong to Me	Belonging	Exclusive Native
Dam Circle of Life	Belong to Me	Belonging	Straight Deal
Dam Circle of Life	Concentric	Shadeed	Nijinsky
Dam Circle of Life	Concentric	Shadeed	Continual
Dam Circle of Life	Concentric	Magic Circle	Alydar
Dam Circle of Life	Concentric	Magic Circle	Golden Circlet

== Name ==
Circular Quay (pronounced "Key") is a locality of Sydney, Australia. It is the site of the first European settlement in Australia and is now a major transport hub for the city's central business district within several hundred metres of the Sydney Opera House.
