= Puca (horse) =

American-bred Thoroughbred racehorse

- Sire: Big Brown
- Grandsire: Boundary
- Dam: Boat's Ghost
- Damsire: Silver Ghost
- Sex: Mare
- Foaled: May 17, 2012
- Country: Kentucky, United States
- Colour: Bay
- Breeder: Jerry Crawford & Paul Pompa Jr.
- Owner: Donegal Racing
- Trainer: William I. Mott
- Record: 17: 4 - 2 - 1
- Earnings: US$299,406

Awards
- Kentucky Broodmare of the Year (2024)
- Last updated on November 5, 2025

Puca (foaled May 17, 2012) is an American thoroughbred racehorse, who raced from 2014 to 2017 for Donegal Racing. She is out of Boat's Ghost, by the sire Big Brown.

Her success has come as a broodmare, as she has produced three Grade I winners: 2023 Kentucky Derby winner Mage, 2024 Belmont Stakes and Haskell Stakes winner Dornoch, and 2025 Pennsylvania Derby winner Baeza. She is the only horse in history to produce two full siblings to win Triple Crown races, with Mage and Dornoch both sired by 2017 champion juvenile Good Magic. She was named 2024 Kentucky Broodmare of the Year.

Puca won four races in her career, and placed in the Grade II Gazelle Stakes. After her racing career, Puca was sold for $275,000 to bloodstock agent Thomas Clark at the 2017 Keeneland November Breeding Stock Sale. The following year, at The November Sale at Fasig-Tipton, she sold for $475,000 while in foal to Gun Runner. That foal, Gunning, would become a stakes-placed runner. In 2022 she foaled a McKinzie colt, Baeza, who would win the Pennsylvania Derby as a three-year-old. In 2023, the year that Mage won the Kentucky Derby, Puca was sent to that year's November Breeding Stock Sale at Keeneland while in foal to Good Magic. After a final bid of $2.8 million that did not meet the reserve price, she was purchased privately by John Stewart's Resolute Racing for $2.9 million. After that sale, she produced a colt and a filly by Good Magic.

In August 2025, it was reported that Stewart was planning to send Puca to The November Sale at Fasig-Tipton. Stewart told a horse racing podcast that he would set a strong reserve price and it would take "north of $5 million to buy her." On November 3, 2025, the 13-year-old Puca went through the sales ring and sold for $5 million to UK-based Ace Stud Bloodstock, the stallion brand of Yuesheng Zhang's Yulong Investments. Ace Stud manager Paul Curran said that the initial plan was to keep Puca in the United States to support sires Raging Torrent and Carl Spackler, the latter of which had recently retired.

== Offspring ==
Foals by Puca
Name	Sire	Year	Achievements
Gunning, chestnut mare	Gun Runner	2019	stakes placed
Mage, chestnut stallion	Good Magic	2020	Winner of Grade I Kentucky Derby
Dornoch, bay colt	Good Magic	2021	Winner of Grade I Belmont Stakes and Haskell Stakes
Baeza, bay colt	McKinzie	2022	Winner of Grade I Pennsylvania Derby
	Good Magic	2024	
	Good Magic	2025	

== Pedigree ==
Pedigree of Puca (USA), bay mare, May 17, 2012
Sire Big Brown (2005)	Boundary (1990)	Danzig (1977)	Northern Dancer (CAN) (1961)
Sire Big Brown (2005)	Boundary (1990)	Danzig (1977)	Pas de Nom (1968)
Sire Big Brown (2005)	Boundary (1990)	Edge (1978)	Damascus (1964)
Sire Big Brown (2005)	Boundary (1990)	Edge (1978)	Ponte Vecchio (1970)
Sire Big Brown (2005)	Mien (1999)	Nureyev (1977)	Northern Dancer (CAN) (1961)
Sire Big Brown (2005)	Mien (1999)	Nureyev (1977)	Special (1969)
Sire Big Brown (2005)	Mien (1999)	Miasma (1992)	Lear Fan (1961)
Sire Big Brown (2005)	Mien (1999)	Miasma (1992)	Syrian Circle (1979)
Dam Boat's Ghost (2004)	Silver Ghost (1982)	Mr Prospector (1970)	Raise a Native 1961
Dam Boat's Ghost (2004)	Silver Ghost (1982)	Mr Prospector (1970)	Gold Digger 1962
Dam Boat's Ghost (2004)	Silver Ghost (1982)	Misty Gallore (1976)	Halo (1969)
Dam Boat's Ghost (2004)	Silver Ghost (1982)	Misty Gallore (1976)	Flight Dancer (1968)
Dam Boat's Ghost (2004)	Rocktheboat (1996)	Summer Squall (1987)	Storm Bird (CAN) (1978)
Dam Boat's Ghost (2004)	Rocktheboat (1996)	Summer Squall (1987)	Weekend Surprise (1980)
Dam Boat's Ghost (2004)	Rocktheboat (1996)	Native Boat (1989)	Native Royalty (1967)
Dam Boat's Ghost (2004)	Rocktheboat (1996)	Native Boat (1989)	Boat In A Moat (1984)

* Puca is inbred 4S x 4S x 5D to the stallion Northern Dancer (CAN)

* Puca is inbred 4S x 5S to the stallion Damascus

* Puca is inbred 4D x 5D to the stallion Raise a Native
