= Kentucky Broodmare of the Year =

Award given to Thoroughbred broodmares

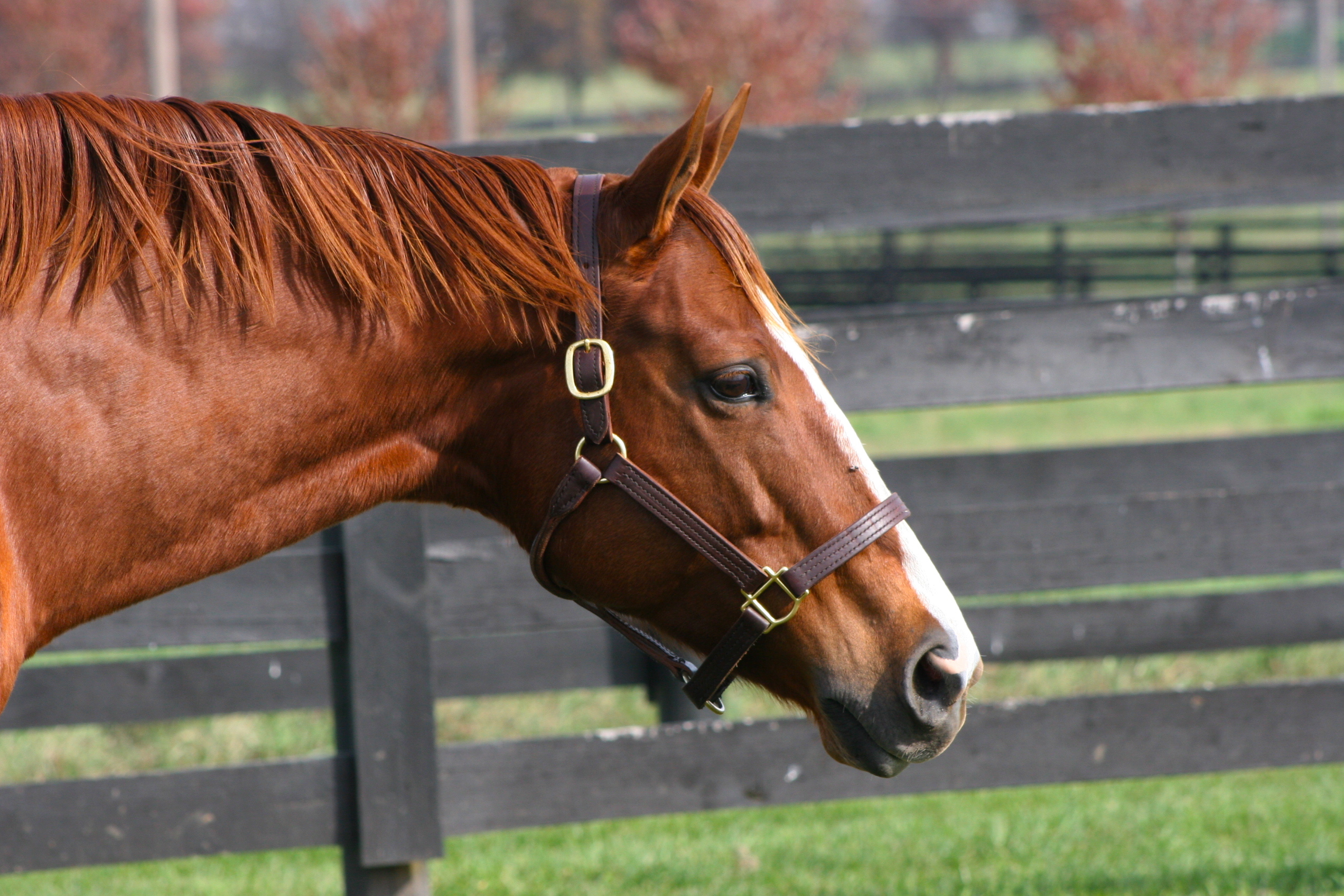
Littleprincessemma, dam of American Pharoah, and Broodmare of the Year in 2015

The Kentucky Broodmare of the Year is selected each year by the Kentucky Thoroughbred Owners and Breeders Association. The title is considered the highest honor an American thoroughbred broodmare can receive, as the majority of American breeding stock resides in Kentucky. It is a subjective vote, as opposed to the title for leading sire in North America that looks strictly at the earnings of the stallion's progeny in the given year.

Currently, a mare is eligible for consideration if one particular offspring, conceived and foaled in Kentucky, won a Grade I stakes race in the award year. Consideration may then also be given to previous foals, specifically the number of stakes winners produced and their earnings. The rules were more relaxed in the past, essentially requiring, as one bloodstock expert observed, only that "the mare be boarded in Kentucky."

Mares who have produced multiple graded stakes winners may also be given the informal title of "blue hen". Toussaud, the 2002 Kentucky Broodmare of the Year, is often referred to as a blue hen for producing four grade 1 winners (Chester House, Honest Lady, Chiselling and Belmont Stakes winner Empire Maker) from her first six foals.

== Winners ==
The winners for each year and their most notable progeny are as follows:

- 1946 - Bloodroot - Ancestor
- 1947 - Potheen - Bewitch
- 1948 - Our Page - Navy Page
- 1949 - Easy Lass - Coaltown
- 1950 - Hildene - Hill Prince, First Landing
- 1951 - Alpenstock III - Ruhe
- 1952 - Ace Card - One Count
- 1953 - Gaga - Tom Fool
- 1954 - Traffic Court - Hasty Road, Traffic Judge
- 1955 - Iron Reward - Swaps
- 1956 - Swoon - Swoon's Son
- 1957 - Belle Jeep - Jewel's Reward
- 1958 - Miss Disco - Bold Ruler
- 1959 - Knight's Daughter - Round Table
- 1960 - Siama - Bald Eagle
- 1961 - Striking - Bases Full, Hitting Away, Batter Up, Glamour
- 1962 - Track Medal - Outing Class
- 1963 - Misty Morn‡ - Bold Lad, Successor
- 1964 - Maid of Flight - Kelso
- 1965 - Pocahontas - Tom Rolfe
- 1966 - Juliet's Nurse - Gallant Romeo
- 1967 - Kerala - Damascus
- 1968 - Delta - Dike
- 1969 - All Beautiful - Arts and Letters
- 1970 - Levee - Shuvee
- 1971 - Iberia - Riva Ridge
- 1972 - Moment of Truth II - Convenience
- 1973 - Somethingroyal - Secretariat, Sir Gaylord
- 1974 - Cosmah - Halo, Tosmah
- 1975 - Shenanigans - Ruffian, Icecapade
- 1976 - Gazala II - Youth
- 1977 - Sweet Tooth - Alydar, Our Mims
- 1978 - Primonetta - Cum Laude Laurie
- 1979 - Smartaire - Quadratic, Smarten
- 1980 - Key Bridge - Fort Marcy, Key to the Mint
- 1981 - Natashka - Truly Bound
- 1982 - Best In Show - Blush With Pride
- 1983 - Courtly Dee - Althea
- 1984 - Hasty Queen II - Fit to Fight
- 1985 - Dunce Cap II - Late Bloomer
- 1986 - Too Bald - Exceller, Capote
- 1987 - Banja Luka - Ferdinand
- 1988 - Grecian Banner - Personal Ensign, Personal Flag
- 1989 - Relaxing‡ - Easy Goer
- 1990 - Kamar - Gorgeous
- 1991 - Toll Booth - Plugged Nickle
- 1992 - Weekend Surprise† - A.P. Indy, Summer Squall
- 1993 - Glowing Tribute - Sea Hero
- 1994 - Fall Aspen - Timber Country
- 1995 - Northern Sunset (IRE) - St Jovite
- 1996 - Personal Ensign‡ - My Flag, Miners Mark, Traditionally
- 1997 - Slightly Dangerous - Warning, Dushyantor
- 1998 - In Neon - Sharp Cat, Royal Anthem
- 1999 - Anne Campbell - Menifee, Desert Wine
- 2000 - Primal Force - Awesome Again, Macho Uno
- 2001 - Turko's Turn - Point Given
- 2002 - Toussaud - Empire Maker, Chester House, Chiselling, Honest Lady
- 2003 - Prospectors Delite - Mineshaft
- 2004 - Dear Birdie - Birdstone, Bird Town
- 2005 - Baby Zip - Ghostzapper, City Zip
- 2006 - Cara Rafaela - Bernardini
- 2007 - Better Than Honour - Rags to Riches, Jazil
- 2008 - Vertigineux - Zenyatta, Balance
- 2009 - Sweet Life - Sweet Catomine, Life Is Sweet
- 2010 - Liable - Blame
- 2011 - Oatsee - Shackleford
- 2012 - Lisa Danielle - Wise Dan, Successful Dan
- 2013 - Take Charge Lady - Will Take Charge, Take Charge Indy
- 2014 - Fun House - Untapable, Paddy O'Prado
- 2015 - Littleprincessemma - American Pharoah
- 2016 - Leslie's Lady - Beholder, Into Mischief, Mendelssohn
- 2017 - Lemons Forever - Forever Unbridled, Unbridled Forever
- 2018 - Stage Magic - Justify
- 2019 - Beyond the Waves – Bricks and Mortar
- 2020 - Drumette - Monomoy Girl, Mr. Monomoy
- 2021 - Indian Miss - Mitole, Hot Rod Charlie
- 2022 - Dreaming Of Julia - Malathaat, Julia Shining
- 2023 - Dance Card - Cody's Wish
- 2024 - Puca† - Mage, Dornoch, Baeza
- 2025 - Crowned - Sovereignty

† produced two American Classic winners
‡ was a Champion during racing career and produced a Champion

Since 2009, the national Thoroughbred Owners and Breeders Association has also named a broodmare of the year. Winners of the national and Kentucky award have largely been the same, with a few exceptions:

- 2017 - Win Approval - World Approval, Miesque's Approval, Za Approval, Revved Up
- 2024 - Sataves - Thorpedo Anna
- 2025 - Puca - Mage, Dornoch, Baeza

== See also ==
- Leading sire in North America
- Leading broodmare sire in North America
