= Puca =

Puca or PUCA may refer to

- Púca, faery creature of Celtic folklore.
- Puka (Peru), also spelled Puca, a mountain in Peru
- Puck (mythology), fairy or mischievous nature sprite in English folklore (possibly related to Púca)
- Florin Pucă (1932–1990), Romanian graphic artist
- Central American Unionist Party (Partido Unionista Centroamericano), center-right Nicaraguan political party
- Diketo (game) or puca, a game similar to Jacks from South Africa
- Puca (horse), American thoroughbred racehorse and broodmare
