= Mage (horse) =

Thoroughbred race horse, winner of the 2023 Kentucky Derby

- Sire: Good Magic
- Grandsire: Curlin
- Dam: Puca
- Damsire: Big Brown
- Sex: Stallion
- Foaled: April 18, 2020 (age 6); Kentucky, U.S.
- Country: United States
- Color: Chestnut
- Breeder: Grandview Equine
- Owner: OGMA Investments, Ramiro Restrepo, Sterling Racing & Commonwealth Thoroughbreds
- Trainer: Gustavo Delgado
- Record: 7: 2–2–1
- Earnings: $2,507,450

Major wins
- American Triple Crown wins: Kentucky Derby (2023)
- Last updated on 26 August 2023

Mage (foaled April 18, 2020) is an American Thoroughbred racehorse who won the 2023 Kentucky Derby.

== Background ==
Mage is a chestnut colt bred in Kentucky by Grandview Equine. His sire Good Magic was the U.S. Champion Two-Year-Old in 2017 after he won the 2017 Breeders' Cup Juvenile as a maiden; in 2018 he finished second in the Kentucky Derby.

His dam, Puca, is a daughter of Big Brown. Mage was initially sold for $235,000 to New Team from the Runnymede Farm consignment at the 2021 Keeneland September Yearling Sale. Mage is the second black-type horse out of his dam's four foals, the other being a stakes-placed Gun Runner filly named Gunning. Mage's full brother Dornoch is also a grade-I stakes winner, having won the 2024 Belmont Stakes. The dam, a stakes-winning half sister to Grade I winner Finnegans Wake, also has colt by McKinzie named Baeza, who finished 3rd in the 2025 Kentucky Derby. Mage is a descendent of Darley Arabian.

He is trained by Gustavo Delgado, a four-time Venezuelan Triple Crown-winning trainer.

Mage is owned by OGMA Investments, Ramiro Restrepo, Sterling Racing and Commonwealth Thoroughbreds. Commonwealth Thoroughbreds is a micro-shares partnership that formed after Restrepo and Delgado acquired the colt above their initial budget from the Sequel Bloodstock consignment at Fasig-Tipton's Midlantic Two-Year-Olds in Training Sale in May 2022, having cost $290,000.

== Career ==
Mage began his career as a three-year-old on January 28, 2023, with a victory in his first start, a Maiden Special Weight event over seven furlongs at Gulfstream Park.

His next start was in the Grade II Fountain of Youth Stakes at Gulfstream Park where he finished fourth by about seven lengths to the 2022 US Champion Two-Year-Old Forte.

Four weeks later, Mage entered the Grade I Florida Derby where he finished second to Forte after leading in the straight, beaten by a length. Trainer Gustavo Delgado indicated, "(Mage) might have gotten tired but remember, it's still his third race. How many races did it take Forte to get to the level he is?" Mage collected 40 qualification points on the 2023 Road to the Kentucky Derby and with his fourth in the Fountain of Youth Stakes qualified to start in the Kentucky Derby.

=== Kentucky Derby ===
Mage broke slowly in the Derby as he did in his previous two close losing efforts. Jockey Javier Castellano allowed his mount to settle toward the back of the field of 18. A fast pace proved to his benefit, with fractions of :22.35, :45.73, and 1:10.11 set by frontrunners Verifying, Kingsbarns, and Reincarnate. Castellano picked his opportunities to advance and had Mage up to sixth by the mile marker. Down the lane, the lightly raced colt caught leader Two Phil's to win by a length in a final time of 2:01.57. At post-time, Mage went off at 15–1 to win. He joins Regret (1915), Big Brown (2008), and Justify (2018) as the only Derby winners who had only three prior starts. Mage, Justify, and Apollo (1882) are the only horses to win the Derby without having raced as two-year-olds.

== Statistics ==
Date	Distance	Race	Grade	Track	Odds	Field	Finish	Winning Time	Winning (Losing) Margin	Jockey	Ref
2023 – Three-year-old season
Jan 28, 2023	7 furlongs	Maiden Special Weight		Gulfstream Park	11.60	8	1	1:22.54	3 3/4 lengths	Edgar Perez	
Mar 4, 2023	1 1/16 miles	Fountain of Youth Stakes	II	Gulfstream Park	5.90	9	4	1:43.12	(6 3/4 lengths)	Javier Castellano	
Apr 1, 2023	1 1/8 miles	Florida Derby	I	Gulfstream Park	4.70	12	2	1:49.37	(1 length)	Luis Saez	
May 6, 2023	1 1/4 miles	Kentucky Derby	I	Churchill Downs	15.21	18	1	2:01.57	1 length	Javier Castellano	
May 20, 2023	1 3/16 miles	Preakness Stakes	I	Pimlico	1.40*	7	3	1:55.12	(2 1/4 lengths)	Javier Castellano	
Jul 22, 2023	1 1/8 miles	Haskell Stakes	I	Monmouth Park	4.30	8	2	1:49.52	(1 3/4 lengths)	Javier Castellano	
Aug 26, 2023	1 1/4 miles	Travers Stakes	I	Saratoga	4.70	7	7	2:02.23	(15 lengths)	Flavien Prat	

Notes:
An (*) asterisk after the odds means Mage was the post-time favourite.

== Stud career ==
Mage was retired at Airdrie Stud for his first breeding season in 2024, having bred 171 mares. In 2025 seasonal breeding, he continued to serve there for a fee of $25,000.

The first foal by Mage, a bay colt out of multiple stakes-placed winner, a City of Light mare Lil Miss Moonlight, was born on January 9 at Machmer Hall in Paris, Kentucky.

== Pedigree ==
Pedigree of Mage (USA), chestnut colt, April 18, 2020
Sire Good Magic (2015)	Curlin (2004)	Smart Strike (CAN) (1992)	Mr Prospector* (1970)
Sire Good Magic (2015)	Curlin (2004)	Smart Strike (CAN) (1992)	Classy 'n Smart (CAN) (1981)
Sire Good Magic (2015)	Curlin (2004)	Sheriff's Deputy (1994)	Deputy Minister (CAN) (1979)
Sire Good Magic (2015)	Curlin (2004)	Sheriff's Deputy (1994)	Barbarika (1985)
Sire Good Magic (2015)	Glinda the Good (2009)	Hard Spun (2004)	Danzig* (1977)
Sire Good Magic (2015)	Glinda the Good (2009)	Hard Spun (2004)	Turkish Tryst (1991)
Sire Good Magic (2015)	Glinda the Good (2009)	Magical Flash (1990)	Miswaki*^ (1978)
Sire Good Magic (2015)	Glinda the Good (2009)	Magical Flash (1990)	Gil's Magic (1983)
Dam Puca (2012)	Big Brown (2005)	Boundary (1990)	Danzig* (1977)
Dam Puca (2012)	Big Brown (2005)	Boundary (1990)	Edge (1978)
Dam Puca (2012)	Big Brown (2005)	Mien (1999)	Nureyev (1977)
Dam Puca (2012)	Big Brown (2005)	Mien (1999)	Miasma (1992)
Dam Puca (2012)	Boat's Ghost (2004)	Silver Ghost (1982)	Mr Prospector* (1970)
Dam Puca (2012)	Boat's Ghost (2004)	Silver Ghost (1982)	Misty Gallore (1976)
Dam Puca (2012)	Boat's Ghost (2004)	Rocktheboat (1996)	Summer Squall (1987)
Dam Puca (2012)	Boat's Ghost (2004)	Rocktheboat (1996)	Native Boat (1989)

*^ Mage is inbred 4S x 5S x 4D to the stallion Mr Prospector, meaning that he appears fourth and fifth generation (via Miswaki)^ on the sire side of his pedigree and fourth generation on the dam side of his pedigree.

* Mage is inbred 4S x 4D to the stallion Danzig, meaning that he appears fourth generation on the sire side of his pedigree and fourth generation on the dam side of his pedigree.
