= Diketo =

Diketo may refer to:

- Diketo (game), a children's game similar to Jacks played in South Africa
- Diketone, a chemical molecule
