= Jayson Werth =

American baseball player (born 1979)

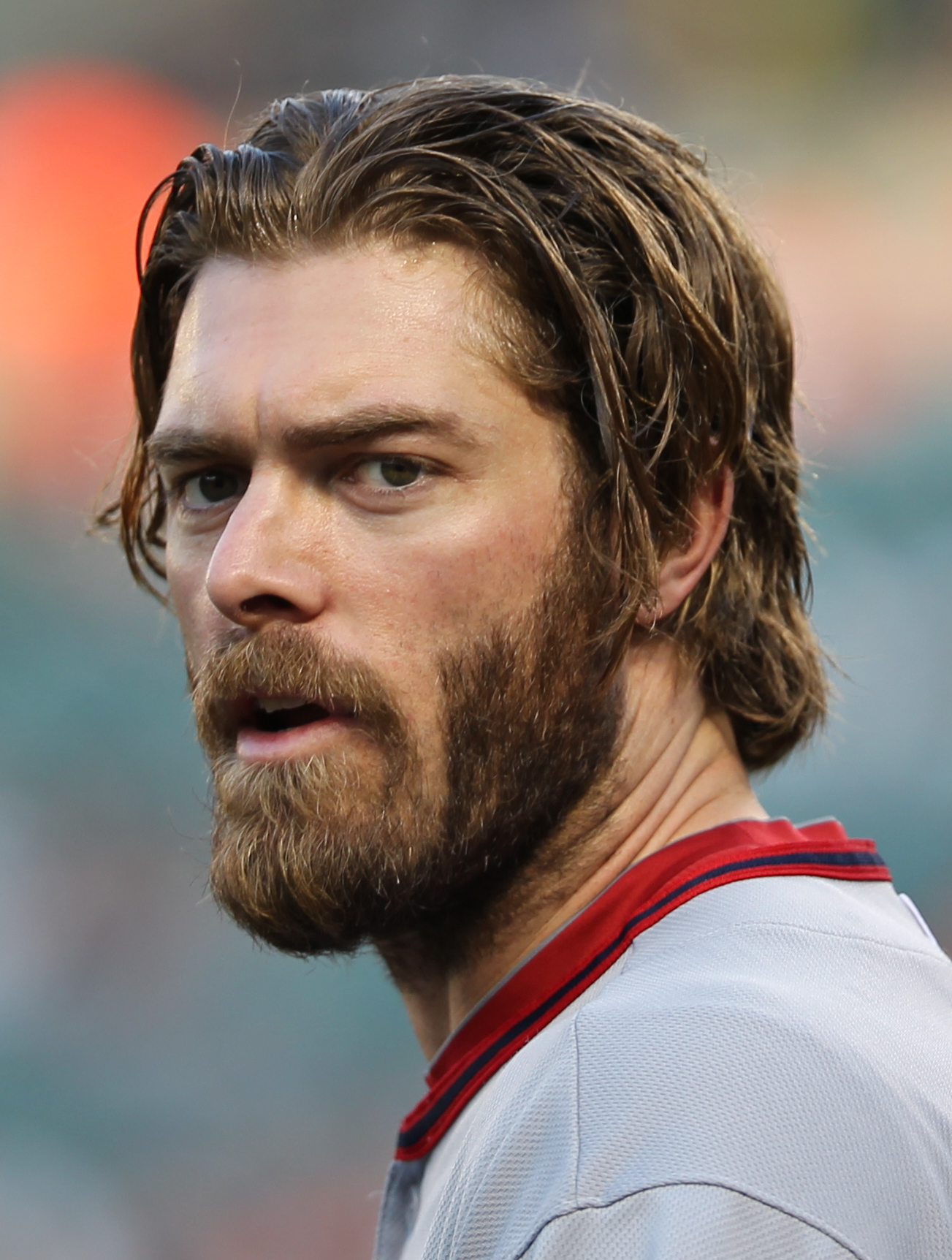
- Werth in 2011
- Outfielder
- Born: May 20, 1979 (age 47); Springfield, Illinois, U.S.
- Batted: Right Threw: Right

MLB debut
- September 1, 2002, for the Toronto Blue Jays

Last MLB appearance
- October 1, 2017, for the Washington Nationals

MLB statistics
- Batting average: .267
- Home runs: 229
- Runs batted in: 799
- Stats at Baseball Reference

Teams
- Toronto Blue Jays (2002–2003); Los Angeles Dodgers (2004–2005); Philadelphia Phillies (2007–2010); Washington Nationals (2011–2017)

Career highlights and awards
- All-Star (2009); World Series champion (2008); Washington Nationals Ring of Honor

Jayson Richard Gowan Werth (born May 20, 1979) is an American former professional baseball outfielder who played in Major League Baseball (MLB) from 2002 to 2017. His 15-season career was split among the Toronto Blue Jays, Los Angeles Dodgers, Philadelphia Phillies, and the Washington Nationals.

Born in Springfield, Illinois, Werth was a third-generation baseball player, as his great-grandfather and grandfather had both played professional baseball, as had his uncle and stepfather. His time catching for Glenwood High School led to an athletic scholarship to play college baseball with the Georgia Bulldogs, which he turned down after the Baltimore Orioles selected him in the 1997 MLB draft. Werth played in the Orioles' farm system until 2001, when he was traded to the Blue Jays as part of a package for John Bale. Werth made his MLB debut with the Blue Jays in 2002, and split time between the majors and minors until he was traded to the Dodgers in 2004.

Werth's tenure with the Dodgers was marked by injury, including a torn ulnotriquetral ligament that kept him out for the entire 2006 season. That winter, he was signed by the Phillies as a free agent bench player. By the end of the 2008 season, however, Werth had become an everyday outfielder for Philadelphia, and he became the latest player in his family to win a World Series championship. The following year, Werth was named to the All-Star Game and appeared in his second consecutive World Series, where he set a franchise postseason record with nine home runs in one postseason run. He was less successful in 2010, however, and the Phillies were eliminated in the 2010 National League Championship Series by the San Francisco Giants.

In December 2010, Werth joined the Nationals on a seven-year, $126 million contract. After his first season with the team was spent in a prolonged slump and his second was limited by a second injury to his left wrist, Werth returned in full in 2013 for one of the best seasons of his career, batting .318 with 25 home runs and 82 runs batted in. The last few seasons of his MLB career were mired in injury: he missed most of the 2015 season after acromioclavicular joint surgery and another wrist fracture, while he missed several months of the 2017 season with a hairline fracture in his foot. Werth signed a minor league contract with the Seattle Mariners in 2018 and played in 36 games for the Triple-A Tacoma Rainiers, but after a stint on the disabled list with a hamstring injury, he elected to retire from baseball.

== Early life ==
Jayson Richard Gowan Werth was born on May 20, 1979, in Springfield, Illinois, into an athletic family. His great-grandfather John Schofield was a shortstop whose foray into Major League Baseball (MLB) was cut short by a leg fracture. Schofield's son Ducky, Werth's grandfather, played in MLB from 1953 to 1971, and helped the Pittsburgh Pirates to win the 1960 World Series. Werth's uncle Dick Schofield was also an MLB shortstop for 14 seasons and won the 1993 World Series with the Toronto Blue Jays. While she did not play softball, Werth's mother Kim Schofield Werth was a track and field star who holds two national records, while his father Jeff Gowan was a former wide receiver for the Illinois State Redbirds football team and played for one season in the St. Louis Cardinals' farm system.

Werth's parents separated shortly after he was born, and he had a limited relationship with his estranged father. In 1984 his mother married Dennis Werth, a first baseman for the New York Yankees and Kansas City Royals, leading Werth to pick up a love of baseball via his stepfather. By the time he was 11, Werth would practice catching in his backyard, with his stepfather using a pitching machine to help Werth block balls. He began playing baseball competitively at the age of seven, and his youth team, the Springfield Flame, finished in third place at the 1993 Sandy Koufax World Series. Two years later, Werth was selected for the US team at the Junior Pan American Games. In his final season playing for Glenwood High School in Chatham, Illinois, Werth batted .652 with 15 home runs, 56 runs batted in (RBI) and 27 stolen bases.

== Professional career ==
=== Draft and minor leagues ===
==== Baltimore Orioles organization (1997–2000) ====
The Baltimore Orioles, the only Major League Baseball (MLB) team to have two first-round selections in the 1997 MLB draft, selected Werth 22nd overall and Darnell McDonald 26th overall. Although he had previously committed to play college baseball for the Georgia Bulldogs on an athletic scholarship, Werth chose to forego his commitment in order to sign with the Orioles for a salary of around $850,000. Although he was immediately productive with the Rookie-level Gulf Coast League (GCL) Orioles, batting .309 with five RBI and a home run through his first 20 professional games, Werth also ran into health issues for the first time in his career, the Florida heat causing recurrent back spasms that sidelined him for half of what should have been his first 40 games. He ultimately appeared in 32 games for the GCL Orioles, batting .295 with one home run and eight RBI in 88 at bats.

Werth began the 1998 season with the Low-A Delmarva Shorebirds, with whom he collected three RBI through his first eight South Atlantic League games. Batting .311 with 20 RBI and 12 stolen bases through the end of May, Werth was one of four Shorebirds selected to attend the South Atlantic All-Star Game in June. In 120 games and 408 at bats for Delmarva, Werth batted .265 with eight home runs and 53 RBI. He also impressed behind the plate, helping to call games for his pitchers and successfully throwing out the only baserunner who attempted to steal on him. When the Shorebirds were eliminated from their respective playoffs on September 1, Werth joined the Double-A Bowie Baysox for the remainder of their season. He appeared in five games there, going 3-for-19 with one RBI.

Leading into the 1999 Minor League Baseball season, Werth quelled rumors that the Orioles were interested in turning him from a catcher into an outfielder, saying, "I played outfield in two games in high school. I don't really know how to play outfield." Instead, he joined the Class A-Advanced Frederick Keys for the start of the season as a catcher. Shortly after participating in the Carolina League All-Star Game in July, Werth received a surprise promotion to Bowie: despite being told that he was likely to spend the entire season in Frederick, an injury to Chip Alley created a spot for Werth in Double-A. At the time, he had been batting .305 through 66 Carolina League games, with three home runs and 30 RBI in 236 at bats. After the promotion, he played an additional 35 games in Double-A, where he batted .373 with one home run and 11 RBI in 121 at bats. Werth was expected to play for the Scottsdale Scorpions in the 1999 Arizona Fall League, but suffered a fractured left wrist in Bowie and was replaced by Tim DeCinces.

With veteran catcher Charles Johnson disillusioned with the Orioles over contract disputes during the 1999–2000 offseason, Baltimore began planning for his replacement in Werth. Rather than prematurely promoting him to Triple-A, farm system director Don Buford decided that Werth would begin the 2000 season in Bowie before making his MLB debut in 2001. Instead, after batting only .231 with 25 RBI in Double-A, he received a surprise demotion back to Frederick on August 9, while Mike Kinkade was promoted to Triple-A and Fernando Lumar took Werth's place in Double-A. Werth was more successful in Frederick, batting .277 with two home runs and 18 RBI in 83 at bats across 24 games.

==== Toronto Blue Jays organization (2001–2002) ====
On December 12, 2000, amidst a series of minor league trades, Werth was sent to the Toronto Blue Jays in exchange for left-handed pitcher John Bale. With his new team, Werth once again opened a season on the disabled list, this time with a foot injury. After 21 games with the Dunedin Blue Jays of the Class A-Advanced Florida State League, during which he batted .200 with two home runs and 14 RBI, Werth was promoted to the Double-A Tennessee Smokies of the Southern League, where, after a successful July in which he batted .350 with 32 RBI, he was named the Topps Double-A Batter of the Month. He played a total of 104 games in Tennessee, batting .285 with 18 home runs and 69 RBI in 369 at bats. While he caught in most of the games he started, Werth also appeared as a first baseman for 28 games.

When he was promoted to the Triple-A Syracuse SkyChiefs for the 2002 season, Werth was moved to the outfield, as Josh Phelps and Kevin Cash had already established themselves as Triple-A catchers. Although he had resisted the change with the Orioles, he accepted it now, both because Cash was "one of the best catchers I've ever seen" and because the outfield was less physically taxing, thus allowing Werth to prolong his career. Werth played in 127 International League games that season, catching in 26 and spending the rest of his time in the outfield. As a batter, he hit .257 with 18 home runs and 82 RBI in 443 at bats.

=== Toronto Blue Jays (2002–2003) ===
On September 1, 2002, Werth, who had been hitting .257 with 18 home runs and 82 RBI in Syracuse, was called up to the Blue Jays for his major league debut. He recorded a hit in his debut, a seventh-inning single off of David Wells of the New York Yankees. Although he packed a catcher's mitt upon his promotion to the majors, Werth's performance through his first 10 games with the Blue Jays, with multiple critical plays in right field, cemented his place as an outfielder. He played in 15 games at the end of the season, 10 in right field, four in left, and one in center. At the plate, Werth batted .261 with six RBI in 46 at bats.

Although Toronto manager Carlos Tosca hoped that Werth would start Opening Day with the Blue Jays in 2003 as a backup outfielder for Frank Catalanotto and Vernon Wells, Werth suffered an injury to a ligament in his left wrist during spring training and had to undergo a rehab assignment with the Low-A Dunedin Blue Jays before rejoining the team. On April 14, he was promoted from Dunedin to the Triple-A Syracuse Chiefs, and he was back in Toronto on April 22. There, he and fellow rookie Orlando Hudson both hit three-run home runs, the first of Werth's career, in a 15–5 rout of the Texas Rangers on May 6. Werth spent most of the season alternating between the major and minor leagues depending on injuries to the Jays' core, but the midseason acquisition of outfielder Bobby Kielty, as well as the presence of rookie Reed Johnson, both made it more difficult for Werth to find a permanent place in Toronto. Werth played in 26 major league games in 2003, mostly in the outfield but with a few appearances as a designated hitter, and batted .208 with two home runs and 10 RBI in 48 at bats. He spent considerably more time in Syracuse, batting .237 with nine home runs and 34 RBI in 64 games and 236 at bats.

=== Los Angeles Dodgers (2004–2006) ===
After completing spring training with the Blue Jays, Werth was traded to the Los Angeles Dodgers on March 31, 2004, in exchange for pitcher Jason Frasor. Werth almost immediately began the season on the disabled list after suffering a strained oblique muscle before the second game of the season. He spent nearly two months there before his activation on June 4. When he returned to the lineup, he made an immediate impact on the Dodgers' offensive performance, hitting a home run in his first game back before carrying a .450 batting average through the month of June. When Juan Encarnacion went on the disabled list with an inflamed shoulder at the start of July, Werth took his place as the everyday right fielder. There, his defensive abilities also attracted attention when Werth slammed into the outfield wall to catch an attempted home run from Jeromy Burnitz. He recovered from the hit and managed to turn a double play, holding the Colorado Rockies at two runs and allowing the Dodgers to eventually take the game 3–2 on a home run from David Ross. Werth played in 89 regular season games that year, batting .262 with 16 home runs and 47 RBI in 290 at bats. Most of these at bats came in the final two months of the season, when Werth was playing through a cracked rib. On October 2, his ninth-inning single set up Steve Finley's game-winning grand slam against the San Francisco Giants, a win that helped the team to clinch the National League (NL) West Division and send them to the playoffs for the first time since 1996. Despite two home runs and three RBI from Werth, the Dodgers lost the 2004 National League Division Series (NLDS) to the St. Louis Cardinals in four games.

On the first day of spring training in 2005, Werth fractured the radius in his left wrist on a pitch from A. J. Burnett; while he hoped that he would be able to return from the disabled list by Opening Day, the Dodgers planned to use Ricky Ledee in Werth's place should his recovery need more time. Ledee received nearly two months of playing time in Werth's place, as Werth did not come off of the disabled list until May 26. He also spent time on the disabled list in August with bursitis in his left knee, and Werth did not feel as if he was able to truly begin the season until mid-August. Despite this additional setback, he was thankful for a second trip to the disabled list, as it afforded him more time to work on his hitting mechanics with coach Tim Wallach. Werth was able to play in 102 games with the Dodgers that year despite his injuries, batting .234 with seven home runs and 43 RBI in 337 at bats.

Werth underwent multiple surgeries during the 2005–06 offseason to repair the injuries that had bothered him throughout the prior season. At the start of November, he underwent a minor surgery to remove the synovial bursa in his inflamed knee, and he was expected to recover in full by spring training. At the end of the month, however, he underwent a ligament repair surgery for his injured wrist, a procedure that came with an expected recovery time of five months and postponed his expected return to full health.

By spring training, Werth was in more pain than he had been before the surgery, which his doctors initially believed was psychosomatic. Dodgers athletic trainer further believed that Werth had attempted to push his recovery time and had aggravated the scar tissue, causing it to inflame and induce further pain. At the end of May, he received a series of cortisone shots and his wrist was placed in a cast to limit further movement and alleviate some of the inflammation. That August, with still no improvement, Werth consulted with another doctor, Richard Berger of the Minnesota Mayo Clinic, who diagnosed him with a split tear of the ulnotriquetral ligament and performed an additional surgery to repair the wrist. He was put back in a cast for six weeks, with the anticipation that he would not play again until spring training in 2007. When asked by reporters for updates on Werth's condition, manager Grady Little initially responded, "Who?" After the season, the Dodgers declined to offer a contract to Werth for 2007, thereby releasing him into free agency in December.

=== Philadelphia Phillies (2007–2010) ===
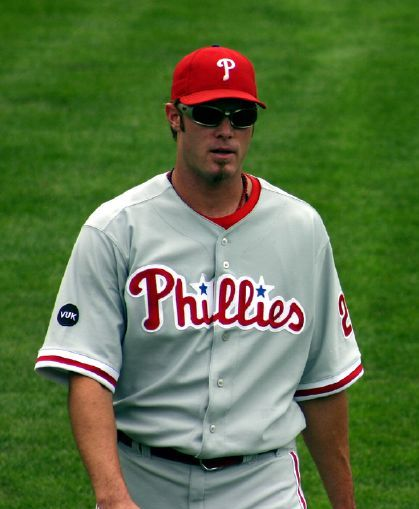
Werth with the Phillies in 2007

On December 20, 2006, the Philadelphia Phillies, who performed a number of physical tests on Werth to confirm that he would remain healthy for the upcoming season, signed the player to a one-year, $850,000 contract, with additional incentives worth up to $1 million. Two days later, the Phillies traded Jeff Conine to the Cincinnati Reds to make room on the roster for Werth as a bench player, filling in for starters Pat Burrell, Aaron Rowand, or Shane Victorino as needed. After pinch running on the 10th-inning game-winning run against the Reds on June 28, Werth was placed back on the disabled list for a wrist injury unrelated to his earlier troubles. He missed all of July before being reactivated on August 1 after injuries to Michael Bourn and Victorino. Shortly after his return, Werth scored the game-winning run in a 5–4 victory over the Atlanta Braves on a seventh-inning error, giving pitcher Cole Hamels his 13th win and pushing the Phillies within three games of winning the NL East.

By the start of September, Werth had become an everyday presence in right field, with a streak of nine hits in as many at bats and a .414 batting average in the month of August. Through August and September, Werth led the Phillies with a .340 batting average and .959 on-base plus slugging (OPS), and his 38 RBI were only one behind Philadelphia leader Ryan Howard. Werth finished the regular season batting .298 with eight home runs and 49 RBI in 94 games and 255 at bats. On October 1, the Phillies clinched the NL East and their first postseason berth in 14 years. When the Phillies faced the Colorado Rockies in the 2007 NLDS, however, manager Charlie Manuel chose to start switch hitter Victorino over Werth to face left-handed pitcher Jeff Francis. The Rockies proceeded to sweep the Phillies in the best-of-five series.

Manuel, who was worried about Werth's batting against right-handed pitchers, decided to open the 2008 season by platooning him with Geoff Jenkins. The system was successful through the first part of the season, with Jenkins and Werth batting a combined .273 with 15 home runs and 44 RBI by June 12. While Manuel expressed interest in making Werth an everyday starter, Burrell and Victorino created immovable positions in the outfield. As the season went on, however, Jenkins was less successful and Werth began to see more playing time. That September, Jenkins was placed on the disabled list and Werth became the everyday right fielder, during which he had a career-high 13-game hitting streak with two home runs and nine RBI. In 134 regular season games, Werth batted .273 with a career-high 24 home runs and 67 RBI. The Phillies once again reached the NLDS in 2008, and Werth hit one of four home runs in Game 4 of the series to beat the Milwaukee Brewers 6–2 and advance to the NL Championship Series (NLCS). Although he went only 4-for-21 in the five-game series, the Phillies defeated Werth's old team, the Dodgers, to reach the 2008 World Series, their first since 1993. There, he batted .444 in five games, including a two-run home run off of Tampa Bay Rays reliever Dan Wheeler in the eighth inning of Game 4, en route to the Phillies' first World Series championship in 28 years. Werth, meanwhile, became the first player in his family to win a World Series ring since Dick Schofield, who was with the Blue Jays in 1993 when they defeated the Phillies.

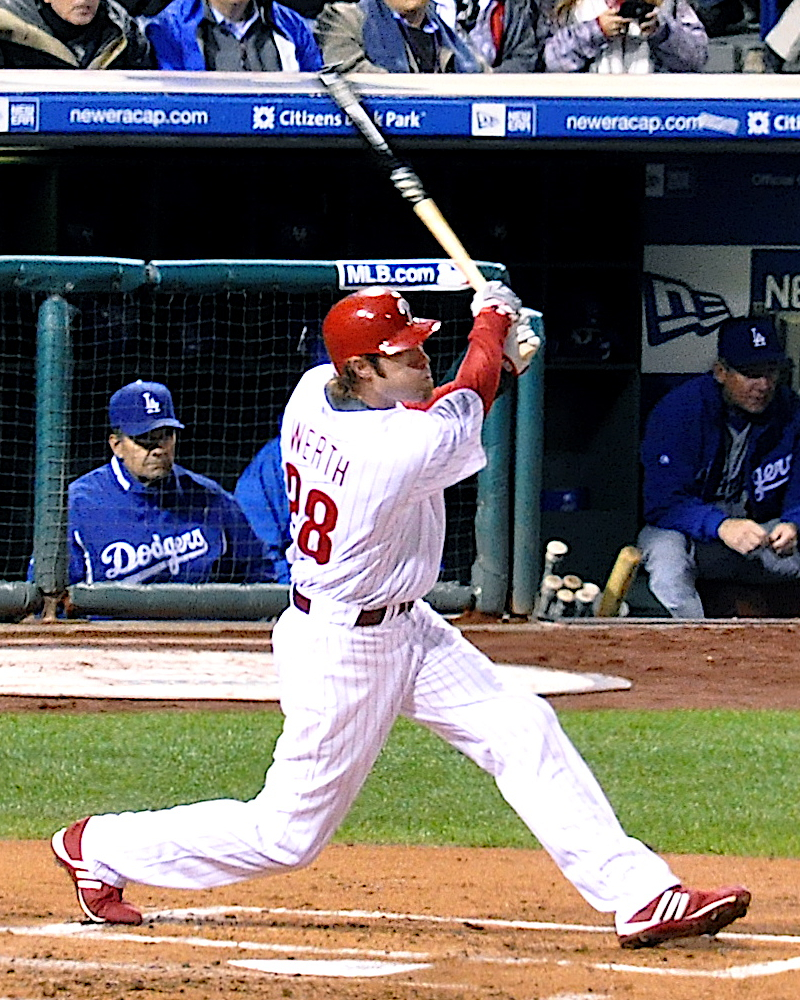
Werth with the Phillies during the 2009 NLCS

On January 22, 2009, the Phillies signed Werth to a two-year, $10 million contract extension. As Burrell had recently become a free agent, the team had an interest in retaining Werth not just as an outfielder but as a right-handed power hitter in a predominantly left-handed lineup. Before the season, the Phillies also released Jenkins, giving Werth a full-time role in right field and batting fifth in the lineup. While facing the Dodgers on May 12, Werth became the ninth player in MLB history to steal second base, third base, and home plate in the span of one inning, finalizing the cycle as Russell Martin was throwing the ball back to Ronald Belisario. The following month, Werth came one triple away from hitting for the cycle, with a single, double, and two home runs against the Blue Jays, including one home run into the upper tier of the Rogers Centre. Despite rumors that Matt Kemp would replace an injured Carlos Beltrán at the 2009 Major League Baseball All-Star Game, Werth instead filled that position in the NL outfield. With Victorino and Raúl Ibañez already slated to appear, the entire Phillies starting outfield was represented at the game. Although Werth was only batting .268 at the time compared to Kemp's .319, his 20 home runs, 54 RBI, and .894 OPS were all higher than his opponent's. On July 21, shortly after the All-Star break, Werth hit the first walk-off home run of his career in the bottom of the 13th inning to defeat the Cubs 5–1 and extend the Phillies' winning streak to 10 games. The Phillies clinched a playoff berth for the third consecutive season, while Werth batted .268 and set career highs with 36 home runs, 99 RBI, 26 doubles, 91 walks, and 153 hits.

Facing the Rockies once more in the 2009 NLDS, Werth made an early impression with a home run and a triple through Games 1 and 2, as well as a massive throw from right field to third base to stop Yorvit Torrealba. His RBI single in Game 4 brought Ryan Howard home and gave the Phillies the deciding run in a 5–4 victory to take them to the 2009 NLCS. Facing the Dodgers again there, Werth hit two home runs in Game 5 to take the Phillies to their second consecutive World Series appearance. Although his first-inning home run was the one that put Philadelphia ahead for the rest of the game, his seventh-inning blast pushed Werth to seven home runs in one postseason, a franchise record. Werth continued to hit in the world series, with a two-home run Game 3 against New York Yankees starter Andy Pettitte, but the Phillies lost the series in six games.

Entering the final year of his contract with the Phillies, a strong performance from Werth in 2010 had the potential to lead to an expensive long-term contract the following season. After starting the year on a hot streak, batting .327 with none home runs and leading MLB with 22 doubles through his first 44 games, Werth then failed to reach base in his next five, striking out in 10 out of 17 at bats and taking a few days off to focus on adjusting his swing. The slump extended well into July. Between May 21 and July 20, he batted only .236 with 55 strikeouts in 48 games, while the Phillies had a 22–29 record in that same time frame. Werth also came under fire during this period when, on July 8, he yelled at a fan who caught a foul ball in the stands that Werth wanted to catch to end the inning. He apologized for the incident, which he said occurred "in the heat of the moment". Werth then broke his 29-game home run drought on July 28 against Rodrigo López of the Arizona Diamondbacks, and in the last 13 games before the Phillies clinched their postseason berth, he batted .354 with six home runs and 17 RBI. For the season overall, Werth was second on the Phillies with a .296 average, 27 home runs, and 85 RBI; best on the team with 106 runs scored, a .388 OBP, and a .532 slugging percentage; and he led the entire NL with 46 doubles.

The Phillies swept the Reds in the 2010 NLDS, but Werth went only 2-for-12 at the plate. That changed during the NLCS, when Werth's 13th career postseason home run both set an NL record and helped lead the Phillies to a 4–2 victory over the San Francisco Giants in Game 5. The Giants would eliminate the Phillies in the next game, however, preventing Werth from reaching a third consecutive World Series. That December, Werth declined the Phillies' salary arbitration offer, officially becoming a free agent.

=== Washington Nationals (2011–2017) ===
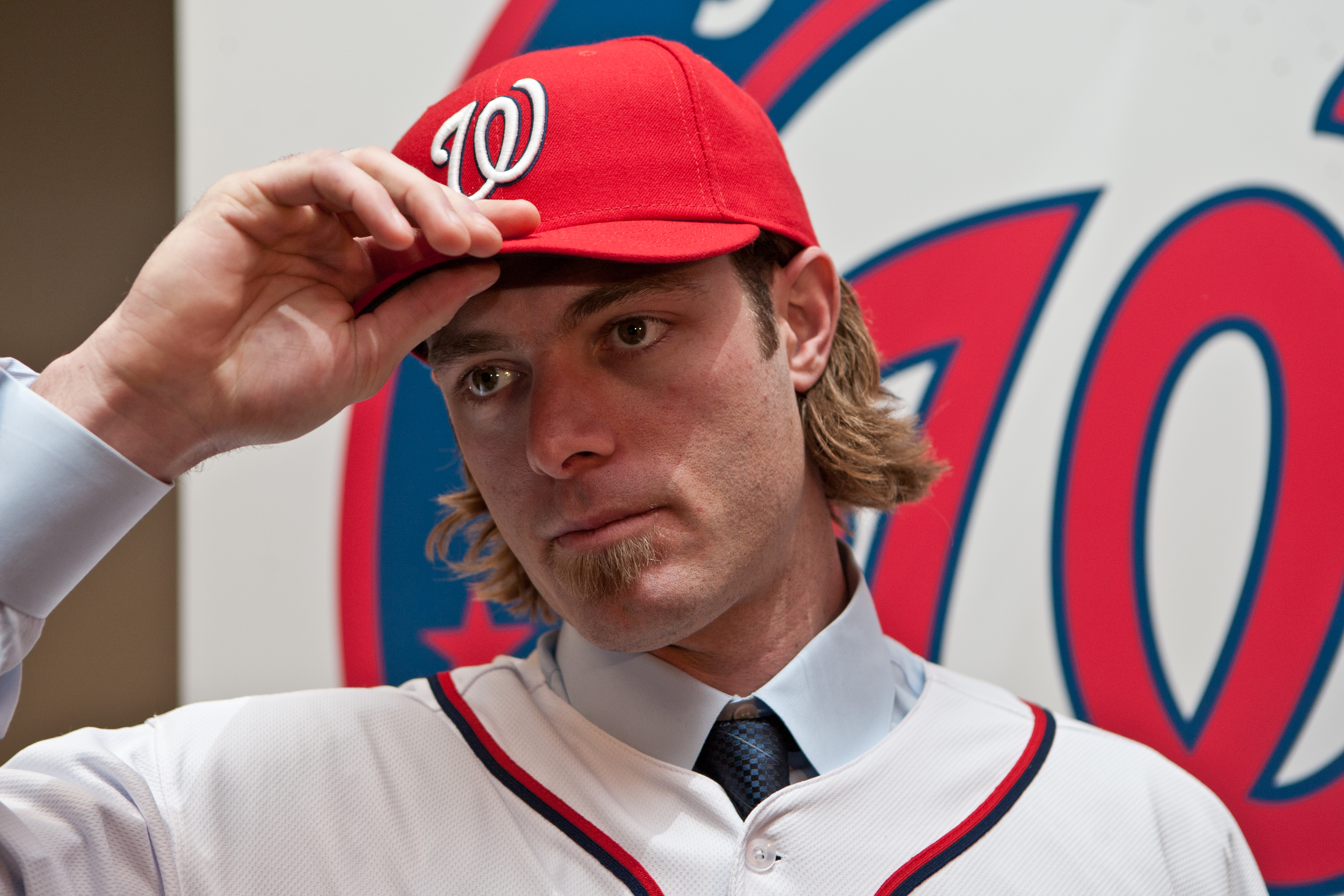
Werth at his introductory press conference after signing a contract with the Nationals

The Washington Nationals, who had lost Adam Dunn to the Chicago White Sox two days prior, signed Werth to a seven-year, $126 million contract on December 5, 2010, the 12th-most expensive contract among active major league players at the time and the 14th-highest in MLB history. The Werth signing was somewhat overshadowed in Philadelphia by the Phillies' own blockbuster offseason acquisition, the return of pitcher Cliff Lee.

Werth returned to Citizens Bank Park for the first time since joining his new team on May 3, 2011. Upon his introduction, he was first booed by Phillies fans before receiving a standing ovation. By late May, Werth's contract was under scrutiny from Nationals fans and sportswriters, as he was batting only .254 (.205 with runners in scoring position) on a team with a 21–28 record. He dismissed allegations of a slump, telling reporters that he was attempting to play through nagging shoulder and knee injuries and that he was consistently a stronger batter after the All-Star break. Shortly after he was booed by Nationals fans and after a local bar introduced discounted beer based on his batting average, Werth broke his 105 at bat homerless streak with a blast against Brett Myers of the Houston Astros on July 20. He was able to improve by the second half of the season, with seven home runs and 20 RBI from mid-July through August, and he finished the season batting .232 with 20 home runs and 58 RBI in 150 games and 561 at bats.

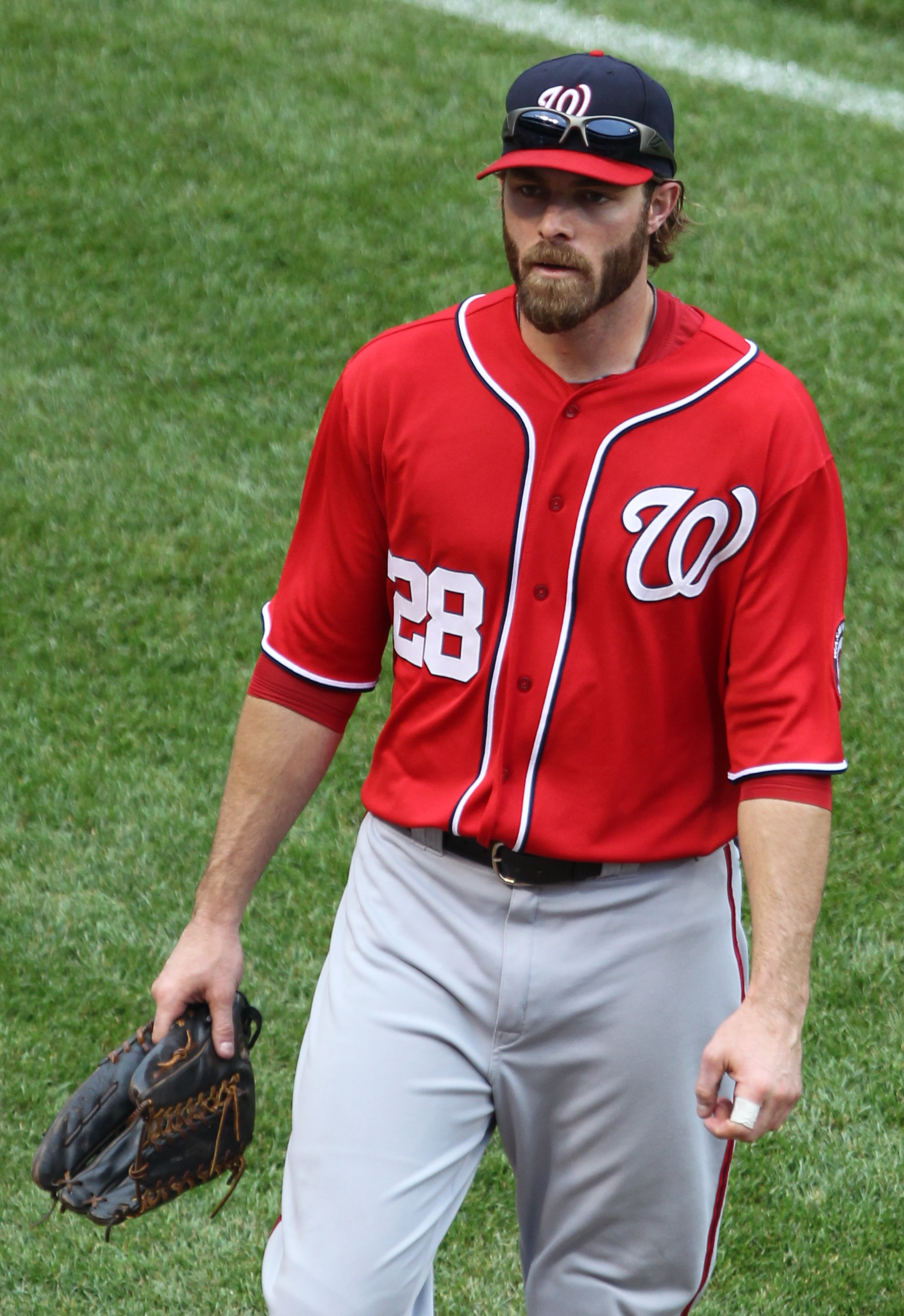
Werth with the Nationals in 2011

Werth opened the 2012 season eager to put the previous year behind him and start new, batting in the middle of the lineup and playing in right field. On May 6, however, Werth fractured his left wrist for the second time while attempting to field a hit from Placido Polanco. Manager Davey Johnson referred to the fracture as a "clean break", but noted that Werth would be out indefinitely. Werth returned to the lineup on August 2 for a shutout victory against the Phillies. After his return, Werth, who referred to himself as a "five-hole hitter" throughout most of his career, was moved to the leadoff spot for the first time, replacing Steve Lombardozzi Jr. in the role. The transition proved successful, as Werth hit .303 with 12 RBI in his 37 games as a leadoff hitter. Appearing in only 81 games due to injury, Werth batted .300 in 2012, with five home runs and 31 RBI in 300 at bats. In Game 4 of the 2012 NLDS, Werth battled Lance Lynn through a 13-pitch at bat before hitting a walk-off home run kept the Nationals from elimination. Although the endpoint of Werth's home run was commemorated by a red seat at Nationals Park, the Cardinals came back from a 6-0 deficit to win Game 5 by the score 9-7 and take the series from Washington.

Werth spent the first half of the 2013 season playing through a number of injuries. He was sidelined for 28 games with a right hamstring strain, left a game in June with a groin strain, and played through multiple illnesses. He broke through these difficulties for one of the strongest months of his career in July, holding a .375/.402/.636 slash line even as the Nationals were registering only 3.74 runs per game. After leading the NL with 24 RBI, 11 doubles, and 17 extra-base hits, Werth was named July's NL Player of the Month, his first time receiving the award. Ten days later, Werth recorded his 1,000th career hit, a two-run home run against Zach Miner of the Phillies. He continued this surge through the end of the year, batting .318 with 25 home runs and 82 RBI, while his career-best .931 OPS was also the second-highest single-season OPS in Nationals history, behind Nick Johnson's .948 in 2006.

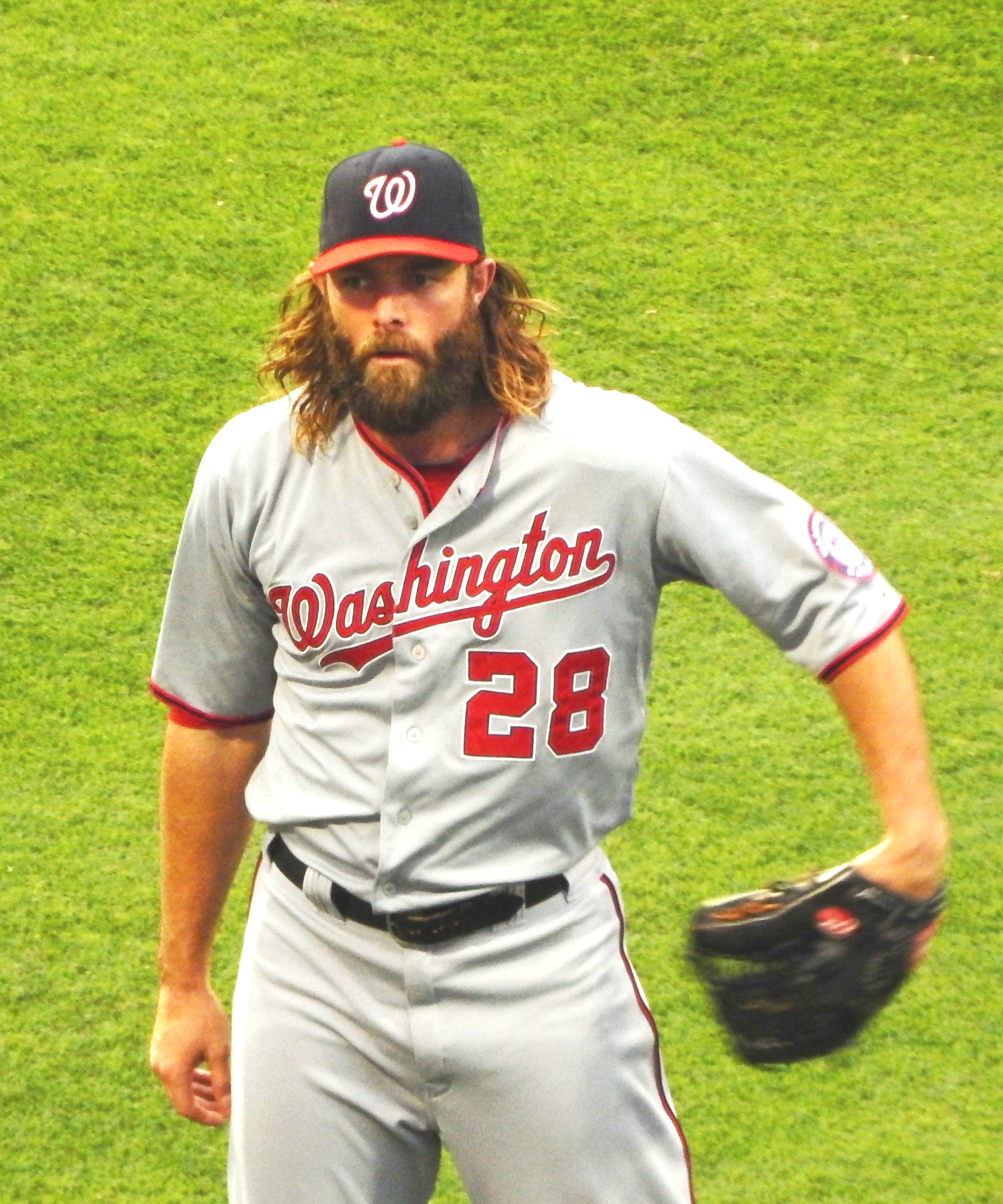
Werth with the Nationals in 2014

In the first month of the 2014 season, Werth led MLB with a 1.756 win probability added, a statistic measured by his 0.476 average in high-leverage situations, such as an eighth-inning grand slam against Marlins pitcher Carlos Marmol. After a slump in June, Werth made a small adjustment to his batting stance, straightening his posture and leading to a July where he batted .337 with 11 doubles, six home runs, and an NL-leading 24 RBI. This adjustment earned Werth the NL Player of the Month Award for July. He missed a handful of games in August with a shoulder sprain, but carried a 27-game on base streak through the start of September. Werth finished the regular season with a .292 batting average, 16 home runs, and 82 RBI in 534 at bats across 147 games. He was unable to carry that momentum into the NLDS, going only 1-for-17 with three walks and five strikeouts as the Nationals fell to the Giants in four games.

Werth's 2015 season was punctuated by injuries. That January, he underwent surgery on his right shoulder to remove a necrotic bone and repair his acromioclavicular joint, with the expectation that he would start playing close to the beginning of the season. Upon his return, the Nationals moved Werth to left field in order to put the younger, healthy Bryce Harper in right. He returned to the lineup on April 13, but fractured his left wrist in two places after being hit by a pitch on May 15. He was able to return on July 28, to mixed results: 15 games into his return, Werth was batting .151 and was making weaker contact with pitches, even though he believed that his wrist was strong. Injury limited Werth to only 88 games in 2015, during which his .221 batting average, 51 hits, and .302 on-base percentage were the lowest of his career since 2004.

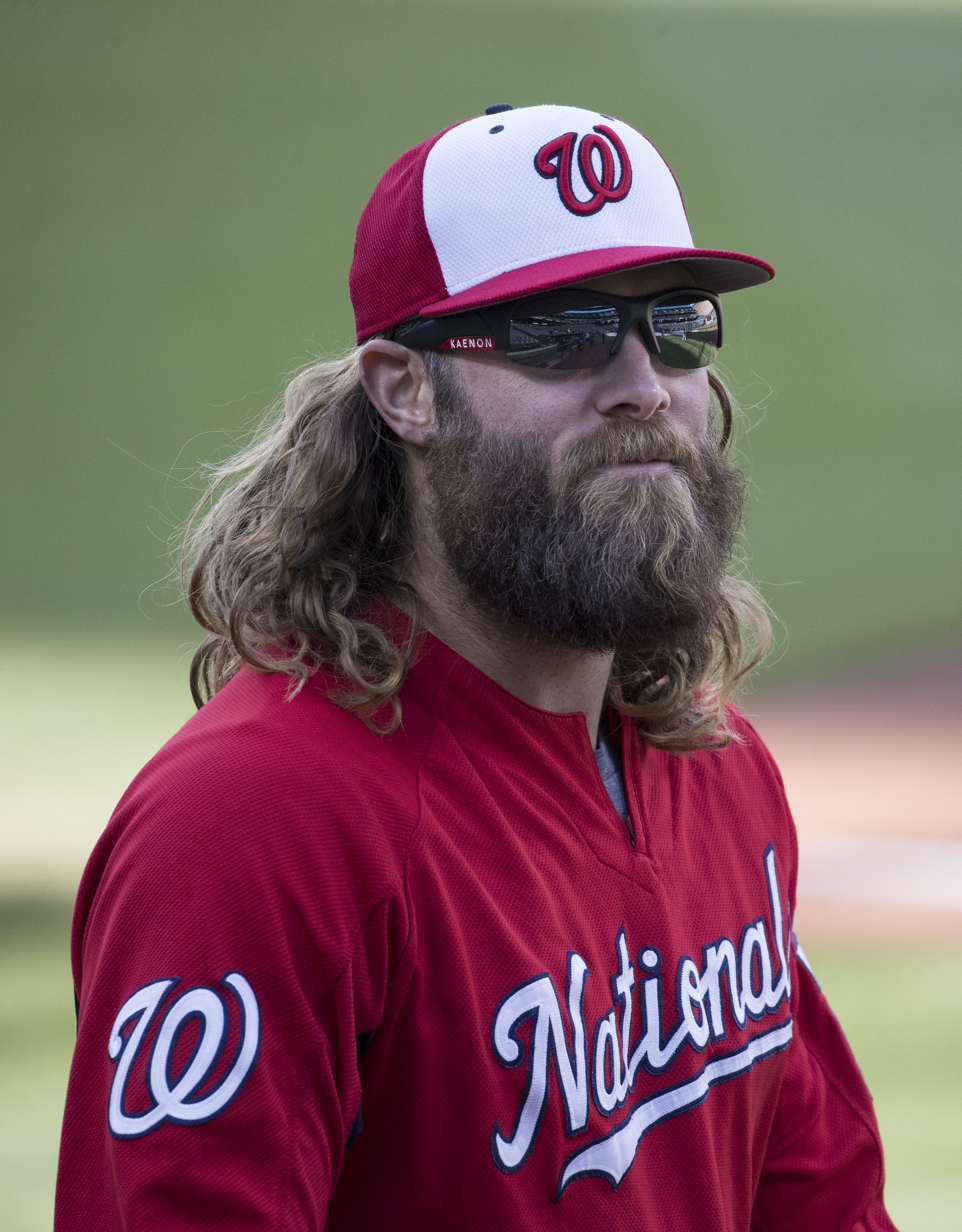
Werth with the Nationals in 2017

Amidst an inconsistent start to the 2016 season, where Werth had 15 hits but 22 strikeouts in his first 71 plate appearances, he hit his 200th career home run on April 19, which collided with a celebratory home run structure past the center field wall at Marlins Park. Still frustrated with his swing by mid-May, Werth spent most of a game against the Cardinals practicing in the batting cages, but he came off the bench for a pinch-hit grand slam, the second in Nationals history, en route to a 10–2 victory. That June, he provided two walk-off hits in the span of a week; after the second, he told those who had been criticizing him to "kiss [his] ass". From June 20 to August 20, Werth carried an on-base streak through 46 games, tying Rusty Staub's franchise record, before he went 0-for-4 against the Atlanta Braves. In 143 games, Werth batted .244 with 21 home runs and 69 RBI across 525 at bats. The Nationals faced the Dodgers in the 2016 NLDS, where Werth hit his 15th career postseason home run in Game 3, tying Babe Ruth for 11th-most in MLB history. Despite this, the Dodgers defeated the Nationals in five games to eliminate them from the postseason.

Although he was older than many of his teammates, having turned 38 at the start of the 2017 MLB season, Werth remained an everyday outfielder for the Nationals, batting .262 and diving for outfield balls through the first 47 games of the season before he was sidelined in a walking boot at the start of June. Originally, it was believed that Werth had only suffered a bone bruise, but six weeks after the injury, he revealed that he had actually suffered a "pretty decent fracture" in his left foot, which had already been affected by a hairline fracture from a foul ball during spring training. After a series of minor league rehab assignments, Werth finally rejoined the Nationals roster on August 28. Batting .226 in 70 games, with 10 home runs and 29 RBI in his final major league season, Werth received a standing ovation from fans for his last regular season game at Nationals Park. He recorded two hits and two walks in Game 5 of the NLDS, but the Chicago Cubs defeated the Nationals 9–8 to advance to the NLCS.

=== Seattle Mariners organization (2018) ===
On March 27, 2018, the Seattle Mariners offered Werth a minor league contract as an "opportunity to extend his career" with the Triple-A Tacoma Rainiers. His stepfather had previously played for the team when they were the Tacoma Yankees in 1978. Werth played in 36 games for Tacoma, hitting .206 with four home runs and 11 doubles as a left fielder and designated hitter. In late May, the Mariners considered promoting Werth in place of an injured Mitch Haniger, but concerns about Werth's health, particularly his hamstring injury, had the team chose John Andreoli instead. The hamstring then forced Werth onto the disabled list on June 9.

=== Retirement ===
Werth knew, after the last hamstring injury with Tacoma, that he was likely finished in professional baseball, and he announced his retirement from the sport on June 28, 2018. While recovering from the injury, Werth came to the realization that he preferred being at home with his family to playing in Triple-A, and that if he suffered a more serious injury upon his return, it would affect his post-retirement career. In 15 seasons with MLB, Werth finished his career batting .267 with a .816 OPS, 229 home runs, 799 RBI, and 132 stolen bases. At the time of his retirement, Werth's 85.161 stolen base percentage was the fifth-highest in MLB history. At a tribute night on September 8, 2018, the Nationals added Werth to the team Ring of Honor at Nationals Park and allowed him to throw out the ceremonial first pitch, which was caught by his son.

After his retirement, Werth began working as an organic farmer in Illinois. He initially purchased a 300 acres (120 ha) plot of land in Macoupin County during his MLB career, but "moved more from a management role into ... a hands-on role" after retiring. He has also become a consultant for other farmers interested in organic processes. Werth also started Two Eight Racing, a horse racing stable that he described as part of an effort "to fill the competitive void baseball once did" for him. Werth's first high profile horse was Dornoch, whom his stable owns a 10% share in and ran in the 2024 Kentucky Derby; Dornoch won the 2024 Belmont Stakes. Werth's horse Flying Mohawk raced in the 2025 Kentucky Derby, finishing eighteenth.

== Personal life ==
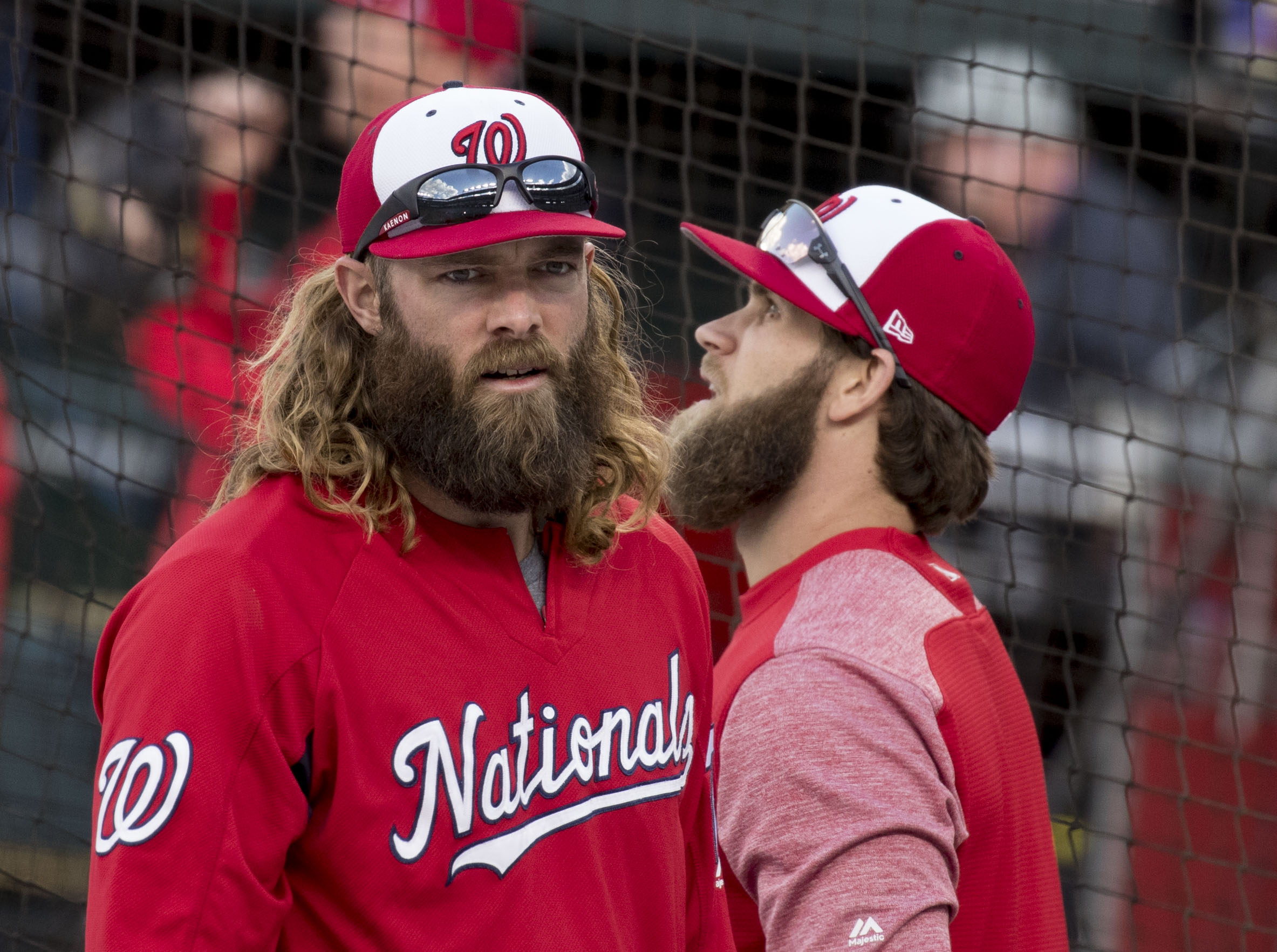
Werth and his teammate Bryce Harper (right) have been close friends since they both played in Washington.

Werth began dating his wife Julia when they were in high school. They were married on January 8, 2000. Their oldest son, Jackson, played college baseball for the Belmont Bruins. In 2004, the Werths filed a libel and slander lawsuit against their mutual high school classmate and Julia's ex-boyfriend, who alleged that Werth had been engaged in a number of adulterous relationships, including one resulting in a child.

During his tenure with Washington, Werth owned a home in McLean, Virginia but put it up for sale in 2019.

Werth's tenure with the Nationals was defined in part by his distinctive long hair and beard, which he began growing out as a superstition against injury. Both his 2005 and 2015 wrist injuries occurred in the game after he received a haircut, and Werth used the experience as evidence not to cut his hair. In 2015, the Nationals held a promotional event where fans received a Chia Pet in Werth's image, with chia growing out into a hair and beard.

As a member of the Nationals, Werth has intermittently interacted with US politicians. He once attempted to ask Ben Bernanke, then the Chair of the Federal Reserve, about a quantitative easing program, but said that Bernanke "wasn't talking about that economic stuff. So we talked about baseball, and it was a hoot." In 2017, he delivered a speech for the Organic Trade Association about his own difficulties in obtaining organic farming certifications and advocating in favor of offering more help for farmers seeking to become organic. A self-identified political moderate, Werth was invited to President Donald Trump's 2018 State of the Union Address as a guest of Rep. Rodney Davis. Two years later, Werth was one of several members of the Nationals to be spotted playing golf with Trump in Florida.

During his tenure with the Nationals, Werth maintained a close friendship with Bryce Harper, who debuted with the team in 2012. When Harper was a rookie, Werth was intentionally tough on the young player, but also served as a mentor figure. Before Harper signed with the Phillies in 2019, he asked for Werth's advice on his old team. Although, as a non-member of the Church of Jesus Christ of Latter-day Saints, Werth was not allowed in attendance at Harper's 2016 wedding, he and mutual teammate Trea Turner attended the postnuptial celebrations.

Werth has had a number of legal incidents related to driving. In 2015, he pled guilty on a reckless driving charge after going 105 mph (169 km/h) in an area where the speed limit was 55 mph (89 km/h). He was sentenced to five days in jail, and his driver's license was suspended for 30 days. In 2018, he was charged with driving under the influence and driving without registration, although the latter charge was dropped. He pled guilty again and was ordered to attend a diversion program and drug and alcohol screening, pay $1,600 in fines and fees, and his driver's license was suspended.

== In popular culture ==
In the American Dad! episode Kiss Cam, Cam Cam, Werth is mentioned by Stan as he and Francine are watching a Nationals game, saying he has "ass for days".

== See also ==
- Third-generation Major League Baseball families
