= Dornoch (horse) =

Thoroughbred race horse, winner of the 2024 Belmont Stakes

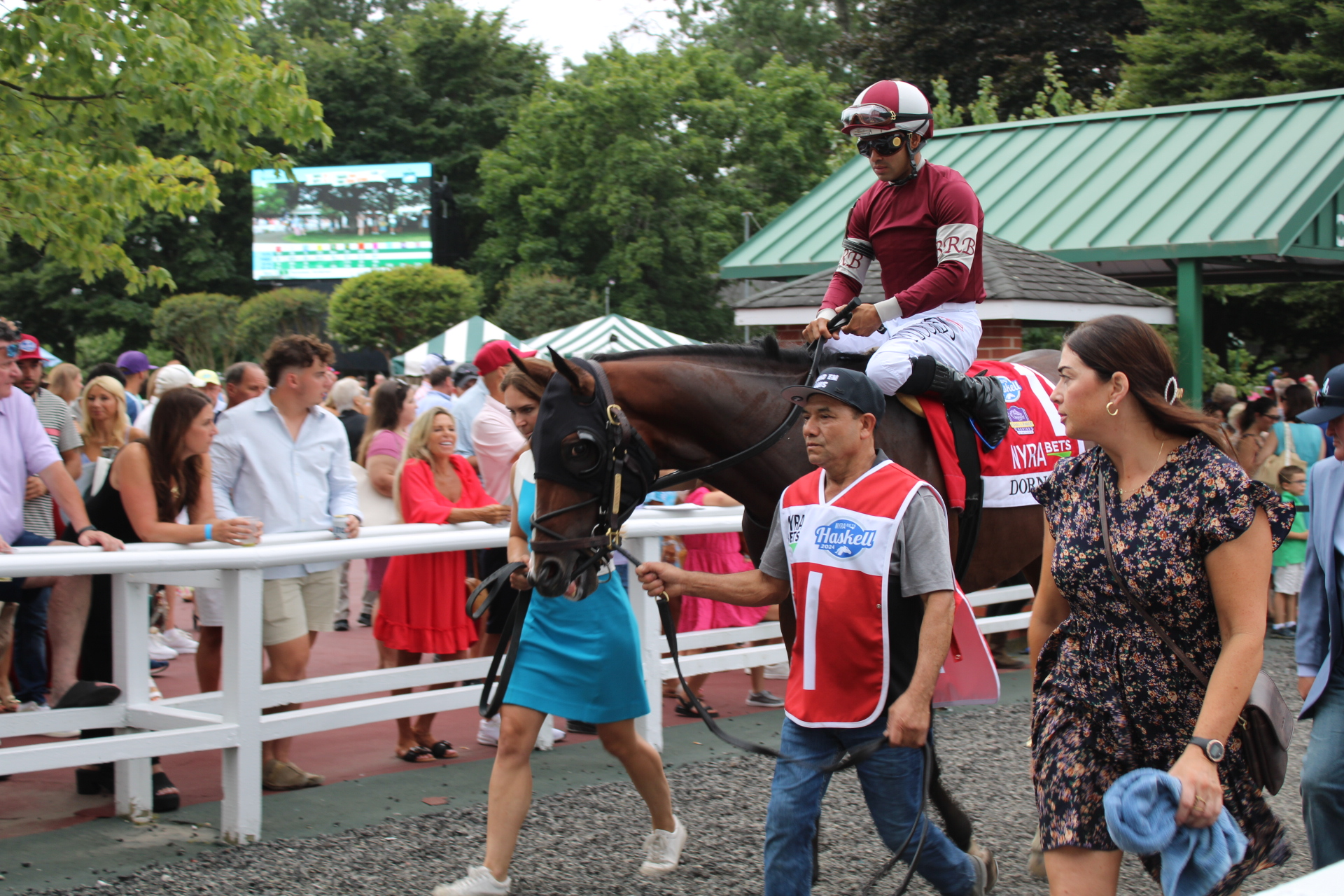
- Sire: Good Magic
- Grandsire: Curlin
- Dam: Puca
- Damsire: Big Brown
- Sex: Stallion
- Foaled: April 22, 2021 (age 5); Kentucky, U.S.
- Country: United States
- Color: Bay
- Breeder: Grandview Equine
- Owner: West Paces Racing, R. A. Hill Stable, Belmar Racing and Breeding, Two Eight Racing & Pine Racing Stables
- Trainer: Danny Gargan
- Record: 10: 5–2–0
- Earnings: $2,427,275

Major wins
- Remsen Stakes (2023); Fountain of Youth Stakes (2024); Haskell Stakes (2024); American Triple Crown wins: Belmont Stakes (2024)
- Last updated on 25 August 2024

Dornoch (foaled April 22, 2021) is a retired multiple-Grade one winning American Thoroughbred racehorse who won the 2024 Belmont Stakes and Haskell Stakes.

== Background ==
Dornoch is a bay stallion bred in Kentucky by Grandview Equine. His sire Good Magic was the U.S. Champion Two-Year-Old in 2017 after he won the 2017 Breeders' Cup Juvenile as a maiden; in 2018 he finished second in the Kentucky Derby. Good Magic, in 2024 stands for $125,000 at Hill 'n' Dale Farms in Paris, Kentucky.

His dam, Puca, is a Grade 2-placed stakes-winning daughter of Big Brown. Breeders Grandview, with the help of Alex Solis II and Jason Litt, went to $475,000 for Puca at The November Sale in 2018, Fasig-Tipton Kentucky's boutique fall mixed sale where she was consigned by Denali Stud. Puca's offspring include 2023 Kentucky Derby winner Mage.

Dornoch was bought by the Oracle Bloodstock agent as a yearling at the Keeneland September Sales for US$325,000.

Former Major League Baseball player Jayson Werth's Two Eight Racing Stable is a co-owner of Dornoch.

== Racing career ==
After finishing second in his first two starts at Saratoga Race Course and Monmouth Park, Dornoch broke his maiden on October 14, 2023, at Keeneland. He then went to Aqueduct Racetrack and won the Grade 2 Remsen Stakes by a nose over Sierra Leone.

In 2024 Dornoch began his three-year-old campaign winning the Grade 2 Fountain of Youth Stakes. He then finished fourth in the Blue Grass Stakes and tenth in the 2024 Kentucky Derby.

Dornoch was then pointed to the Grade 1 Belmont Stakes, which in 2024 was relocated to Saratoga and run at 1 1/4 miles instead of the usual 1 1/2 miles because of construction at Belmont Park. Sent off at 17-1 odds, Dornoch stalked Preakness Stakes winner Seize the Grey before being sent to the lead by jockey Luis Saez. The Todd Pletcher-trained Mindframe challenged entering the stretch, briefly passing Dornoch. As Mindframe drifted in the stretch, Dornoch regained the lead and went on to win by a half length. After the race, Jayson Werth of Two Eight Racing Stable commented about winning the race, saying that it was "the same emotions you feel when you play a playoff game, when you win a World Series game and arguably when you win a World Series."

Dornoch was then shipped to Monmouth Park to contest their signature race, the Haskell Stakes. Despite his credentials, Dornoch was the third betting choice while Mindframe was sent off as the 4-5 favorite. Dornoch was sent to the lead and contested with second choice Timberlake on the far turn. Dornoch eventually turned back Timberlake and held off Mindframe, who had stumbled at the start, to win the Haskell by 1 1/4 lengths. Following the race, co-owner Randy Hill said that Dornoch would stand at Spendthrift Farm upon his retirement.

== Retirement ==
Dornoch was retired to stud in 2025 at Spendthrift Farm after he was diagnosed with bone bruising.

== Statistics ==
Date	Distance	Race	Grade	Track	Odds	Field	Finish	Winning Time	Winning (Losing) Margin	Jockey	Ref
2023 – Two-year-old season
Jul 29, 2023	6 1/2 furlongs	Maiden Special Weight		Saratoga	2.60	10	2	1:17.95	(1 3/4 lengths)	Luis Saez	
Aug 26, 2023	1 mile	Sapling Stakes	Listed	Monmouth Park	1.50*	9	2	1:38.91	(1 length)	Kendrick Carmouche	
Oct 14, 2023	1 1/16 miles	Maiden Special Weight		Keeneland	0.56*	9	1	1:45.00	6 1/4 lengths	Luis Saez	
Dec 2, 2023	1 1/8 miles	Remsen Stakes	II	Aqueduct	1.70*	10	1	1:50.30	nose	Luis Saez	
2024 – Three-year-old season
Mar 2, 2024	1 1/16 miles	Fountain of Youth Stakes	II	Gulfstream Park	0.20*	5	1	1:43.64	1 3/4 lengths	Luis Saez	
Apr 6, 2024	1 1/8 miles	Blue Grass Stakes	I	Keeneland	2.64	10	4	1:50.08	(6 1/2 lengths)	Luis Saez	
May 4, 2024	1 1/4 miles	Kentucky Derby	I	Churchill Downs	22.91	20	10	2:03.34	(18 lengths)	Luis Saez	
Jun 8, 2024	1 1/4 miles	Belmont Stakes	I	Saratoga	17.70	10	1	2:01.64	1/2 length	Luis Saez	
Jul 20, 2024	1 1/8 miles	Haskell Stakes	I	Monmouth Park	3.40	7	1	1:50.31	1 1/4 lengths	Luis Saez	
Aug 24, 2024	1 1/4 miles	Travers Stakes	I	Saratoga	4.60	8	4	2:01.79	(8 1/4 lengths)	Luis Saez	

Notes:
An (*) asterisk after the odds means Dornoch was the post-time favourite.

== Pedigree ==
Pedigree of Dornoch (USA), bay colt, April 22, 2021
Sire Good Magic (2015)	Curlin (2004)	Smart Strike (CAN) (1992)	Mr Prospector* (1970)
Sire Good Magic (2015)	Curlin (2004)	Smart Strike (CAN) (1992)	Classy 'n Smart (CAN) (1981)
Sire Good Magic (2015)	Curlin (2004)	Sheriff's Deputy (1994)	Deputy Minister (CAN) (1979)
Sire Good Magic (2015)	Curlin (2004)	Sheriff's Deputy (1994)	Barbarika (1985)
Sire Good Magic (2015)	Glinda the Good (2009)	Hard Spun (2004)	Danzig* (1977)
Sire Good Magic (2015)	Glinda the Good (2009)	Hard Spun (2004)	Turkish Tryst (1991)
Sire Good Magic (2015)	Glinda the Good (2009)	Magical Flash (1990)	Miswaki*^ (1978)
Sire Good Magic (2015)	Glinda the Good (2009)	Magical Flash (1990)	Gil's Magic (1983)
Dam Puca (2012)	Big Brown (2005)	Boundary (1990)	Danzig* (1977)
Dam Puca (2012)	Big Brown (2005)	Boundary (1990)	Edge (1978)
Dam Puca (2012)	Big Brown (2005)	Mien (1999)	Nureyev (1977)
Dam Puca (2012)	Big Brown (2005)	Mien (1999)	Miasma (1992)
Dam Puca (2012)	Boat's Ghost (2004)	Silver Ghost (1982)	Mr Prospector* (1970)
Dam Puca (2012)	Boat's Ghost (2004)	Silver Ghost (1982)	Misty Gallore (1976)
Dam Puca (2012)	Boat's Ghost (2004)	Rocktheboat (1996)	Summer Squall (1987)
Dam Puca (2012)	Boat's Ghost (2004)	Rocktheboat (1996)	Native Boat (1989)

*^ Dornoch is inbred 4S x 5S x 4D to the stallion Mr Prospector, meaning that he appears fourth and fifth generation (via Miswaki)^ on the sire side of his pedigree and fourth generation on the dam side of his pedigree.

* Dornoch is inbred 4S x 4D to the stallion Danzig, meaning that he appears fourth generation on the sire side of his pedigree and fourth generation on the dam side of his pedigree.
