= Mindframe =

Thoroughbred race horse

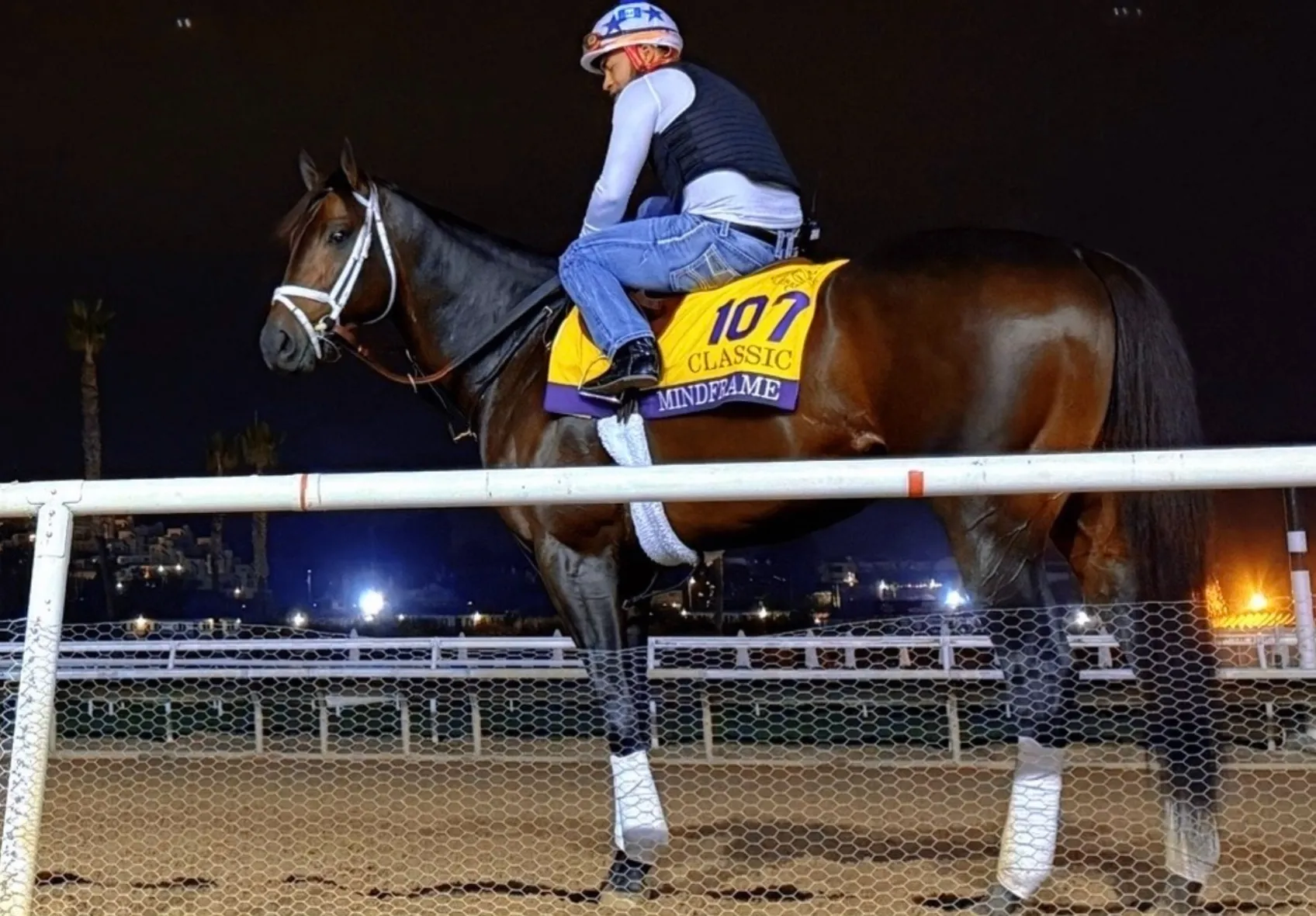
- Sire: Constitution
- Grandsire: Tapit
- Dam: Walk of Stars
- Damsire: Street Sense
- Sex: Colt
- Foaled: May 13, 2021 (age 4); Maryland, U.S.
- Country: United States
- Color: Dark Bay or Brown
- Breeder: R. Larry Johnson
- Owner: Repole Stable & St. Elias Stables
- Trainer: Todd A. Pletcher
- Record: 9: 5 – 2 – 0
- Earnings: $2,154,580

Major wins
- Gulfstream Park Mile Stakes (2025); Churchill Downs Stakes (2025); Stephen Foster Stakes (2025)
- Last updated on November 2, 2025

Mindframe (foaled May 13, 2021) is a multiple-Grade one winning American Thoroughbred racehorse who won the Churchill Downs Stakes and Stephen Foster Stakes at Churchill Downs in 2025.

== Background ==
Mindframe is a dark bay or brown colt bred in Maryland by R. Larry Johnson (1946–2025). His sire Constitution won the 2014 Florida Derby Constitution, in 2025 stands for $110,000 at WinStar Farm.

His dam, Walk of Stars, won five events including the 2015 Pink Ribbon Stakes at Charles Town race track. R. Larry Johnson also owned the mare as well as the second dam Star Kell and the third dam Special Kell who were both winners in their careers.

Mindframe was sold by his consigner Betz Thoroughbreds at the September yearling Keeneland Sales in 2022 for $600,000 to Repole Stable & St. Elias Stables.

== Racing career ==
Mindframe did not race as a two-year-old and began his three-year-old campaign with a win in a Maiden Special Weight event by 13 1/4 lengths, which he followed with a victory in an Allowance Optional Claiming event at Churchill Downs.

Connections then pointed Mindframe to the Grade 1 Belmont Stakes, which in 2024 and 2025 was relocated to Saratoga and run at 1 1/4 miles instead of the usual 1 1/2 miles because of construction at Belmont Park. Sent off at 5-1 odds, Mindframe stalked the leaders, Preakness Stakes winner Seize the Grey and Dornoch, before being sent to the lead by jockey Irad Ortiz Jr.. Mindframe challenged entering the stretch, briefly passing Dornoch. As Mindframe drifted in the stretch, Dornoch regained the lead and went on to win by a half length.

Mindframe was then shipped to Monmouth Park to contest their signature race, the Haskell Stakes. He was sent off as the 4-5 favorite. Mindframe stumbled at the start, and Dornoch was sent to the lead and contested with second choice Timberlake on the far turn. Dornoch eventually turned back Timberlake and held on to win by 1 1/4 lengths with Mindframe in second place.

As a four-year-old, Mindframe was the 1-10 favorite in the Gulfstream Park Mile Stakes, where he stalked leader Encino before sprinting away in the straight and easing down for a 1 1/4 lengths victory.

Mindframe then shortened up by winning the Grade I Churchill Downs Stakes over seven furlongs.

On June 28, 2025, Mindframe won the Grade I Stephen Foster Stakes at Churchill Downs, defeating the 2024 Breeders' Cup Classic winner Sierra Leone, and the 2024 Kentucky Derby, winner Mystik Dan.

== Statistics ==
Date	Distance	Race	Grade	Track	Odds	Field	Finish	Winning Time	Winning (Losing) Margin	Jockey	Ref
2024 – Three-year-old season
Mar 30, 2024	7 furlongs	Maiden Special Weight		Gulfstream Park	1.10*	11	1	1:21.72	13 3/4 lengths	Irad Ortiz Jr.	
May 4, 2024	1 1/16 miles	Allowance Optional Claiming		Churchill Downs	0.46*	8	1	1:43.17	7 1/2 lengths	Irad Ortiz Jr.	
Jun 8, 2024	1 1/4 miles	Belmont Stakes	I	Saratoga	5.00	10	2	2:01.64	(1/2 length)	Irad Ortiz Jr.	
Jul 20, 2024	1 1/8 miles	Haskell Stakes	I	Monmouth Park	0.80*	7	2	1:50.31	(1 1/4 lengths)	Irad Ortiz Jr.	
2025 – Four-year-old season
Mar 1, 2025	1 mile	Gulfstream Park Mile Stakes	II	Gulfstream Park	0.10*	8	1	1:36.25	1 1/4 lengths	Irad Ortiz Jr.	
May 3, 2025	7 furlongs	Churchill Downs Stakes	I	Churchill Downs	3.54	11	1	1:22.64	neck	Irad Ortiz Jr.	
Jun 28, 2025	1 1/8 miles	Stephen Foster Stakes	I	Churchill Downs	1.88*	6	1	1:47.48	1 length	Irad Ortiz Jr.	
Aug 31, 2025	1 1/4 miles	Jockey Club Gold Cup	I	Saratoga	1.80	8	DNF	2:02.16	-	Irad Ortiz Jr.	
Nov 1, 2025	1 1/4 miles	Breeders' Cup Classic	I	Del Mar	7.30	9	5	2:00.19	(7 1/4 lengths)	Irad Ortiz Jr.	

Notes:
An (*) asterisk after the odds means Mindframe was the post-time favourite.

== Pedigree ==
Pedigree of Mindframe, dark bay or brown colt, foaled May 13, 2021
Sire Constitution (2011)	Tapit (2001)	Pulpit (1994)	A.P. Indy (1989)
Sire Constitution (2011)	Tapit (2001)	Pulpit (1994)	Preach (1989)
Sire Constitution (2011)	Tapit (2001)	Tap Your Heels (1996)	Unbridled (1987)
Sire Constitution (2011)	Tapit (2001)	Tap Your Heels (1996)	Ruby Slippers (1982)
Sire Constitution (2011)	Baffled (2005)	Distorted Humor (1993)	Forty Niner (1985)
Sire Constitution (2011)	Baffled (2005)	Distorted Humor (1993)	Danzig's Beauty (1987)
Sire Constitution (2011)	Baffled (2005)	Surf Club (1998)	Ocean Crest (1991)
Sire Constitution (2011)	Baffled (2005)	Surf Club (1998)	Horns Gray (1991)
Dam Walk of Stars (2011)	Street Sense (2004)	Street Cry (IRE) (1998)	Machiavellian (1987)
Dam Walk of Stars (2011)	Street Sense (2004)	Street Cry (IRE) (1998)	Helen Street (GB) (1982)
Dam Walk of Stars (2011)	Street Sense (2004)	Bedazzle (1997)	Dixieland Band (1980)
Dam Walk of Stars (2011)	Street Sense (2004)	Bedazzle (1997)	Majestic Legend (1985)
Dam Walk of Stars (2011)	Star Kell (1997)	Star de Naskra (1975)	Naskra (1967)
Dam Walk of Stars (2011)	Star Kell (1997)	Star de Naskra (1975)	Candle Star (1967)
Dam Walk of Stars (2011)	Star Kell (1997)	Special Kell (1987)	Parfaitement (1980)
Dam Walk of Stars (2011)	Star Kell (1997)	Special Kell (1987)	Ran's Chick (1976)
