= Good Magic =

American Thoroughbred racehorse

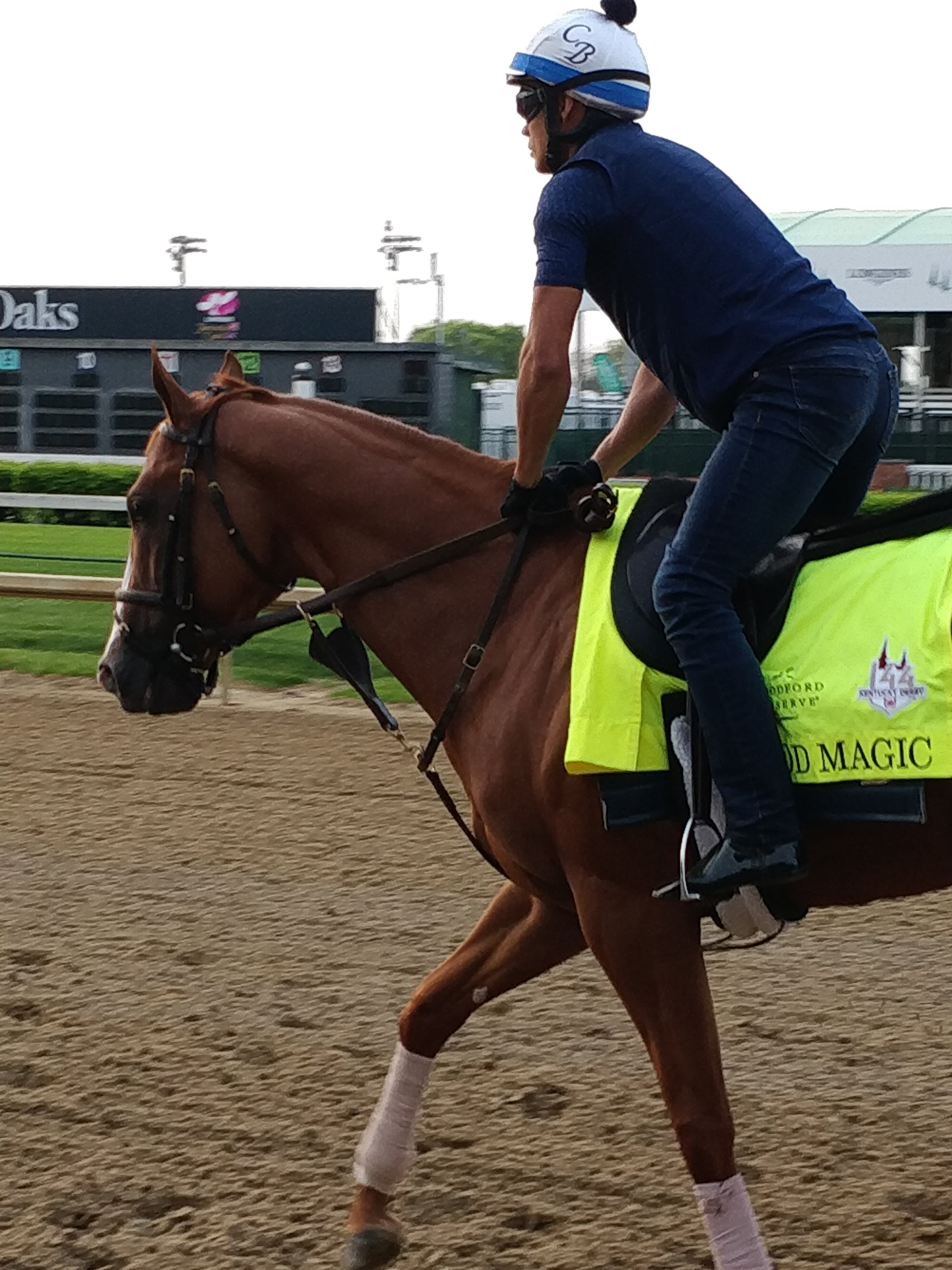
- Good Magic training before the Kentucky Derby
- Sire: Curlin
- Grandsire: Smart Strike
- Dam: Glinda the Good
- Damsire: Hard Spun
- Sex: Colt
- Foaled: March 1, 2015
- Country: United States
- Colour: Chestnut
- Breeder: Stonestreet Thoroughbred Holdings
- Owner: e Five Racing & Stonestreet Stables
- Trainer: Chad Brown
- Record: 9: 3-3-1
- Earnings: $2,945,000

Major wins
- Blue Grass Stakes (2018); Haskell Invitational (2018) Breeders' Cup wins: Breeders' Cup Juvenile (2017)

Awards
- American Champion Two-Year-Old Male Horse (2017)
- Last updated on September 24, 2018

Good Magic (foaled March 1, 2015) is a retired Champion American Thoroughbred racehorse. He became the first horse to ever break his maiden in the Breeders' Cup when he won the 2017 Breeders' Cup Juvenile. As a three-year-old, he won the Blue Grass Stakes and Haskell Invitational, and finished second to Justify in the 2018 Kentucky Derby.

== Background ==
Good Magic is a chestnut colt bred in Kentucky by Stonestreet Stables, which is now owned by Barbara Banke. Banke is the widow of Jess Stonestreet Jackson, who co-owned two-time Horse of the Year Curlin, whose wins included the Preakness Stakes, Breeders' Cup Classic and Dubai World Cup. Curlin is the sire of Good Magic and multiple other stakes winners including Exaggerator, Stellar Wind, Keen Ice and Palace Malice. Good Magic's dam is Glinda the Good, a stakes-winning daughter of Hard Spun.

Good Magic was sold at the 2016 Keeneland September Yearling Sales for $1 million to Bob Edward's e Five Racing. Edwards, who also owns the pet pharmaceutical company e5 Pharma, started horseracing operations in August 2015. Banke subsequently bought back a share of the colt.

Good Magic was trained by Chad Brown.

== Racing career ==
Good Magic made his racing debut on August 26, 2017, in a maiden special weight race at Saratoga. Going off as the odds-on favorite, he stalked the early pace but was unable to get by the winner, Hazit, who prevailed by a length.

Despite the loss, Brown stepped the colt up to Grade I company in the Champagne Stakes at Belmont Park on October 7. The field included only one graded stakes winner, Firenze Fire, but had several highly regarded maiden race winners like Hazit and Aveenu Malcainu. Good Magic raced in mid-pack behind a fast early pace then made a wide move around the turn to hit the lead in mid-stretch. However, he was then overtaken by Firenze Fire, who closed from well back to win by half a length.

Believing Good Magic was rapidly improving and would benefit from longer races, Brown decided to enter him in the Breeders' Cup Juvenile at Del Mar on November 4. The favorite was the undefeated Bolt d'Oro, whose wins included the FrontRunner Stakes. The field also included Solomini (second in the FrontRunner), Firenze Fire (Champagne), The Tabulator (Iroquois Stakes) and Free Drop Billy (Breeders' Futurity).

Good Magic broke well and settled near the rail behind the early leaders, Solomini and U S Navy Flag, with The Tabulator racing alongside. Rounding the final turn, Solomini moved to the lead as U S Navy Flag started to tire. With U S Navy Flag in front of him and The Tabulator on his outside, Good Magic's jockey, José Ortiz, decided to wait rather than try to squeeze by on the rail, having been warned by Brown that the inside of the track was not playing well. When a gap opened, Good Magic split horses, moved to the outside and "zoomed past" Solomini on his way to a 4 1/4-length victory. Good Magic became the first horse to ever break his maiden at the Breeders' Cup.

"He's not a real big horse", said Brown, "but he's growing. It was his first time around two turns, and he aced the test."

Good Magic received a Beyer Speed Figure of 100 for the win and entered into consideration for the Eclipse Award for champion two-year-old. In Pool 1 of the future wager for the 2018 Kentucky Derby, he was made the top individual pick at 8–1.

On January 25, 2018, he was named the 2017 American Champion Two-Year-Old Male Horse.

=== 2018: three-year-old season ===
Good Magic made his first start of 2018 in the Fountain of Youth Stakes at Gulfstream Park on March 3. Although he had trained well in the weeks before the race, Good Magic was considered vulnerable due to a lack of racing fitness. He settled in fourth place behind Promises Fulfilled, who set a steady pace and held on to win as an 18-1 longshot. Good Magic started to close ground around the turn but flattened down the stretch to finish third.

On April 7, Good Magic made his next start in the Blue Grass Stakes at Keeneland racetrack. He settled into fifth behind the early pace set by Arawak and Flameaway, then launched his move around the far turn, drawing away down the stretch for a 1 1/2-length win. "He ran maybe a little short fitness-wise in his last race and came back and redeemed himself today", said Brown. "He put himself right at the top of the class again."

On May 5, Good Magic was entered in the 2018 Kentucky Derby, going off as the sixth betting choice at odds of 9.7-1 in a field of 20. The favorite was Justify, winner of the Santa Anita Derby. The track was muddy after exceptionally heavy rain throughout the day. Good Magic broke well and settled a few lengths behind a fast early pace set by Promises Fulfilled and Justify. As they rounded the final turn, Promises Fulfilled dropped back while Good Magic shifted to the outside and started to make up ground on Justify. He closed to within a length and a half at the top of the stretch before Justify again pulled away, eventually winning by 2 1/2 lengths. Good Magic tired in the final strides but still hung on for second against a fast closing Audible.

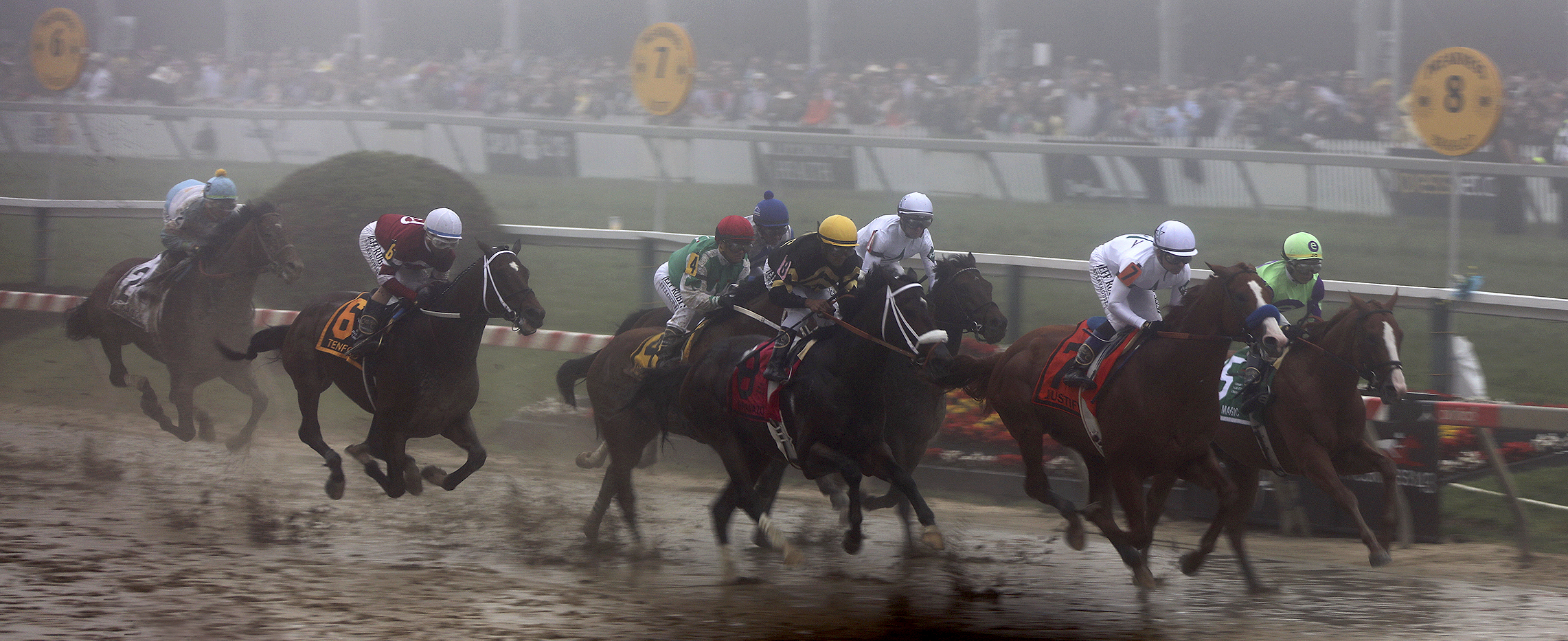
Good Magic (on the rail) challenges Justify early in the Preakness

Good Magic's connections decided to race him just two weeks later in the 2018 Preakness Stakes, where he again faced Justify over a sloppy track. This time, Ortiz decided to press the pace more closely and raced side by side with Justify until mid-stretch. At that point, Justify started to inch away while Bravazo and Tenfold started closing rapidly. In a blanket finish, Good Magic finished fourth to Justify, but just one length behind. The change in tactics was somewhat controversial, with Ortiz feeling that he had "messed up". Brown was also disappointed because Good Magic does not like to be on the lead, but felt the colt's inside post position and the lack of other early speed horses didn't leave Ortiz with many options.

Good Magic was given a long layoff to recover from his spring campaign, then returned on July 29 in the Haskell Invitational. With Justify having recently retired with a minor injury, Good Magic was made the 1-2 favorite in a field of seven. He stalked the early pace set by longshot Roaming Union, then took the lead as they rounded the final turn. He widened his lead to four lengths in mid-stretch before easing up near the finish line, winning by three lengths over Bravazo.

Good Magic made his next start on August 25 as the favorite in the Travers Stakes, but was never a factor and finished ninth. After the race, Brown discovered the colt had a high white blood cell count indicating an infection. Before sending the colt to Stonestreet Farm for some time off, he decided to send the colt to Rood & Riddle Equine Hospital for evaluation.

== Retirement ==
Good Magic was officially retired on September 24, 2018. From 2019 Good Magic stands at Hill 'n' Dale Farms. His fee in 2022 was $30,000. In 2022 his son Blazing Sevens become his first Grade I offspring by winning the Grade I Champagne Stakes at Aqueduct Racetrack. In 2023 his son Mage won the Kentucky Derby and in 2024 Dornoch won the Belmont Stakes. Mage and Dornoch are full brothers whose dam is Puca. Good Magic's 2024 stud fee is $125,000.

=== Notable progeny ===
His major stakes winners include: c = colt, f = filly, g = gelding

Foaled	Name	Sex	Major Wins
2020	Blazing Sevens	c	Champagne Stakes
2020	Mage	c	Kentucky Derby
2020	Mixto	c	Pacific Classic Stakes
2021	Muth	c	American Pharoah Stakes, Arkansas Derby
2021	Dornoch	c	Belmont Stakes

== Statistics ==
Date	Age	Distance	Race	Grade	Track	Odds	Field	Finish	Winning Time	Winning (Losing) Margin	Jockey	Ref
Aug 26, 2017	2	6 1/2 furlongs	Maiden Special Weight	Maiden	Saratoga	0.75*	5	2	1:16.40	(1 length)	John Velazquez	
Oct 7, 2017	2	1 mile	Champagne Stakes	Grade I	Belmont Park	4.30	12	2	1:35.91	(1/2 length)	José Ortiz	
Nov 4, 2017	2	1 1/16 miles	Breeders' Cup Juvenile	Grade I	Del Mar	11.50	12	1	1:43.34	4 1/4 lengths	José Ortiz	
Mar 3, 2018	3	1 1/16 miles	Fountain of Youth Stakes	Grade II	Gulfstream Park	0.70*	9	3	1:44.17	(2 lengths)	José Ortiz	
Apr 7, 2018	3	1 1/8 miles	Blue Grass Stakes	Grade II	Keeneland	1.60*	14	1	1:50.18	1 1/2 lengths	José Ortiz	
May 5, 2018	3	1 1/4 miles	Kentucky Derby	Grade I	Churchill Downs	9.70	20	2	2:05.31	(2 1/2 lengths)	José Ortiz	
May 19, 2018	3	1 3/16 miles	Preakness Stakes	Grade I	Pimlico	3.90	8	4	1:58.62	(1 length)	José Ortiz	
July 29, 2018	3	1 1/8 miles	Haskell Invitational	Grade I	Monmouth Park	0.50*	7	1	1:50.01	3 lengths	José Ortiz	
Aug 25, 2018	3	1 1/4 miles	Travers Stakes	Grade I	Saratoga	1.45*	10	9	2:01.94	(15 1/2 lengths)	José Ortiz	

An asterisk after the odds means Good Magic was the post-time favorite.

== Pedigree ==
Pedigree of Good Magic, chestnut colt, March 1, 2015
Sire Curlin 2004	Smart Strike; 1992	Mr. Prospector	Raise a Native
Sire Curlin 2004	Smart Strike; 1992	Mr. Prospector	Gold Digger
Sire Curlin 2004	Smart Strike; 1992	Classy 'n Smart	Smarten
Sire Curlin 2004	Smart Strike; 1992	Classy 'n Smart	No Class
Sire Curlin 2004	Sherriff's Deputy; 1994	Deputy Minister	Vice Regent
Sire Curlin 2004	Sherriff's Deputy; 1994	Deputy Minister	Mint Copy
Sire Curlin 2004	Sherriff's Deputy; 1994	Barbarika	Bates Motel
Sire Curlin 2004	Sherriff's Deputy; 1994	Barbarika	War Exchange
Dam Glinda the Good 2009	Hard Spun; 2004	Danzig	Northern Dancer
Dam Glinda the Good 2009	Hard Spun; 2004	Danzig	Pas de Nom
Dam Glinda the Good 2009	Hard Spun; 2004	Turkish Tryst	Turkoman
Dam Glinda the Good 2009	Hard Spun; 2004	Turkish Tryst	Darbyvail
Dam Glinda the Good 2009	Magical Flash; 1990	Miswaki	Mr. Prospector
Dam Glinda the Good 2009	Magical Flash; 1990	Miswaki	Hopespringseternal
Dam Glinda the Good 2009	Magical Flash; 1990	Gils Magic	Magesterial
Dam Glinda the Good 2009	Magical Flash; 1990	Gils Magic	Display Copy (family: 12-c)

Good Magic is inbred 3S x 4D to Mr. Prospector, meaning this stallion appears in the third generation of the sire's side of the pedigree and in the fourth generation of the dam's side. Good Magic is also inbred 5S x 4D x 5D to Northern Dancer.
