= McKinzie =

McKinzie is a surname. Notable people with the surname include:

- Barbara McKinzie, American accountant
- Edith Kawelohea McKinzie, Hawaiian genealogist, writer, and hula expert
- Ralph McKinzie (1894–1990), American football, baseball and basketball coach

== See also ==
- McKinzie Islands, islands of Antarctica
- Ralph McKinzie Field, a baseball venue in DeKalb, Illinois
- McKinzie - a thoroughbred racehorse
