= 2024 Belmont Stakes =

American horse race

156th Belmont Stakes
- Belmont Stakes
- Grade I stakes race
- Location: Saratoga Race Course; Saratoga Springs, New York, US
- Date: June 8, 2024
- Distance: 1 1/4 mi (10 furlongs; 2,012 m)
- Winning horse: Dornoch
- Winning time: 2:01.64
- Final odds: 17.70
- Jockey: Luis Saez
- Trainer: Danny Gargan
- Owner: West Paces Racing, R. A. Hill Stable, Belmar Racing and Breeding, Two Eight Racing & Pine Racing Stables
- Conditions: Fast
- Attendance: 50,000

The 2024 Belmont Stakes was the 156th running of the Belmont Stakes and the first time the event took place at Saratoga Race Course, due to renovations at Belmont Park. The 1 1/4 miles (10 furlongs; 2,012 meters) race was won by upset Dornoch (17-1) with a time of 2:01.64.

The race took place on June 8, 2024 at 6:50 p.m. EDT and was shorter than the usual 1 1/2 miles (12 furlongs; 2,414 metres) due to Saratoga's smaller main dirt track. Television coverage was broadcast by Fox Sports.

On December 8, 2023, New York Governor Kathy Hochul announced a US$ 455 million renovation plan for Belmont Park in Elmont, New York which would move the Belmont Stakes to Saratoga Race Course in Saratoga Springs, New York for the interim, with construction expected to last into 2025. The prize purse had been increased from $1.5 million to $2 million.

The most recent time a Belmont Stakes was not held at Belmont Park was when it was held at Aqueduct Race Track in Ozone Park, Queens from 1963 to 1967, the last time Belmont Park was under construction.

== Result ==
A field of 10 was drawn for the race on June 3rd. Sierra Leone was installed as the 9-5 morning line favorite.

Finish	Program Number	Horse	Jockey	Trainer	Morning Line Odds	Final Odds	Margin (Lengths)	Winnings
1	6	Dornoch	Luis Saez	Danny Gargan	15-1	17.70		$1,200,000
2	10	Mindframe	Irad Ortiz Jr.	Todd A. Pletcher	7-2	5.00	1/2	$360,000
3	9	Sierra Leone	Flavien Prat	Chad C. Brown	9-5	1.70	1 1/2	$200,000
4	8	Honor Marie	Florent Geroux	D. Whitworth Beckman	12-1	14.10	5 1/2	$100,000
5	5	Antiquarian	John R. Velazquez	Todd A. Pletcher	12-1	12.60	7 1/2	$60,000
6	7	Protective	Tyler Gaffalione	Todd A. Pletcher	20-1	19.60	9 3/4	$40,000
7	1	Seize the Grey	Jamie Torres	D. Wayne Lukas	8-1	5.30	12 3/4	$20,000
8	3	Mystik Dan	Brian Hernandez Jr.	Kenneth G. McPeek	5-1	6.40	15 3/4	$20,000
9	4	The Wine Steward	Manuel Franco	Michael J. Maker	15-1	18.00	21 3/4	
10	2	Resilience	Junior Alvarado	William I. Mott	10-1	12.80	33 1/4	

Track condition: Fast

Times: 1/4 mile – 22.99; 1/2 mile – 47.25; 3/4 mile – 1:10.67; mile – 1:35.51; final – 2:01.64.
Splits for each quarter-mile: (24:26) (23:42) (24:84) (26:13)

== Payout ==
Based on a $2 bet:

Pgm	Horse	Win	Place	Show
6	Dornoch	$37.40	$17.60	$8.10
10	Mindframe	–	$6.80	$4.20
9	Sierra Leone	–	–	$2.60

- $1 Exacta (6-10) $163.25
- $1 Trifecta: (6-10-9) $473.00
- $1 Superfecta: (6-10-9-8) $3,200.50

Preceded by 2024 Preakness Stakes	Triple Crown	Succeeded by 2025 Kentucky Derby
