= Diketo (game) =

Indigenous game of Botswana

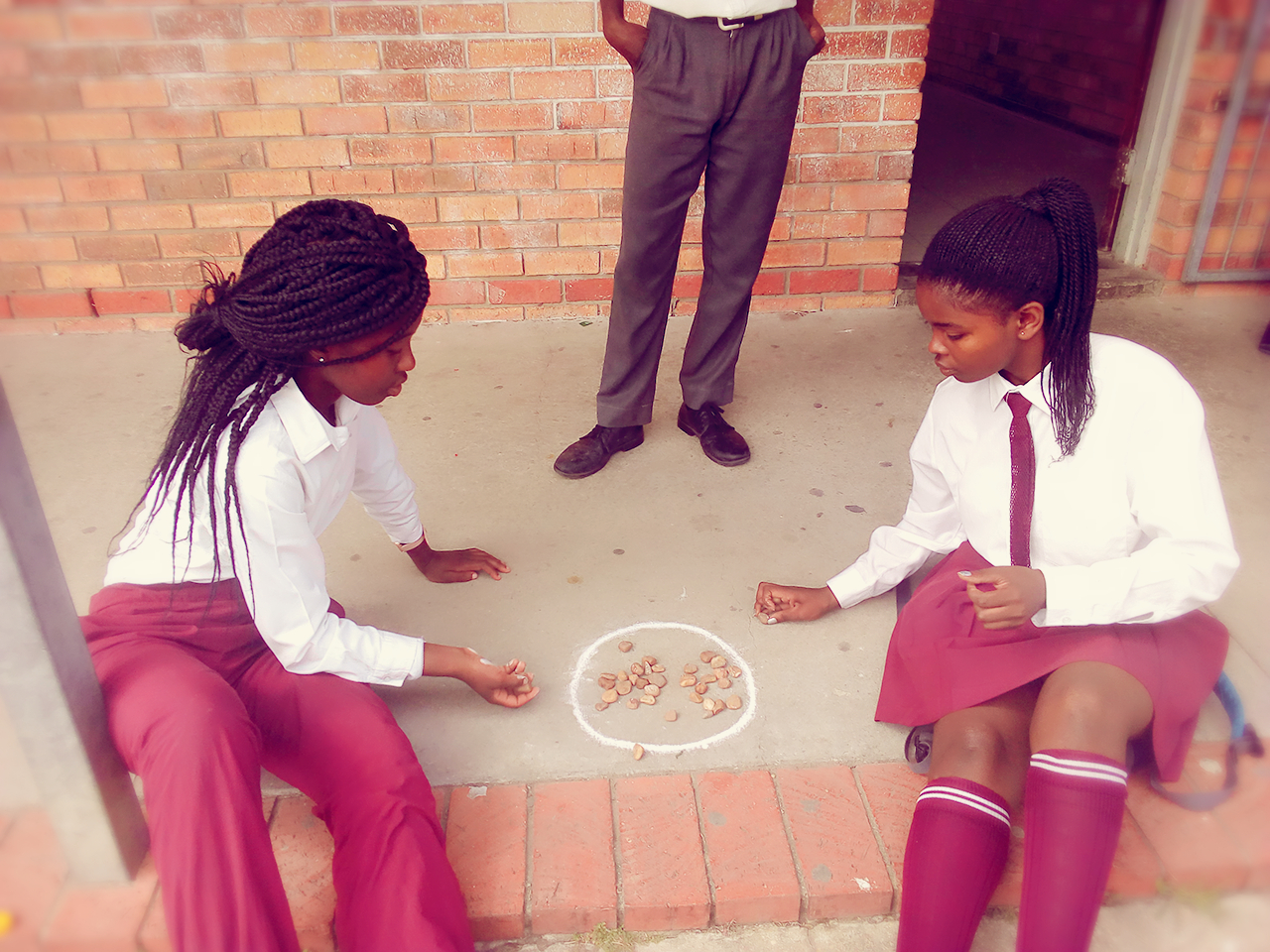
Two girls playing Puca.

Diketo, also known as Magave, Upuca, or Puca, is one of ten recognized indigenous games of South Africa, Lesotho and Botswana . It is similar to the game Jacks.

== Rules ==
Diketo is usually played by two players and can be played with pebbles or marbles. The player throws a stone called "mokinto" into the air and then tries to take out as many stones as possible from the circle before they catch it again with the same hand. Then they put the stones back into the hole, one stone at a time, until all ten stones are back in the hole. The player can only move a stone while the "gho"/"mokinto" is in the air, and before catching it again with the same hand. The player then takes out all the stones again and puts them back in the hole now two at a time and so on. If the player fails to catch the gho, it is the next player's turn. The player who manages to do ten rounds of taking the stones out and systematically placing them back in first, wins the game.
