= Haskell Stakes =

- Class: Grade I
- Location: Monmouth Park Racetrack; Oceanport, New Jersey, U.S.
- Inaugurated: 1968 (as Monmouth Invitational Handicap)
- Race type: Thoroughbred – Flat racing
- Sponsor: NYRA Bets (since 2024)
- Website: Monmouth Park

Race information
- Distance: 1 1/8 miles
- Surface: Dirt
- Track: left-handed
- Qualification: Three-year-olds
- Weight: 122 lbs. with allowances
- Purse: $1,000,000 (since 1997)
- Bonuses: Winner automatic entry into Breeders' Cup Classic

The Haskell Stakes is a Grade I American Thoroughbred horse race for three-year-olds run over a distance of 1 1/8 miles on the dirt held annually in July at Monmouth Park Racetrack in Oceanport, New Jersey. The event is a signature event at Monmouth Park during their summer racing season and a major race for three-year-olds in between the U.S. Triple Crown series and the Breeders' Cup. The event currently offers a purse of US$1,000,000.

== History ==
The inaugural running of the race was on 3 August 1968, closing day of the Monmouth Park summer meeting, as the Monmouth Invitational Handicap with a field of eleven horses. It was won by 33-1 longshot Balustrade, ridden by Canadian jockey Eric Walsh, in a time of 1:50 flat with favorite Iron Ruler finishing fourth.

In 1973, when the American Graded Stakes Committee was founded by the Thoroughbred Owners and Breeders Association, the Monmouth Invitational Handicap immediately was given the highest classification of Grade I.

In the 1976, Majestic Light set a track record of 1:47 flat, winning by six lengths. The track record was broken by Spend A Buck in 1985. In 1987, Belmont Stakes winner Bet Twice won and equaled the stakes mark.

In 1981, the board of directors of Monmouth Park Racetrack switched the name of the Amory L. Haskell Handicap with this event, giving it the name Haskell Invitational Handicap. Amory L. Haskell (1893–1966) was the former president and chair of Monmouth Park.

In 1997, the purse for the race was increased to $1,000,000 and has remained at that level with two exceptions. In 2006, the race was changed from a handicap to allowance weight conditions, and the name was modified to the Haskell Invitational Stakes. In 2002, the purse was increased to $1,500,000 due to the presence of War Emblem, winner of the Kentucky Derby and Preakness Stakes. In 2015, the purse was increased to $1,750,000 as it featured American Pharoah in his first race since winning the Triple Crown. The 2015 running attracted a record New Jersey crowd of 60,983.

In 2020, the race ceased to be an Invitational, and the name was changed to simply the Haskell Stakes.

In 2026, the horse Baby Vino won, making Lindsay Schultz the first woman to train a Haskell winner.

The race has attracted many sponsors including Buick (1996−1998), Izod (2010), William Hill (2013−2015), betfair.com (2016−2018), and TVG.com (2019–2023). In 2024, NYRA Bets (the betting platform owned by the New York Racing Association) became the title sponsor.

Eleven winners of the Haskell have won championship honors at the Eclipse Awards as best three-year-old colt or filly. Five have also been named horse of the year in the year they won the Haskell. They are:

- Champion three-year-old colts: Wajima (1975), Holy Bull (1994), Skip Away (1996), Point Given (2001), War Emblem (2002), Big Brown (2008), Lookin at Lucky (2010), American Pharoah (2015), Authentic (2020)
- Champion three-year-old fillies: Serena's Song (1995), Rachel Alexandra (2009)
- Horses of the Year: Holy Bull (1994), Point Given (2001), Rachel Alexandra (2009), American Pharoah (2015), Authentic (2020)

== Records ==
Stakes record

- 1:46.24 – Cyberknife (2022)

Largest winning margin

- 9 3/4 lengths – Verrazano (2013)

Most wins by a jockey:

- 4 – Mike E. Smith (1994, 1998, 2020, 2023)

Most wins by a trainer:

- 9 – Bob Baffert (2001, 2002, 2005, 2010, 2011, 2012, 2014, 2015, 2020)

Most wins by an owner:

- 2 – The Thoroughbred Corporation (2001, 2002)
- 2 – WinStar Farm (2006, 2007)
- 2 – Stonerside Stable (1998, 2009)
- 2 – Michael Pegram, Karl Watson & Paul Weitman (2010, 2011)
- 2 – Zayat Stables (2012, 2015)

== Winners ==
Year	Winner	Jockey	Trainer	Owner	Time	Purse	Grade	Ref
Haskell Stakes
2026	Baby Vino	Jorge A. Vargas Jr.	Lindsay Schultz	Cosmo Stables and Delta Squad Racing, LLC	1:50.18	$1,005,000	I	
2025	Journalism	Umberto Rispoli	Michael W. McCarthy	Eclipse Thoroughbred Partners, Bridlewood Farm, Don Alberto Stable, Robert V. LaPenta, Elayne Stables Five, Mrs. John Magnier, Michael Tabor & Derrick Smith	1:48.15	$1,017,500	I	
2024	Dornoch	Luis Saez	Danny Gargan	West Paces Racing, R. A. Hill Stable, Belmar Racing and Breeding, Two Eight Racing & Pine Racing Stables	1:50.31	$1,017,500	I	
2023	Geaux Rocket Ride	Mike E. Smith	Richard E. Mandella	Pin Oak Stud	1:49.52	$1,017,500	I	
2022	Cyberknife	Florent Geroux	Brad H. Cox	Gold Square LLC	1:46.24	$1,017,500	I	
2021	Mandaloun †	Florent Geroux	Brad H. Cox	Juddmonte	1:47.38	$1,005,000	I	
2020	Authentic	Mike E. Smith	Bob Baffert	Spendthrift Farm, MyRacehorse Stable, Madaket Stables & Starlight Racing	1:50.45	$1,005,000	I	
Haskell Invitational Stakes
2019	Maximum Security	Luis Saez	Jason Servis	Gary & Mary West	1:47.56	$990,000	I	
2018	Good Magic	Jose L. Ortiz	Chad C. Brown	e Five Racing & Stonestreet Stables	1:50.01	$1,010,000	I	
2017	Girvin	Robby Albarado	Joe Sharp	Brad Grady	1:48.35	$1,010,000	I	
2016	Exaggerator	Kent J. Desormeaux	J. Keith Desormeaux	Big Chief Racing, Rocker O Ranch, Head of Plains Partners & J. Keith Desormeaux	1:48.70	$1,015,000	I	
2015	American Pharoah	Victor Espinoza	Bob Baffert	Zayat Stables	1:47.95	$1,750,000	I	
2014	Bayern	Martin Garcia	Bob Baffert	Kaleem Shah	1:47.82	$1,030,000	I	
2013	Verrazano	John R. Velazquez	Todd A. Pletcher	Let's Go Stable, Derrick Smith, Mrs. John Magnier & Michael Tabor	1:50.68	$1,010,000	I	
2012	Paynter	Rafael Bejarano	Bob Baffert	Zayat Stables	1:48.67	$1,000,000	I	
2011	Coil	Martin Garcia	Bob Baffert	Michael Pegram, Karl Watson & Paul Weitman	1:48.10	$1,020,000	I	
2010	Lookin At Lucky	Martin Garcia	Bob Baffert	Michael Pegram, Karl Watson & Paul Weitman	1:49.40	$1,010,000	I	
2009	Rachel Alexandra ƒ	Calvin H. Borel	Steven M. Asmussen	Stonestreet Stables & Harold McCormick	1:47.21	$1,250,000	I	
2008	Big Brown	Kent J. Desormeaux	Richard E. Dutrow Jr.	IEAH Stables, Paul Pompa Jr., Gary Tolchin, Andrew Cohen & Pegasus Holdings	1:48.31	$1,010,000	I	
2007	Any Given Saturday	Garrett K. Gomez	Todd A. Pletcher	WinStar Farm & Padua Stables	1:48.35	$1,060,000	I	
2006	Bluegrass Cat	John R. Velazquez	Todd A. Pletcher	WinStar Farm	1:48.85	$1,030,000	I	
Haskell Invitational Handicap
2005	Roman Ruler	Jerry D. Bailey	Bob Baffert	Fog City Stable	1:49.88	$1,015,000	I	
2004	Lion Heart	Joe Bravo	Patrick L. Biancone	Derrick Smith & Michael Tabor	1:48.95	$1,000,000	I	
2003	Peace Rules	Edgar S. Prado	Robert J. Frankel	Edmund A. Gann	1:49.32	$1,000,000	I	
2002	War Emblem	Victor Espinoza	Bob Baffert	The Thoroughbred Corporation	1:48.21	$990,000	I	
2001	Point Given	Gary L. Stevens	Bob Baffert	The Thoroughbred Corporation	1:49.77	$1,500,000	I	
2000	Dixie Union	Alex O. Solis	Richard E. Mandella	Diamond A Racing & Herman Sarkowsky	1:50.00	$1,000,000	I	
1999	Menifee	Pat Day	W. Elliott Walden	Arthur B. Hancock III & James H. Stone	1:48.06	$1,000,000	I	
1998	Coronado's Quest	Mike E. Smith	Claude R. McGaughey III	Stuart S. Janney III & Stonerside Stable	1:48.60	$1,000,000	I	
1997	Touch Gold	Chris McCarron	David E. Hofmans	Frank Stronach & Stonerside Stable	1:47.62	$1,240,000	I	
1996	Skip Away	Jose A. Santos	Sonny Hine	Carolyn Hine	1:47.73	$750,000	I	
1995	Serena's Song ƒ	Gary L. Stevens	D. Wayne Lukas	Robert & Beverly Lewis	1:48.94	$500,000	I	
1994	Holy Bull	Mike E. Smith	Jimmy Croll	Warren A. Croll Jr.	1:48.36	$500,000	I	
1993	Kissin Kris	Jose A. Santos	David R. Bell	John A. Franks	1:49.58	$500,000	I	
1992	Technology	Jerry D. Bailey	Sonny Hine	Scott C. Savin & Classic Partners	1:48.78	$500,000	I	
1991	Lost Mountain	Craig Perret	Thomas K. Bohannan	Loblolly Stable	1:48.06	$500,000	I	
1990	Restless Con	Timothy T. Doocy	Duane Offield	Jane Chambers & Barbera Rago	1:49.20	$500,000	I	
1989	King Glorious	Chris McCarron	Jerry Hollendorfer	Four M Stable & Halo Farms	1:49.80	$500,000	I	
1988	Forty Niner	Laffit Pincay Jr.	Woodford C. Stephens	Claiborne Farm	1:47.60	$500,000	I	
1987	Bet Twice	Craig Perret	Jimmy Croll	Cisley Stable & Blanche Levy	1:47.00	$500,000	I	
1986	Wise Times	Christopher P. DeCarlo	Philip A. Gleaves	Russell L. Reineman Stables	1:48.60	$300,000	I	
1985	Skip Trial	Jean-Luc Samyn	Sonny Hine	Mrs. Ben Cohen	1:48.60	$300,000	I	
1984	Big Pistol	Garth Patterson	Lynn S. Whiting	W. Cal Partee	1:47.80	$204,500	I	
1983	Deputed Testamony	Herb McCauley	J. William Boniface	Bonita Farm	1:49.20	$200,000	I	
1982	Wavering Monarch	Randy Romero	George R. Arnold II	Glencrest Farm	1:47.80	$200,000	I	
1981	Five Star Flight	Craig Perret	Ben W. Perkins Sr.	Mr. & Mrs. Arnold A. Wilcox	1:48.40	$200,000	I	
Monmouth Invitational Handicap
1980	Thanks to Tony	Carlos E. Lopez Sr.	Reynaldo H. Nobles	Sui Generis Stables	1:49.40	$150,000	I	
1979	Coastal	Ruben Hernandez	David A. Whiteley	William Haggin Perry	1:48.80	$100,000	I	
1978	Delta Flag	Danny Nied	Lawrence W. Jennings Jr.	Dogwood Stable	1:53.20	$100,000	I	
1977	Affiliate	Miguel A. Rivera	Laz Barrera	Harbor View Farm	1:50.60	$100,000	I	
1976	Majestic Light	Sandy Hawley	John W. Russell	Ogden Mills Phipps	1:47.00	$100,000	I	
1975	Wajima	Braulio Baeza	Stephen A. DiMauro	East-West Stable	1:49.60	$100,000	I	
1974	Holding Pattern	Michael Miceli	Jerome Sarner Jr.	John Gerbas & Bob Schleicher	1:49.80	$100,000	I	
1973	Our Native	Miguel A. Rivera	William J. Resseguet	Elizabeth Pritchard	1:48.60	$100,000	I	
1972	Freetex	Michael Hole	William T. Raymond	Middletown Stable (Joseph & William Stavola)	1:50.00	$100,000		
1971	West Coast Scout	Larry Adams	Mervin J. Marks	Oxford Stable	1:48.00	$100,000		
1970	Twice Worthy	John Ruane	James P. Conway	Saddle Rock Farm	1:48.40	$100,000		
1969	Al Hattab	Ray Broussard	Warren A. Croll Jr.	Pelican Stable (Rachel Carpenter)	1:50.20	$100,000		
1968	Balustrade	Eric Walsh	Morris H. Dixon	Thaddeus R. Trout	1:50.00	$75,000		

Notes:
ƒ Filly or Mare
† In the 2021 running Hot Rod Charlie was first past the winning post but was disqualified and placed seventh (last) for interfering in the stretch run clipping Midnight Bourbon who dislodged his rider Paco Lopez.

== See also ==
- List of American and Canadian Graded races
