= 2019 Dubai World Cup =

- Dubai World Cup
- Location: Meydan Racecourse; Dubai, United Arab Emirates
- Date: 30 March 2019
- Distance: 2,000 metres (about 10 furlongs)
- Winning horse: Thunder Snow
- Winning time: 2:03.87
- Jockey: Christophe Soumillon
- Trainer: Saeed bin Suroor
- Owner: Godolphin
- Conditions: Fast
- Surface: Dirt

The 2019 Dubai World Cup was a horse race run at Meydan Racecourse in Dubai on 30 March 2019. It was the 24th running of the race. The total prize money for the race was US$12 million, with the winner receiving $7.2 million. This was an increase of $2 million on the previous year, making it the world's richest horse race in 2019.

The race was won for the second year running by Thunder Snow, who became the first horse to win the Dubai World Cup twice.

== Entries ==
A total of 13 horses were entered for the race, including Godolphin's defending champion Thunder Snow, who was bidding to become the first horse to win the race for a second time. Al Maktoum Challenge winners North America (Rounds 1 and 2) and Capezzano (Round 3) headed a strong local challenge from the United Arab Emirates, which also included Axelrod, Gronkowski and New Trails. The United States was also well represented with Pegasus World Cup runner-up Seeking The Soul, Breeders' Cup Classic runner-up Gunnevera, along with Audible, Pavel and Yoshida. The field was completed by Japanese challenger K T Brave and the Korean-trained Dolkong.

=== Road to Meydan ===
The contenders' results in key races during the build-up to the Dubai World Cup.

- 3 November 2018: Breeders' Cup Dirt Mile
  - Seeking The Soul (2nd)
- 3 November 2018: Breeders' Cup Classic
  - Gunnevera (2nd), Thunder Snow (3rd), Yoshida (4th), Axelrod (9th), Pavel (10th)
- 23 November 2018: Clark Handicap
  - Seeking The Soul (3rd)
- 2 December 2018: Champions Cup
  - K T Brave (11th), Pavel (15th)
- 26 December 2018: Malibu Stakes
  - Axelrod (4th)
- 10 January 2019: Al Maktoum Challenge, Round 1
  - North America (Won), Dolkong (6th)
- 26 January 2019: Pegasus World Cup Turf
  - Yoshida (6th)
- 26 January 2019: Pegasus World Cup
  - Seeking The Soul (2nd), Audible (5th), Gunnevera (6th)
- 7 February 2019: Al Maktoum Challenge, Round 2
  - North America (Won), New Trails (2nd)
- 28 February 2019: Curlin Handicap
  - Dolkong (Won)
- 9 March 2019: Burj Nahaar
  - Axelrod (10th)
- 9 March 2019: Al Maktoum Challenge, Round 3
  - Capezzano (Won), Thunder Snow (2nd), Dolkong (3rd), New Trails (4th), Gronkowski (5th)

=== Race card ===
The draw for the race was made on 27 March.

K T Brave was later withdrawn, reducing the field to 12.

No.	Draw	Horse	Weight (kg)	Jockey	Trainer	Owner
1	1	Gunnevera (USA)	57.0	Emisael Jaramillo	Antonio Sano (USA)	Salomón Del Valle
2	2	Capezzano (USA)	57.0	Mickael Barzalona	Salem bin Ghadayer (UAE)	Sultan Ali
3	3	North America (GB)	57.0	Richard Mullen	Satish Seemar (UAE)	Ramzan Kadyrov
4	4	Audible (USA)	57.0	Flavien Prat	Todd Pletcher (USA)	WinStar Farm, China Horse Club et al.
5	5	Seeking The Soul (USA)	57.0	Mike E. Smith	Dallas Stewart (USA)	Charles E. Fipke
6	6	Pavel (USA)	57.0	Joel Rosario	Doug O'Neill (USA)	Reddam Racing LLC
7	7	Gronkowski (USA)	57.0	Oisin Murphy	Salem bin Ghadayer (UAE)	Phoenix Thoroughbred III Ltd
8	8	Axelrod (USA)	57.0	Royston Ffrench	Salem bin Ghadayer (UAE)	Phoenix Thoroughbred III Ltd & Slam Dunk Racing
9	9	New Trails (USA)	57.0	Connor Beasley	Ahmad bin Harmash (UAE)	Hamdan Sultan Ali Alsabousi
10	10	Yoshida (JPN)	57.0	José Ortiz	Bill Mott (USA)	China Horse Club, WinStar Farm et al.
NR	NR	K T Brave (JPN)	57.0	João Moreira	Haruki Sugiyama (JPN)	Kazuyoshi Takimoto
12	12	Thunder Snow (IRE)	57.0	Christophe Soumillon	Saeed bin Suroor (GB)	Godolphin
13	13	Dolkong (USA)	57.0	Olivier Doleuze	Simon Foster (KOR)	Lee Tae In

== Race ==
=== Summary ===
North America was fastest out of the gates and took an early lead, with defending champion Thunder Snow breaking well from the second widest draw to move in behind the leader, alongside Capezzano, who was pulling hard on the inside. As the horses settled, Gronkowski moved through to challenge North America for the lead, with the leaders closely followed by Thunder Snow, Capezzano and New Trails. The positions at the front of the race remained unchanged until the final bend, where Capezzano and New Trails quickly faded. Into the home straight, North America started to drop back as Thunder Snow challenged Gronkowski for the lead. The two horses, now clear of the rest of the field, battled all the way to the line, with Thunder Snow getting up to win by a nose in a photo finish, becoming the first horse to win two Dubai World Cups. Gunnevera ran on from the back to take third place, with Pavel staying on to finish fourth.

=== Full result ===
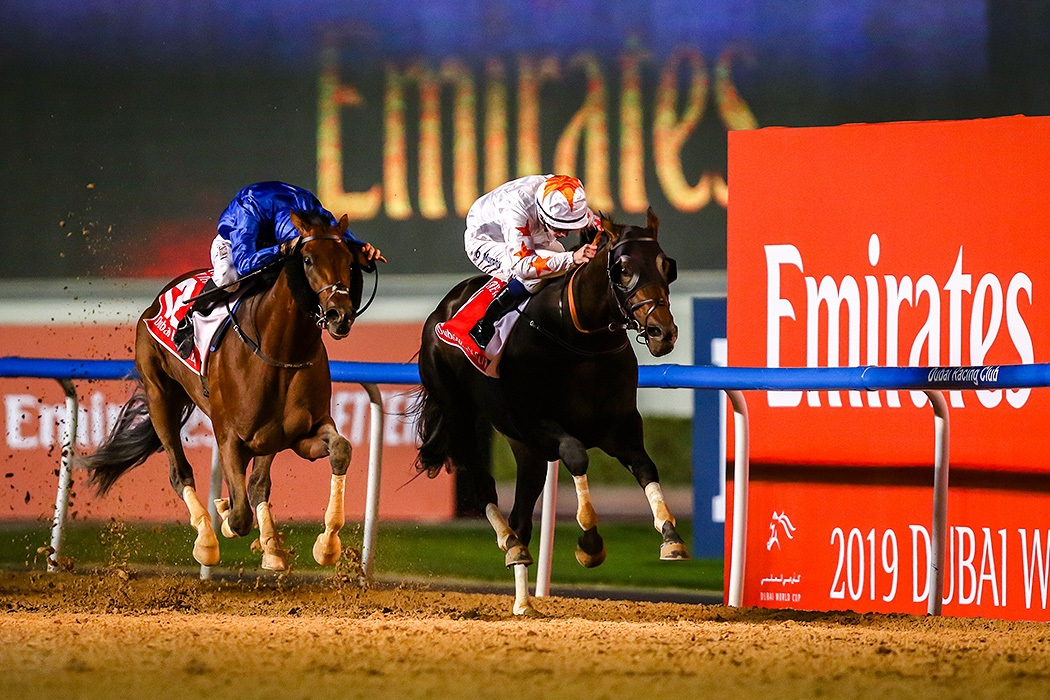
Thunder Snow (left) defeating Gronkowski in a photo finish to win the 2019 Dubai World Cup.

Position	Margin	Horse	Jockey	Trainer	Prize
1		Thunder Snow	Christophe Soumillon	Saeed bin Suroor	$7,200,000
2	nose	Gronkowski	Oisin Murphy	Salem bin Ghadayer	$2,400,000
3	2¾	Gunnevera	Emisael Jaramillo	Antonio Sano	$1,200,000
4	½	Pavel	Joel Rosario	Doug O'Neill	$600,000
5	short head	Audible	Flavien Prat	Todd Pletcher	$360,000
6	1¾	Yoshida	José Ortiz	Bill Mott	$240,000
7	2½	North America	Richard Mullen	Satish Seemar	
8	head	Seeking The Soul	Mike E. Smith	Dallas Stewart	
9	neck	Axelrod	Royston Ffrench	Salem bin Ghadayer	
10	1¼	New Trails	Connor Beasley	Ahmad bin Harmash	
11	6	Dolkong	Olivier Doleuze	Simon Foster	
12	17	Capezzano	Mickael Barzalona	Salem bin Ghadayer	
