= 2018 Breeders' Cup Classic =

Thoroughbred horse race

35th Breeders' Cup Classic
- Breeders' Cup Classic
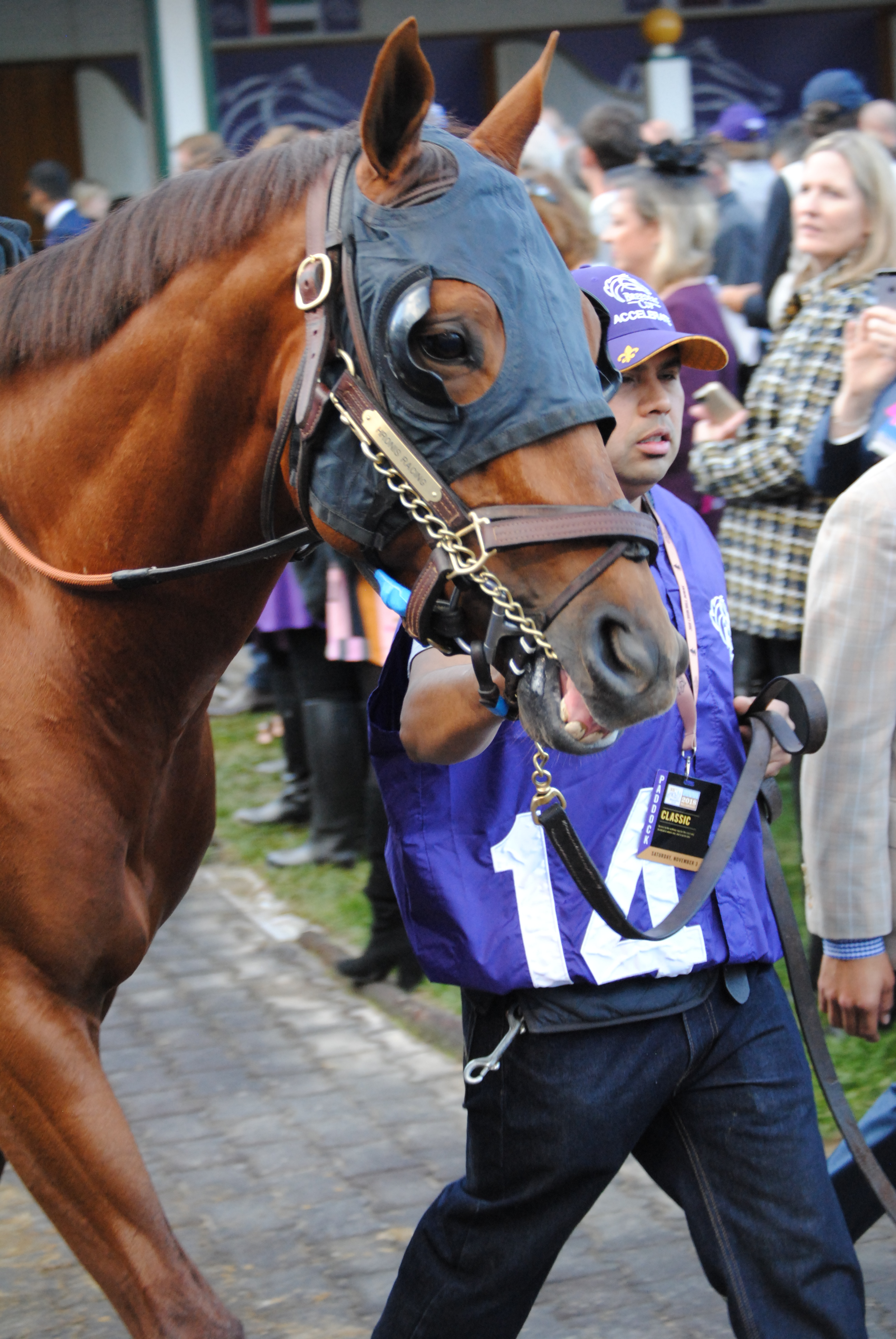
- Accelerate, winner of the 2018 Breeders' Cup Classic
- Location: Churchill Downs
- Date: November 3, 2018
- Winning horse: Accelerate
- Winning time: 2:02.93
- Jockey: Joel Rosario
- Trainer: John Sadler
- Owner: Hronis Racing
- Conditions: Fast
- Surface: Dirt
- Attendance: 70,423

The 2018 Breeders' Cup Classic was the 35th running of the Breeders' Cup Classic, part of the 2018 Breeders' Cup World Thoroughbred Championships program. It was run on November 3, 2018, at Churchill Downs in Louisville, Kentucky with a purse of $6,000,000. It was won by Accelerate, who earned his fifth Grade I win of the year.

The race was broadcast on NBC with a scheduled post time of 5:44 PM (EDT).

The Classic is run on dirt at one mile and one-quarter (approximately 2000 m). It is run under weight-for-age conditions, with entrants carrying the following weights:

- Northern Hemisphere three-year-olds: 122 lb
- Southern Hemisphere three-year-olds: 117 lb
- Four-year-olds and up: 126 lb
- Any fillies or mares receive a 3 lb allowance

== Contenders ==
Pre-entries for the 2018 Classic were announced on October 24 with the post position draw held on October 29.

The field for the 2018 Classic was weakened when the likely Horse of the Year, Justify, was retired in July. Justify won the American Triple Crown and his connections were hoping to complete the Grand Slam of Thoroughbred racing by also winning the Classic. However, a slight injury derailed those plans. Good Magic, winner of the Haskell Invitational and the 2017 champion two-year-old, was also retired due to injury. The connections of another leading contender, Whitney Stakes winner Diversify, opted to bypass the Classic when his trainer, Rick Violette, became ill and subsequently died.

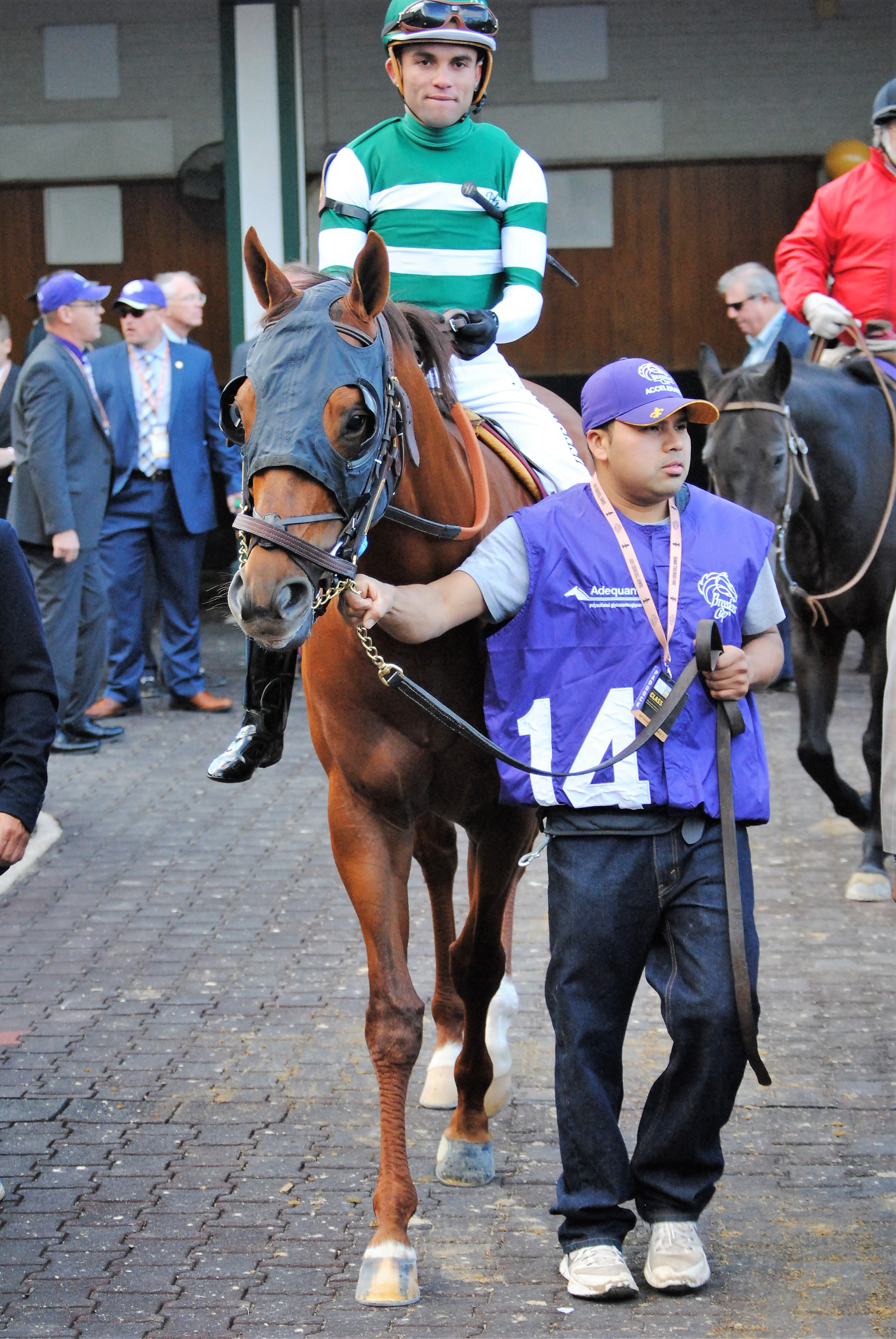
Accelerate

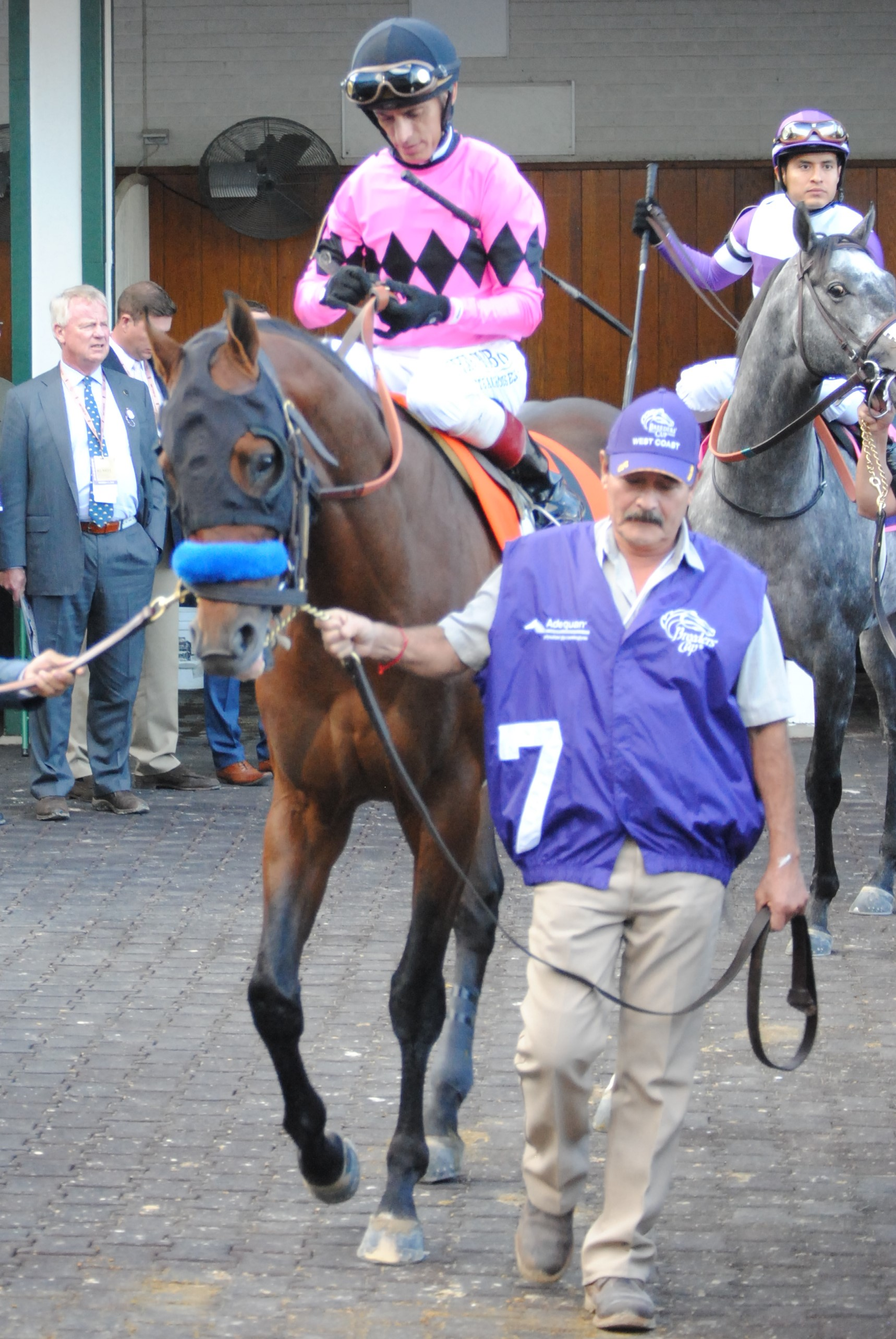
West Coast

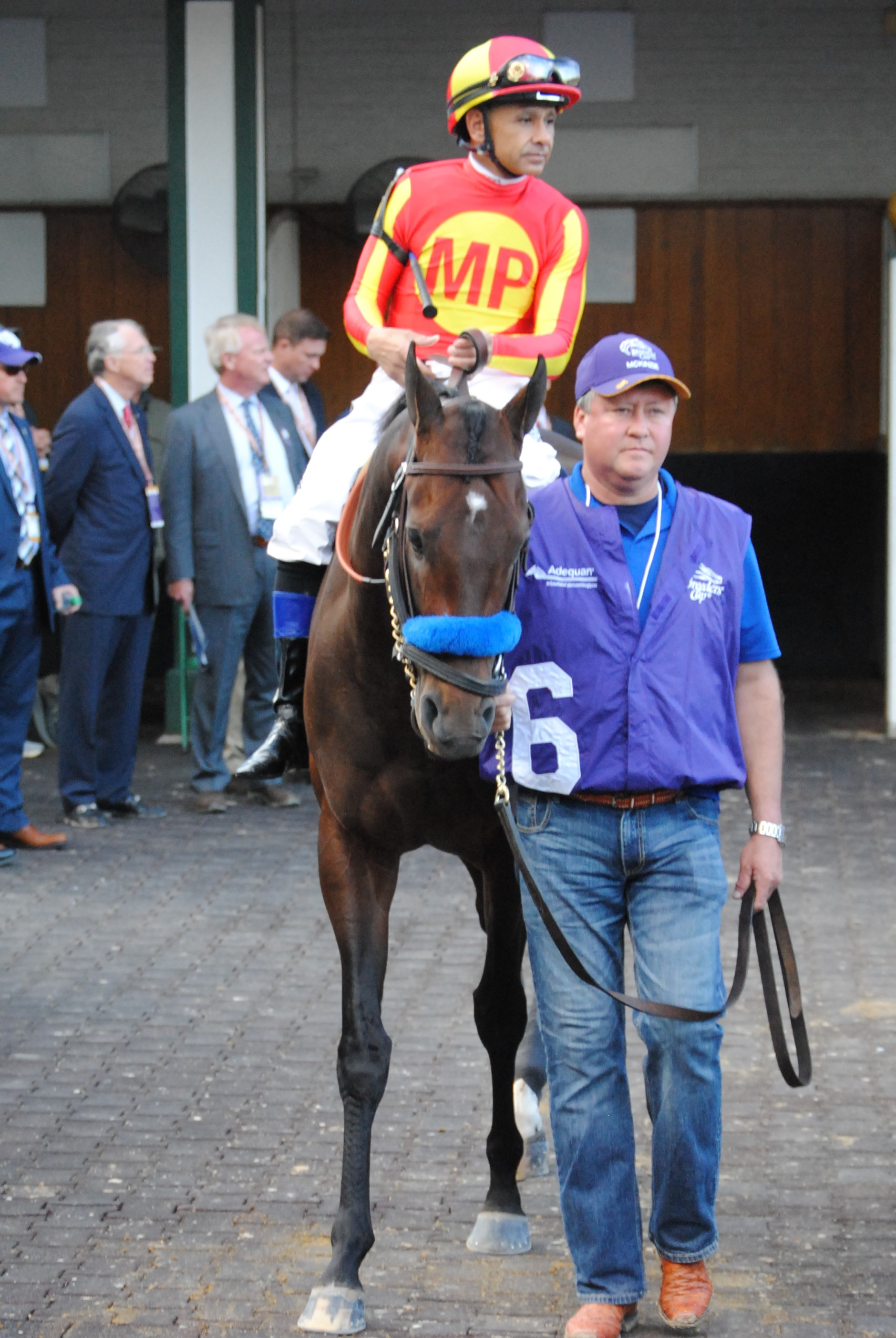
McKinzie

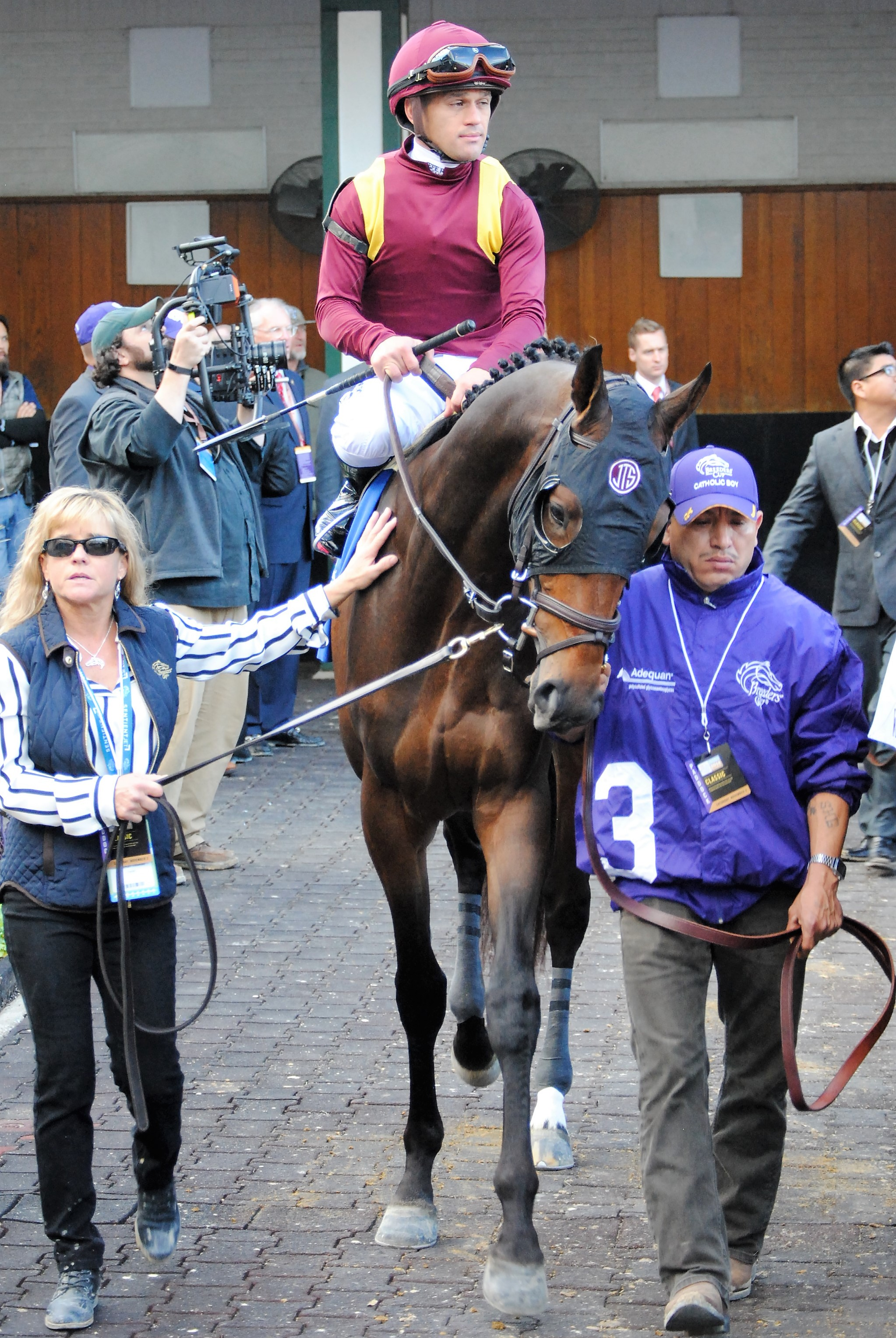
Catholic Boy

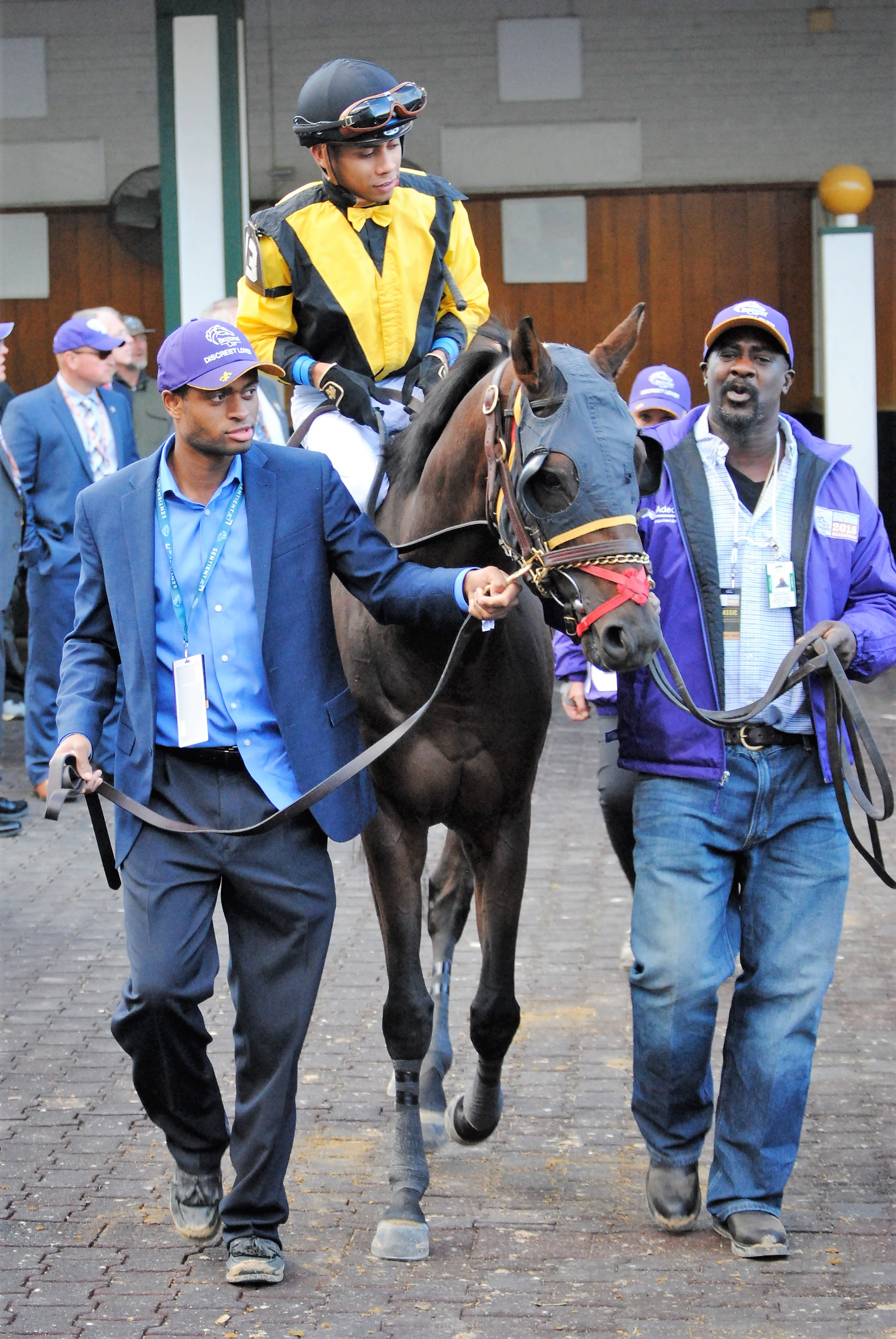
Disceet Lover

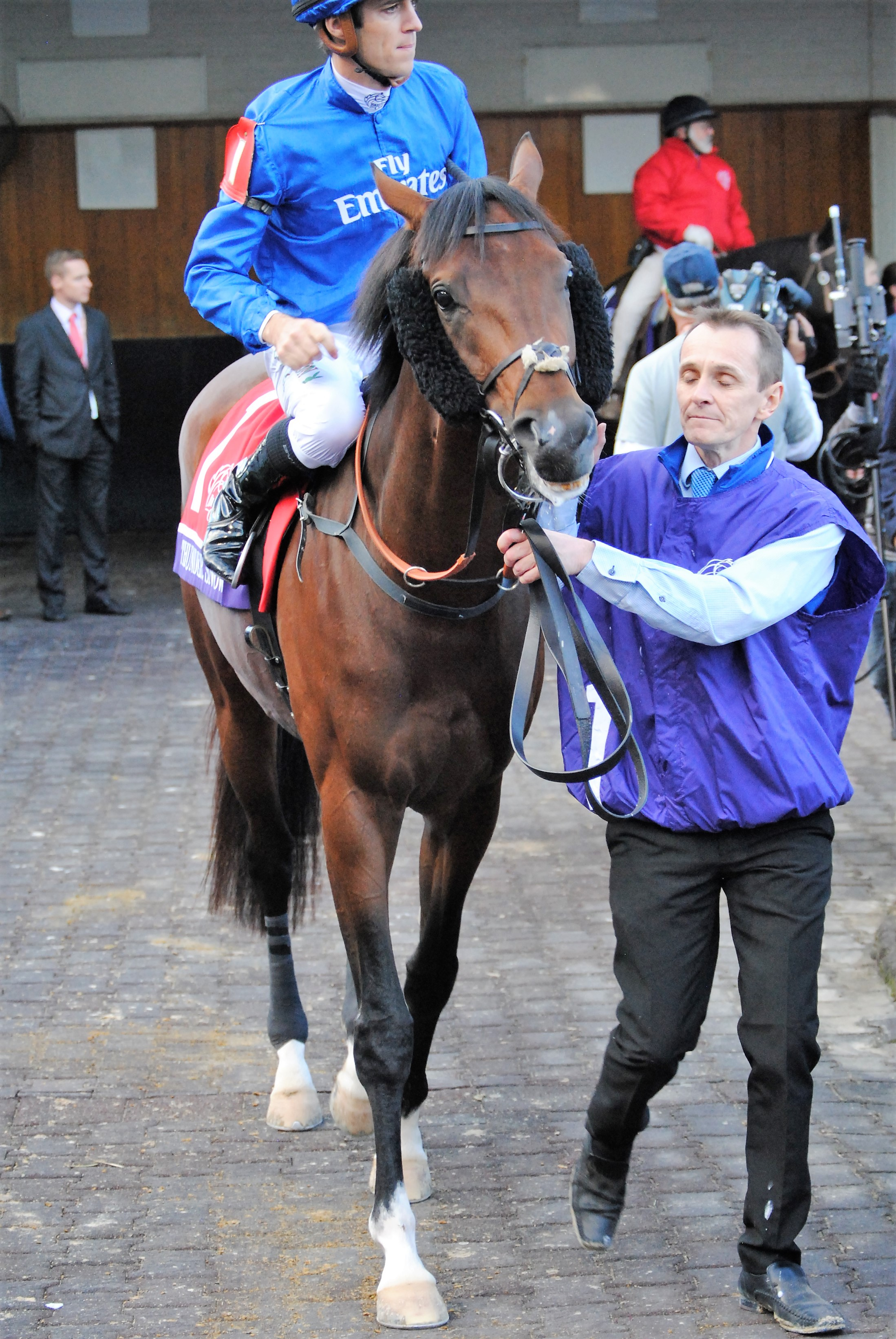
Thunder Snow

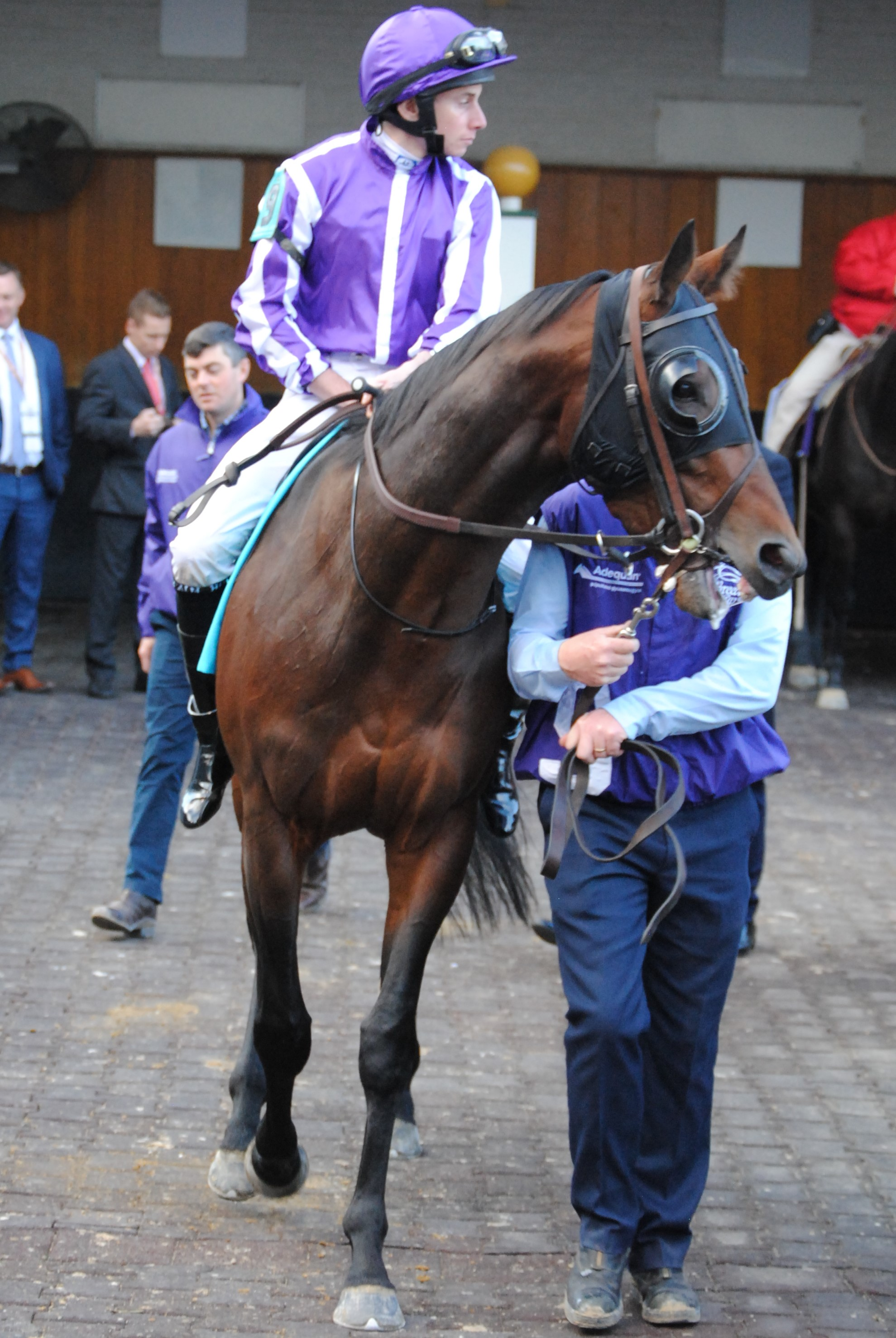
Mendelssohn

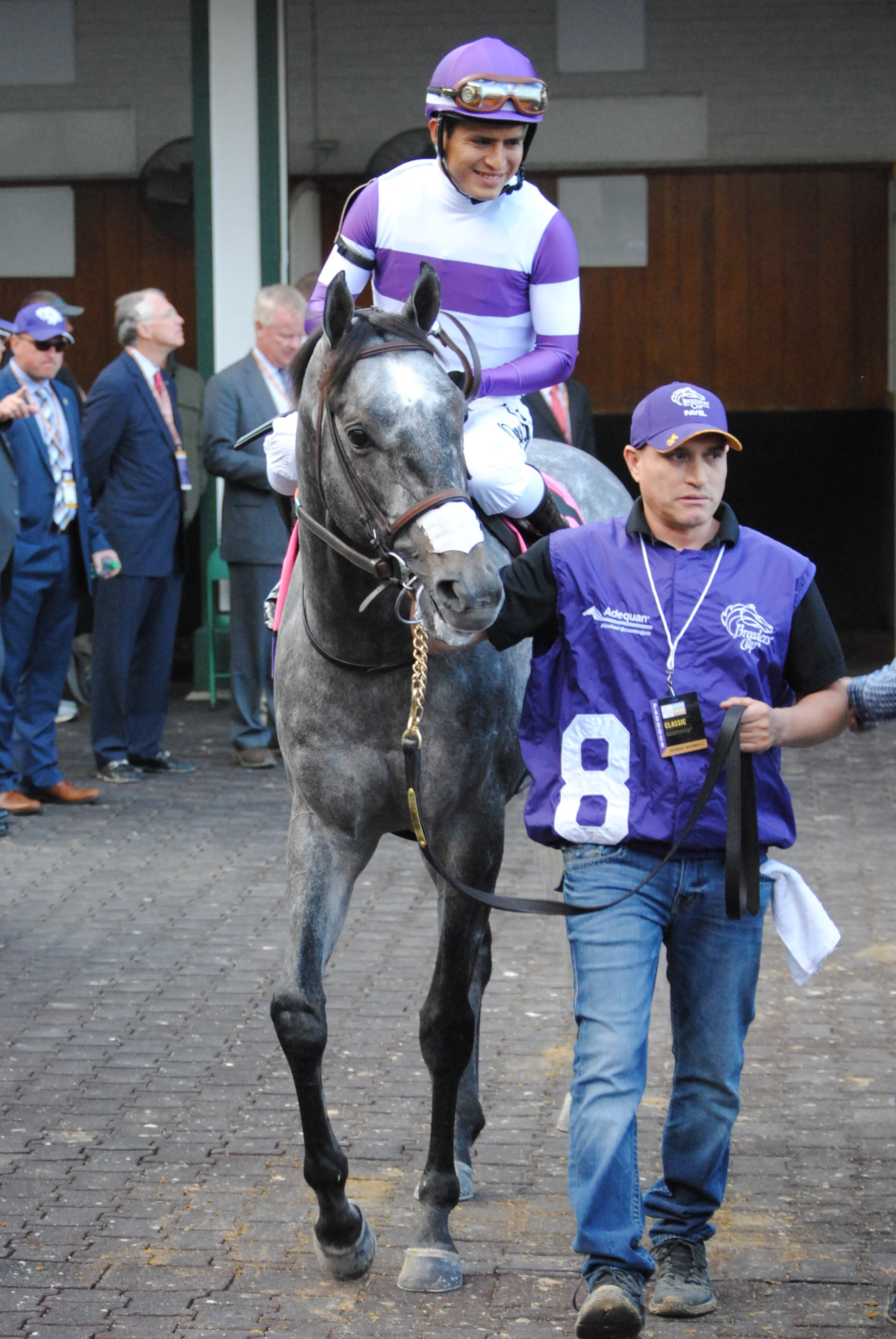
Pavel

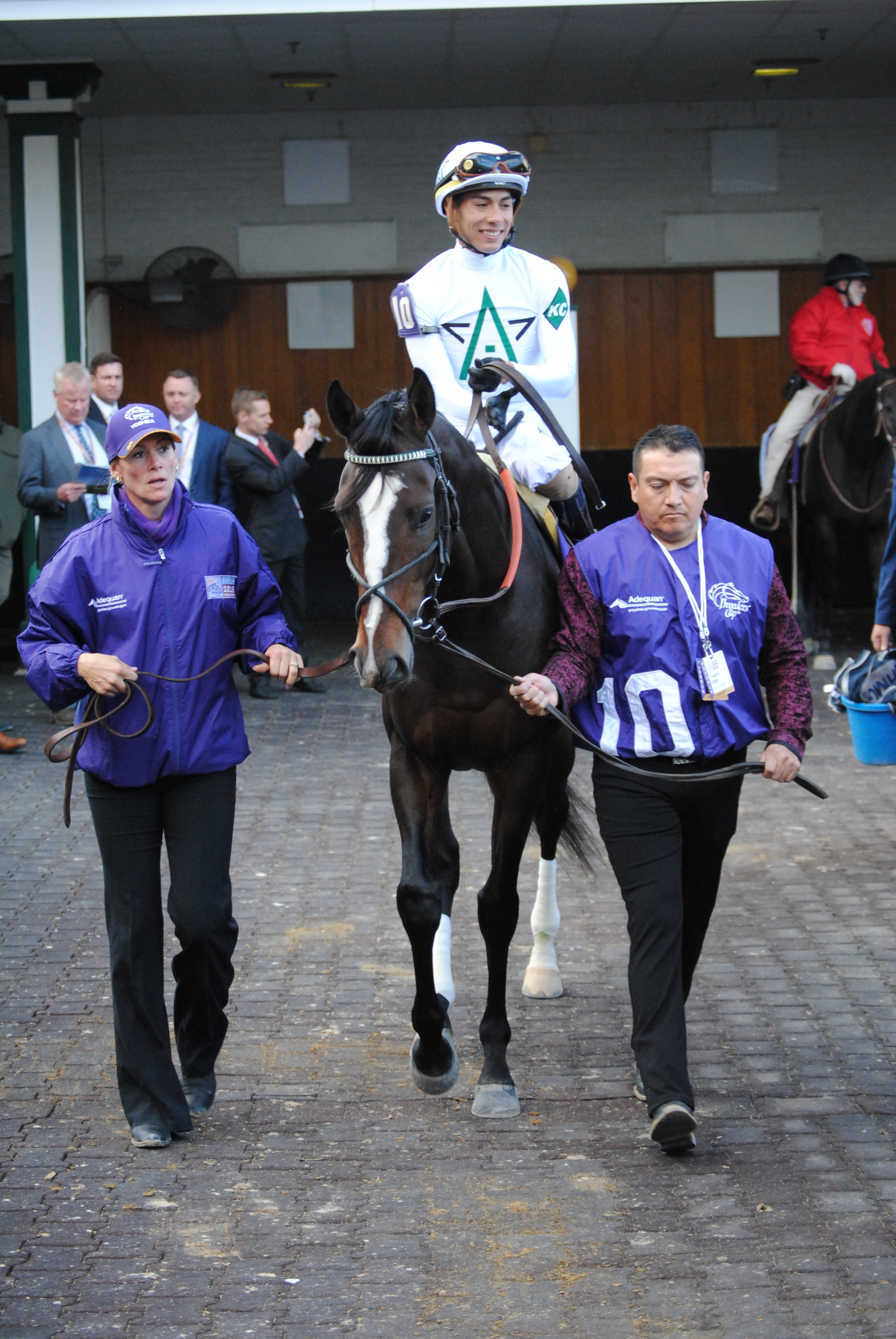
Yoshida

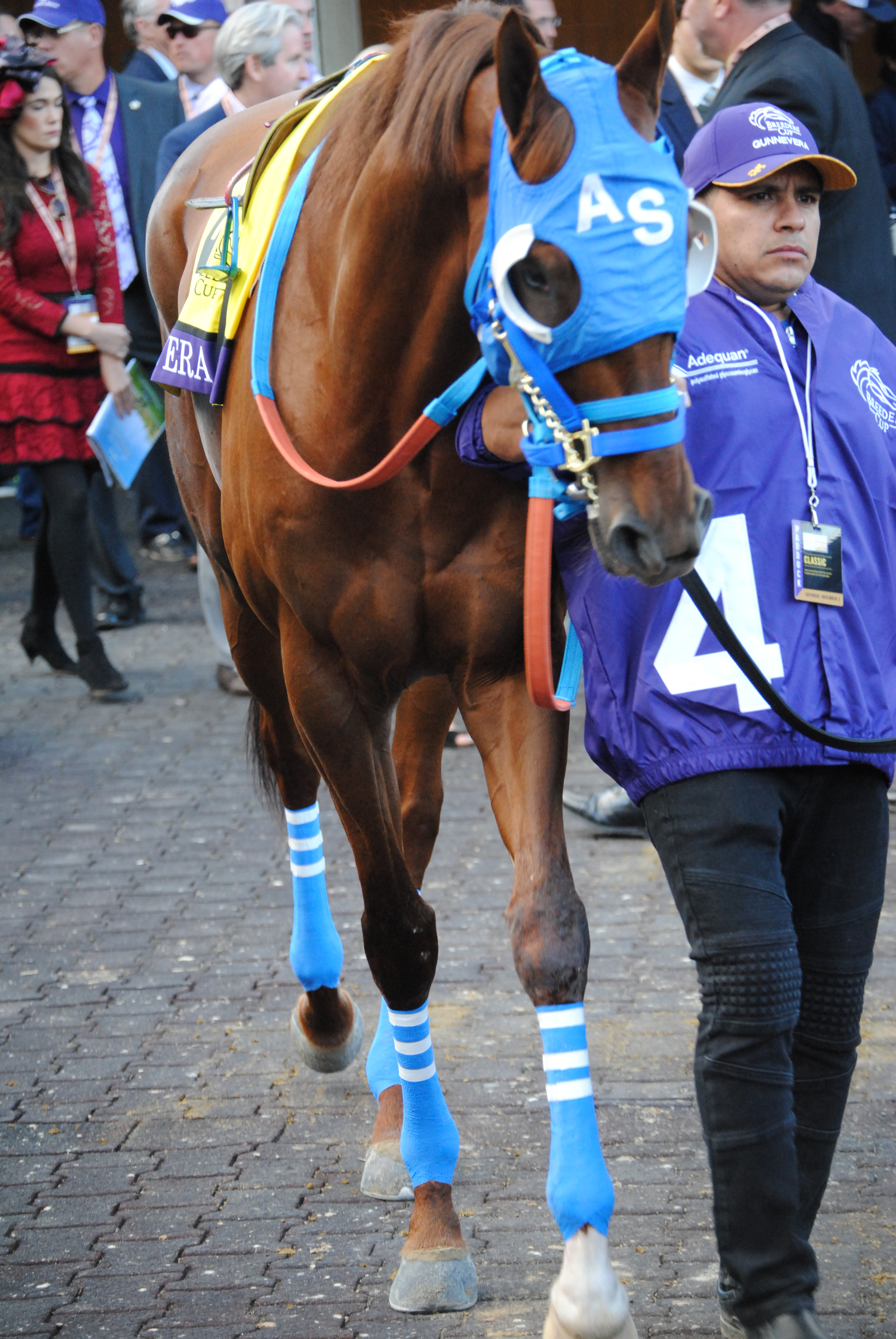
Gunnevera

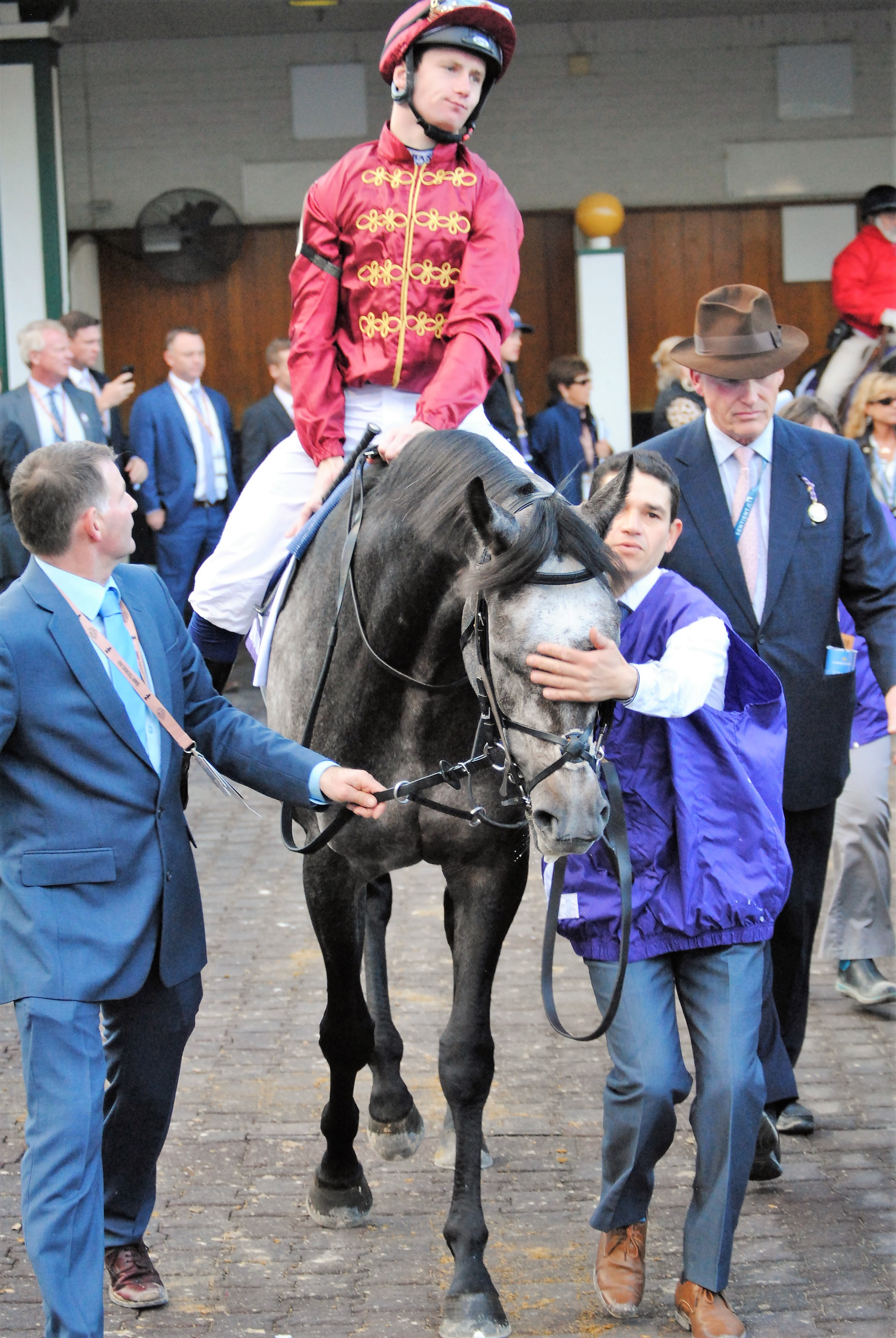
Roaring Lion

In their absence, the race was considered highly competitive. Nineteen horses were pre-entered on October 24, though several of those had first preference in other races on the Breeders' Cup card. The leading contenders included:

- Accelerate, with two 2018 Breeders' Cup Challenge series "Win and You're In" wins in the Pacific Classic and Awesome Again
- West Coast, second in the Awesome Again, Dubai World Cup and Pegasus World Cup
- McKinzie, winner of the Pennsylvania Derby
- Catholic Boy, with Grade I wins on both turf and dirt in the Belmont Derby and Travers Stakes respectively
- Discreet Lover, winner of the Jockey Club Gold Cup
- Thunder Snow, winner of the 2018 Dubai World Cup and second in the Jockey Club Gold Cup
- Mendelssohn, winner of the UAE Derby and third in the Jockey Club Gold Cup
- Pavel, winner of the Stephen Foster Handicap at Churchill Downs in July
- Yoshida, winner of the Woodward Stakes after previously racing exclusively on turf
- Gunnevera, second in the Woodward
- Roaring Lion, with four Group I wins in Europe on the turf

== Race description ==
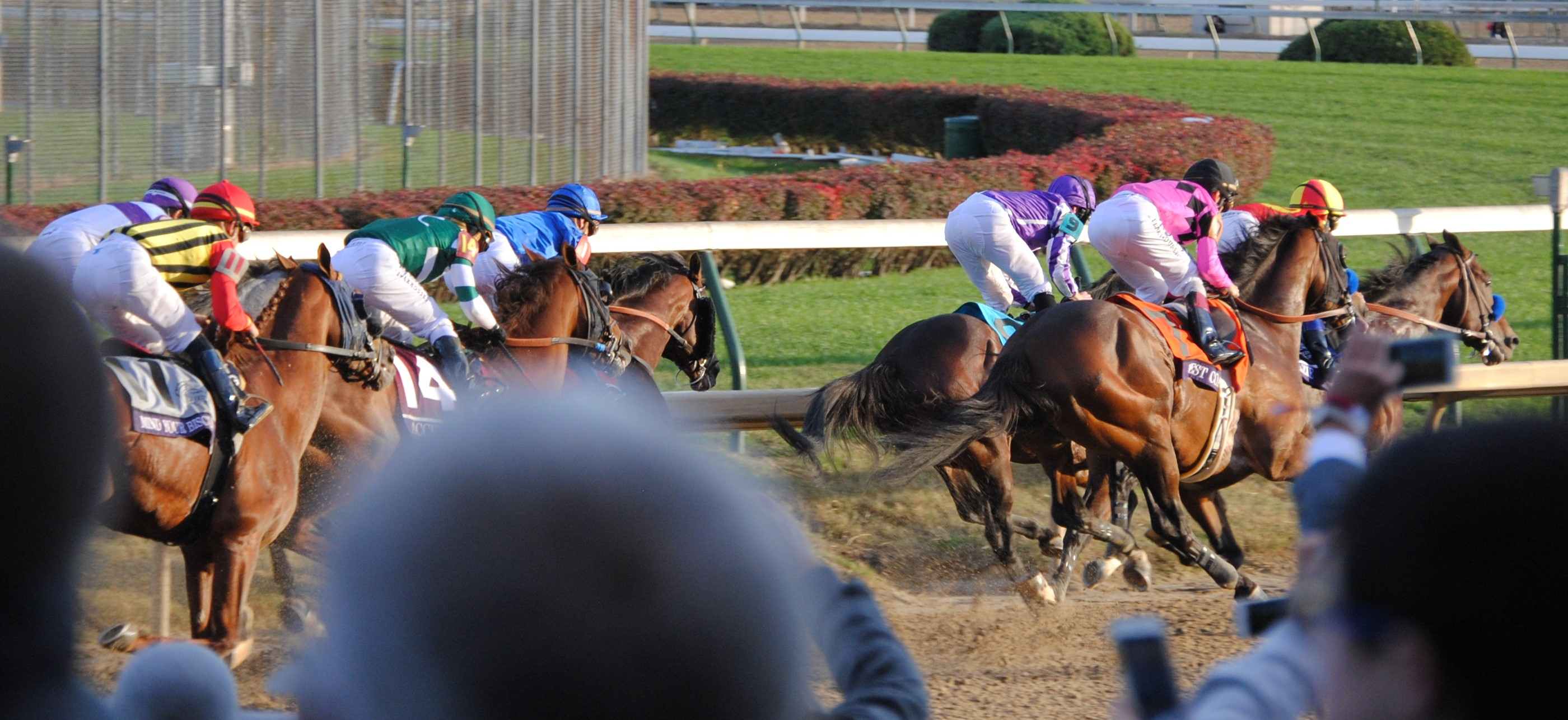
On the rail, Mendelssohn takes the early lead from McKinzie with West Coast in third. Accelerate (#14) lies in fifth

A poor start resulted in the horses with inside posts (Thunder Snow, Roaring Lion, Catholic Boy, Gunnevera) all being bumped and losing position. Yoshida and Lone Sailor also broke poorly and settled at the back of the pack. On the other hand, Mendelssohn broke well from post position nine and worked his way to the rail. He took the lead going into the first turn over McKinzie, with West Coast and Thunder Snow close behind.

Accelerate, who broke from the outside post position, was urged by jockey Joel Rosario to get early position, then rated in fifth place around the first turn and down the backstretch. After starting his move down the far turn, he drew by Mendelssohn at the top of the stretch, then turned back a bid from Thunder Snow. Gunnevera mounted a late charge to take second place, a length behind Accelerate.

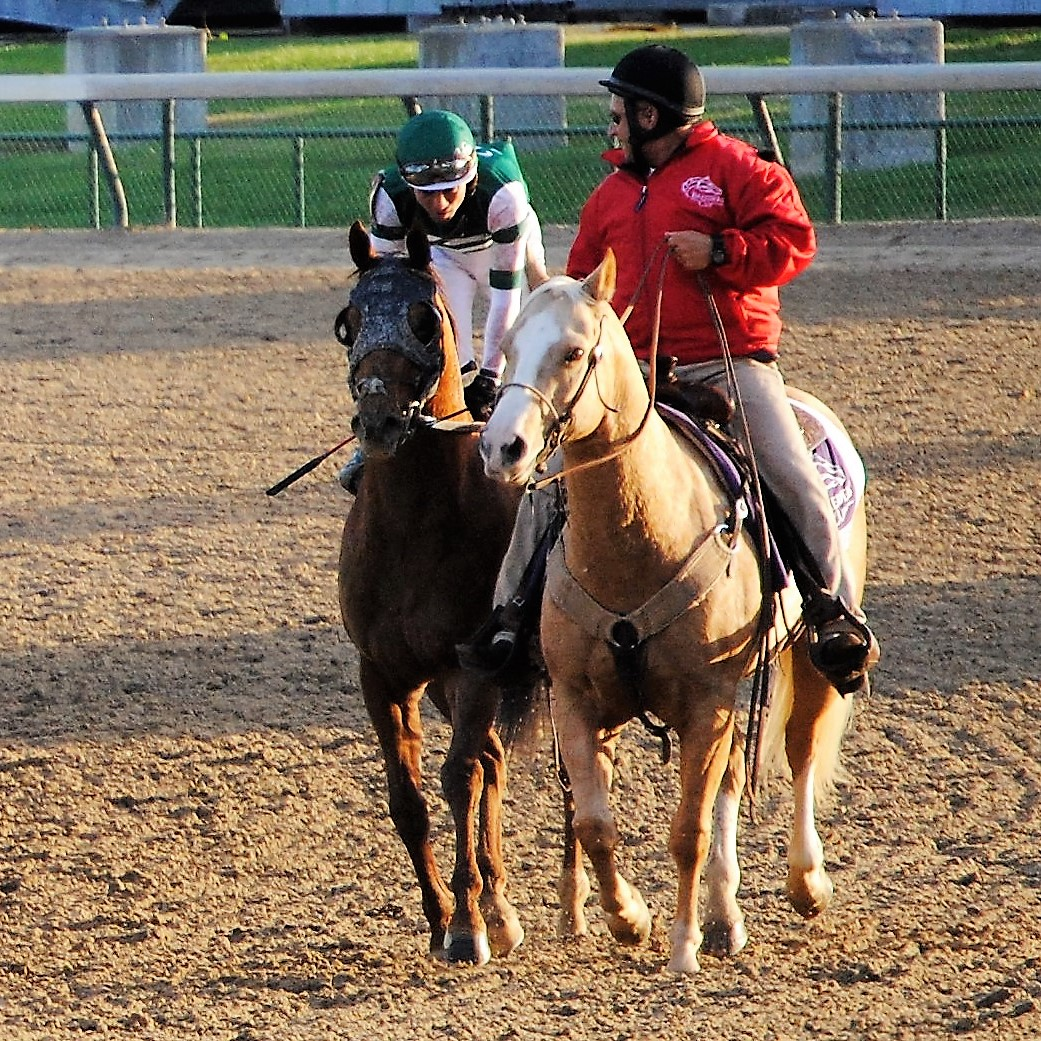
Accelerate returning to the winner's circle

Accelerate's trainer John Sadler earned his first win at the Breeders' Cup in 45 attempts spread out over 30 years. "I'm thrilled", said Sadler. "In order to get the big one, you couldn't ask for a better day."

With the win, Accelerate solidified his chances to win the Eclipse Award for Champion Older Male Dirt Horse, and sparked a debate in the Horse of the Year category. Accelerate won five Grade I races over the year, compared to four such wins for Justify. Justify's wins included the American Triple Crown, while Accelerate became the first horse to win the Santa Anita Handicap, Gold Cup at Santa Anita, Pacific Classic and Awesome Again, in addition to the Breeders' Cup Classic. "This horse (Accelerate) is special. He's showed up every time. He's danced every dance. He's been solid", said his owner Kosta Hronis. "This is Horse of the Year. It's a body of work, and what he has done in the last 12 months, I think he's well deserved to be of that honor. There's no doubt."

Antonio Sano was equally proud of his trainee, Gunnevera. "He ran second and had lost a couple lengths at the start", he pointed out. "They sandwiched my horse. Every time we are closer and closer to winning a grade 1. He's going to race in 2019 and will point to the Pegasus." That race is also under consideration for Accelerate, who will then head off to stud.

== Results ==
Finish	Program Number	Horse	Jockey	Trainer	Odds	Margin	Winnings
1	14	Accelerate	Joel Rosario	John Sadler	2.70		$3,300,000
2	4	Gunnevera	Irad Ortiz Jr.	Antonio Sano	30.80	1 length	$1,020,000
3	1	Thunder Snow (IRE)	Christophe Soumillon	Saeed bin Suroor	14.50	1 3/4 lengths	$540,000
4	10	Yoshida (JPN)	José Ortiz	William Mott	14.50	1 3/4 lengths	$300,000
5	9	Mendelssohn	Ryan Moore	Aidan O'Brien	13.30	4 lengths	$180,000
6	5	Lone Sailor	James Graham	Thomas Amoss	90.90	5 1/2 lengths	$60,000
7	7	West Coast	John Velazquez	Bob Baffert	6.60	7 1/4 lengths	$60,000
8	13	Discreet Lover	Manuel Franco	Uriah St. Lewis	53.30	7 1/2 lengths	$60,000
9	12	Axelrod	Joe Bravo	Michael McCarthy	51.70	8 lengths	
10	8	Pavel	Mario Gutierrez	Doug O'Neill	39.70	9 lengths	
11	11	Mind Your Biscuits	Tyler Gaffalione	Chad Summers	9.10	30 3/4 lengths	
12	6	McKinzie	Mike Smith	Bob Baffert	3.90	31 lengths	
13	3	Catholic Boy	Javier Castellano	Jonathan Thomas	5.10	34 3/4 lengths	
14	2	Roaring Lion	Oisin Murphy	John Gosden	19.70	60 1/4 lengths	

Times: 1/4 – 0:22.68; 1/2 – 0:46.46; 3/4 – 1:10.61; mile – 1:35.90; final – 2:02.93.
Fractional Splits: (:22.68) (:23.78) (:24.15) (:25.29) (:27.03)

Source: Equibase Chart

== Payout ==
Payout Schedule:

Program Number	Horse	Win	Place	Show
14	Accelerate	7.40	6.00	4.40
4	Gunnevera		21.80	11.80
1	Thunder Snow (IRE)			8.00

- $1 Exacta (14–4) Paid $130.80
- $1 Trifecta (14–4–1) Paid $1,613.10
- $1 Superfecta (14–4–1–10) Paid $16,179.10
