= 2018 Belmont Stakes =

American horse race

150th Belmont Stakes
- Belmont Stakes
- Grade I stakes race
- "The Test of the Champion"
- Location: Belmont Park; Elmont, New York, United States
- Date: June 9, 2018
- Distance: 1 1/2 mi (12 furlongs; 2,414 m)
- Winning horse: Justify
- Winning time: 2:28.18
- Final odds: 0.80 (to 1)
- Jockey: Mike Smith
- Trainer: Bob Baffert
- Owner: China Horse Club, Head of Plains Partners, Starlight Racing & WinStar Farm
- Conditions: Fast
- Surface: Dirt
- Attendance: 90,327

The 2018 Belmont Stakes was the 150th running of the Belmont Stakes and the 107th time the event took place at Belmont Park. The 1 1/2-mile (2,400 m) race, known as the "test of the champion", is the final leg in the American Triple Crown. It is a Grade I stakes race with a purse of $1.5 million, open to three-year-old Thoroughbreds. The race took place on June 9, 2018, and was broadcast on NBC starting at 4 p.m. EDT. Justify won the race with a time of 2:28.18, becoming the thirteenth American Triple Crown winner.

== Field ==
Entries for the Belmont were taken on June 5, followed by the post position draw. Justify was attempting to become the first horse to win the American Triple Crown since American Pharoah did so in 2015. He faced horses that he had previously beaten in the Kentucky Derby or Preakness, plus a few "new shooters" who did not compete in those races. His major competitors included:

- Bravazo – sixth in the Kentucky Derby, second in the Preakness, winner of the Risen Star Stakes
- Tenfold – third in the Preakness
- Hofburg – seventh in the Kentucky Derby
- Vino Rosso – ninth in the Kentucky Derby, winner of the Wood Memorial
- Noble Indy – 17th in the Kentucky Derby, winner of the Louisiana Derby
- Free Drop Billy – 16th in the Kentucky Derby, winner of the Breeders' Futurity
- Gronkowski – a multiple stakes winner in Europe (and named after Rob Gronkowski, who became a part-owner)
- Blended Citizen – winner of the Peter Pan Stakes

Audible, who finished third in the Kentucky Derby and would have been one of Justify's top competitors in the Belmont, was not considered for the race. Although the two colts have different trainers, they share common ownership (WinStar Farm, China Horse Club, Starlight Racing and Head of Plains Partners), leading some to conclude that the owners did not want to increase the pressure on Justify in his Triple Crown bid.

== Race description ==
The 2018 Belmont Stakes was run on June 9 over a fast track before a sold-out crowd of 90,327. The New York Racing Association had decided to cap admission for the race after logistical difficulties at the 2014 event. The on-track handle, or total amount bet on the race, was $16,159,584, up from 2017 but somewhat less than bet in 2014 and 2015 – the last two Belmonts where the Triple Crown was on the line. The all-source handle for the race was $72,702,815, up sharply from 2017 but down compared to the record set in 2014. The race was broadcast by NBC.

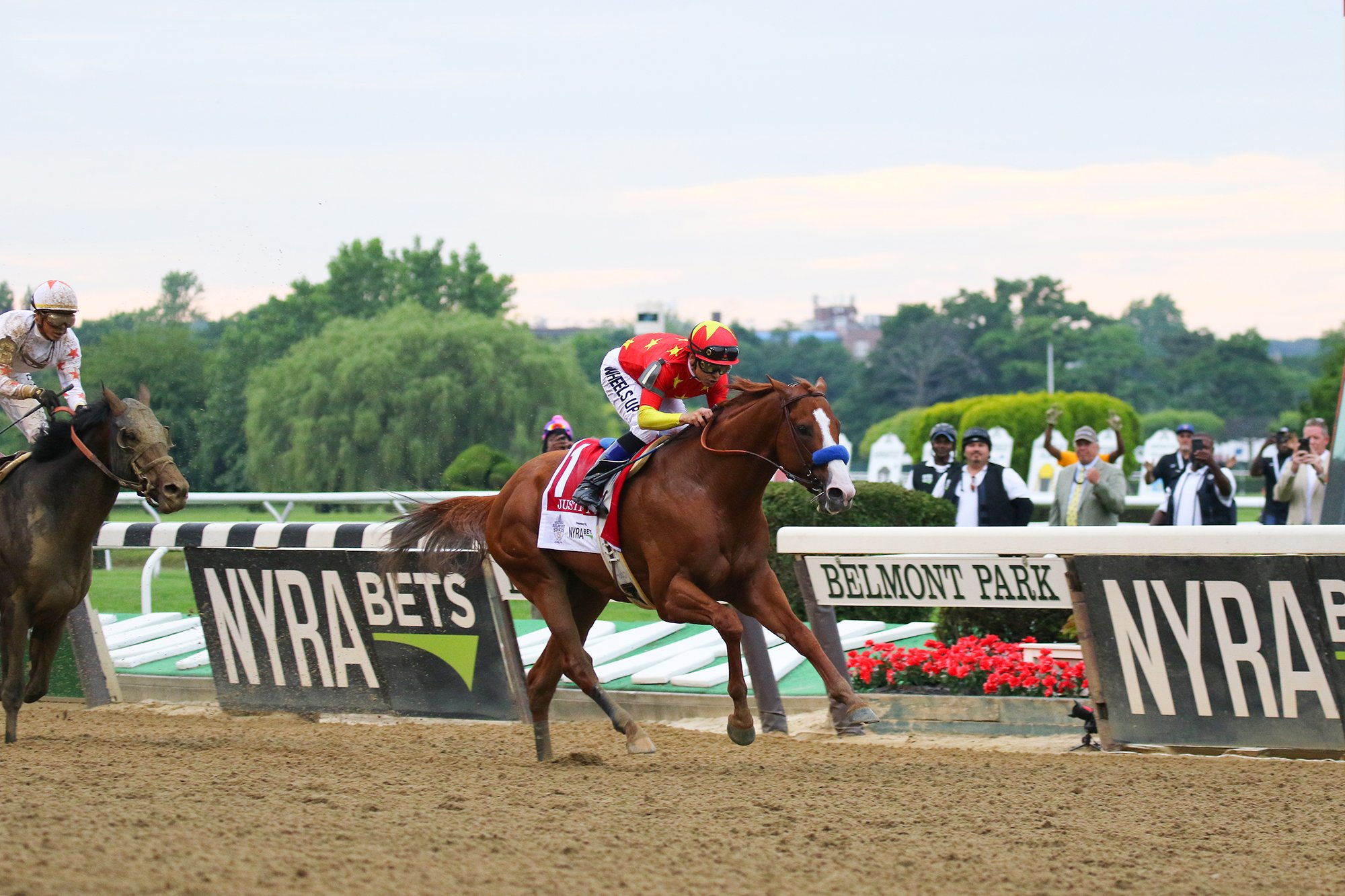
Justify wins the Belmont Stakes to become the 13th Triple Crown winner.

Having drawn post position one, Justify risked getting trapped on the rail if he started poorly. Instead, he broke well and jockey Mike Smith sent him to the lead with a quick opening quarter of 23.37. Meanwhile, the eventual runner-up Gronkowski started poorly and trailed the field. Justify then slowed down the pace as they moved around the first turn, leading by two lengths over Restoring Hope. None of the other jockeys chose to challenge Justify for the lead, so he settled into an easy stride down the backstretch, completing the opening mile in 1:38.09. Around the far turn, Restoring Hope started to tire while Vino Rosso mounted a drive to move into second place. From farther back, Gronkowski and Hofburg also started closing rapidly. Despite drifting out slightly in the stretch, Justify held off the challengers to win by 1 3/4 lengths over Gronkowski with Hofburg another 1 3/4 lengths back in third. Justify completed the mile and a half in 2:28.18.

And they're into the stretch, and Justify comes roaring home to a raucous Belmont Park with one furlong to run. Gronokowsi and Hofburg try to run him down, Vino Rosso is fourth. A sixteenth to go. Justify is still there. Justify from Gronkowski – he's just perfect. And now he's just immortal! Justify is the 13th Triple Crown winner.

— Larry Collmus, NBC

The win made Justify the 13th winner of the American Triple Crown, and just the second horse to accomplish the feat while still undefeated, joining 1977 winner Seattle Slew. It was the second Triple Crown win for Baffert, who also trained American Pharoah.

== Results ==
Finish	PP	Horse	Jockey	Trainer	Morning line odds	Final odds	Margin (lengths)	Winnings
1	1	Justify	Mike E. Smith	Bob Baffert	4-5	0.80		$800,000
2	6	Gronkowski	José Ortiz	Chad Brown	12-1	24.75	1 3/4	$280,000
3	4	Hofburg	Irad Ortiz Jr.	Bill Mott	9-2	5.20	3 1/2	$150,000
4	8	Vino Rosso	John Velazquez	Todd Pletcher	8-1	7.50	3 3/4	$100,000
5	7	Tenfold	Ricardo Santana Jr.	Steve Asmussen	12-1	10.70	7 1/4	$60,000
6	3	Bravazo	Luis Saez	D. Wayne Lukas	8-1	8.00	8 1/2	$45,000
7	2	Free Drop Billy	Robby Albarado	Dale Romans	30-1	32.25	9 1/2	$35,000
8	5	Restoring Hope	Florent Geroux	Bob Baffert	30-1	37.50	38 3/4	$30,000
9	10	Blended Citizen	Kyle Frey	Doug O'Neill	15-1	23.90	51 3/4	
10	9	Noble Indy	Javier Castellano	Todd Pletcher	30-1	23.80	54	

Track: Fast

Times: 1/4 mile – 23.37; 1/2 mile – 48.11; 3/4 mile – 1:13.21; mile – 1:38.09; 1 1/4 miles – 2:02.90; final – 2:28.18.
Splits for each quarter-mile: (23.37) (24.74) (25.10) (24.88) (24.81) (25.28)

Source: Equibase Chart

=== Payouts ===
Program number	Horse name	Win	Place	Show
1	Justify	$3.60	$3.50	$2.80
6	Gronkowski	–	$13.80	$7.00
4	Hofburg	–	–	$3.70

- $1 Exacta: (1-6) $44.50
- $1 Trifecta: (1-6-4) $229.74
- $1 Superfecta: (1-6-4-8) $1,051.50

Source: Equibase chart
