= Burradon Stakes =

Flat horse race in Britain

- Class: Listed
- Location: Newcastle Racecourse; Newcastle upon Tyne, England
- Race type: Flat / Thoroughbred
- Sponsor: BetMGM
- Website: Newcastle

Race information
- Distance: 1m 5y (1,614 metres)
- Surface: Tapeta
- Track: Straight
- Qualification: Three-year-olds
- Weight: 9 st 4 lb Allowances; 5 lb for fillies Penalties; 5 lb for Group race winners * 3 lb for Listed winners * * since 31 August last year
- Purse: £100,000 (2025); 1st: £56,710

Burradon Conditions Stakes
2026
Timeforshowcasing	Padraig Dawn	Andab

Previous years
2025
Glittering Legend	Bowmark	Royal Playwright
2024
Cuban Tiger	Sayedaty Sadaty	Orne
2023
Dear My Friend	Flight Plan	Galeron
2022
Checkandchallenge	Dubai Poet	Imperial Fighter
2021
Megallan	Legion Of Honour	Final Voyage

2020-2017
2019
Fox Power	Daarik	Bayroot
2018
Gronkowski	Iconic Sunset	Dark Acclaim
2017
Forest Ranger	Syphax	Utmost

The Burradon Stakes is a Listed flat horse race in Great Britain open to three-year-old horses. It is run at Newcastle over a distance of 1 mile and 5 yards (1,614 metres), and it is scheduled to take place each year in March or April at the course's Good Friday meeting.

The race was first run in 2017 as a conditions race and was named after the nearby village of Burradon. It was upgraded to Listed status from the 2018 running, effectively replacing the International Trial in the calendar. In 2018 it also became part of the Road to the Kentucky Derby series through which horses earn points to qualify for a place in the Kentucky Derby. The Burradon Stakes was the final race of the European leg of the series and carried the most qualifying points of any of the European races. It was replaced from the 2019 Road to the Kentucky Derby series by the Cardinal Stakes at Chelmsford City.

== Winners ==
Year	Winner	Jockey	Trainer	Time
2017	Forest Ranger	Tony Hamilton	Richard Fahey	1:39.42
2018	Gronkowski	Jamie Spencer	Jeremy Noseda	1:37.49
2019	Fox Power	Silvestre de Sousa	Richard Hannon Jr.	1:39.03
	no race 2020 (Note: The 2020 running was cancelled because of the COVID-19 pandemic in the United Kingdom)
2021	Megallan	Robert Havlin	John & Thady Gosden	1:40.20
2022	Checkandchallenge	Daniel Tudhope	William Knight	1:38.68
2023	Dear My Friend	James Doyle	Charlie Johnston	1:39.49
2024	Cuban Tiger	Clifford Lee	Karl Burke	1:38.39
2025	Glittering Legend (Note: The 2025 winner Glittering Legend was later exported to Hong Kong)	Daniel Muscutt	James Fanshawe	1:37.66
2026	Timeforshowcasing	Callum Shepherd	Charlie Johnston	1:39.55

== See also ==
- Horse racing in Great Britain
- List of British flat horse races
