= Accelerate (horse) =

American-bred Thoroughbred racehorse

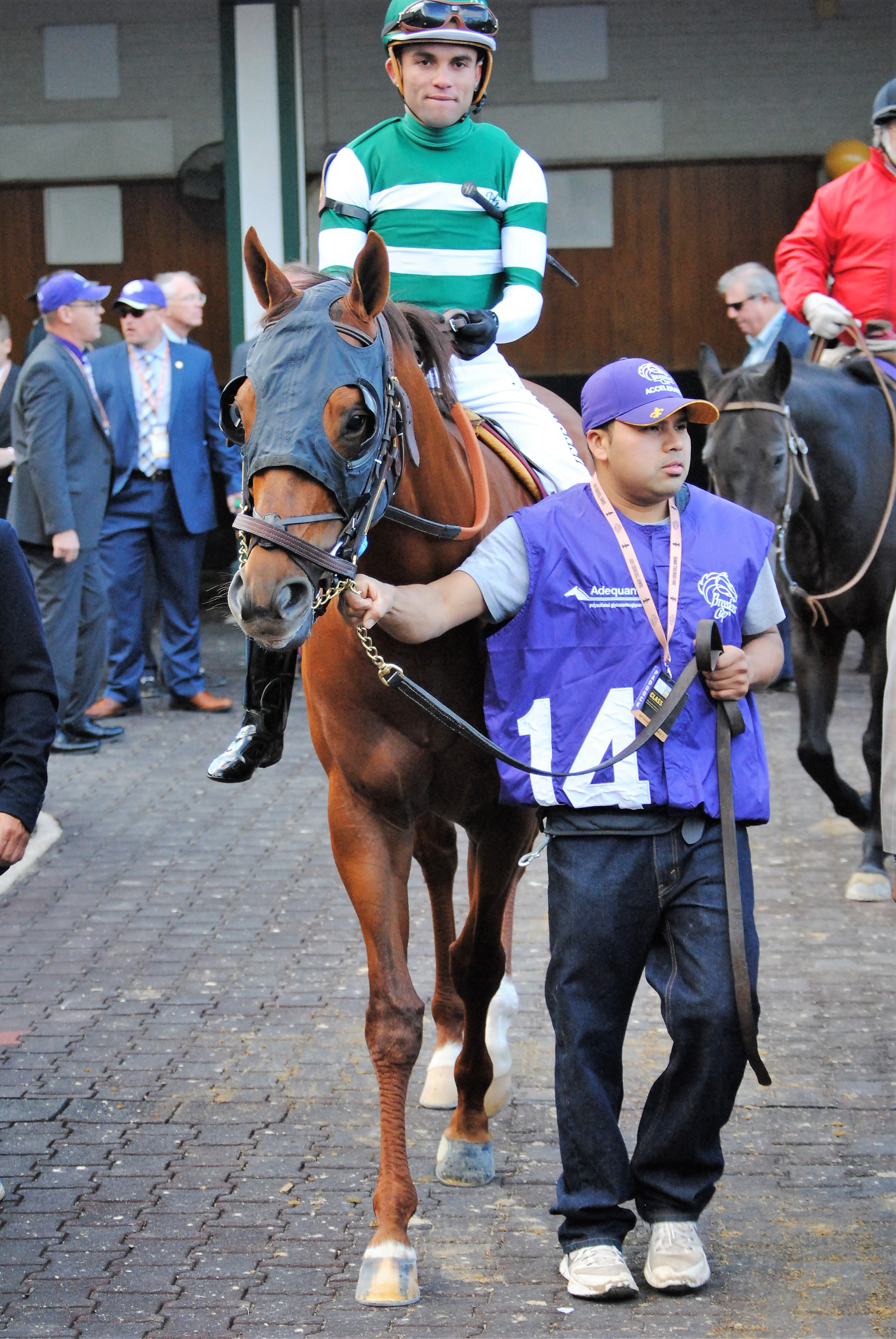
- Accelerate at the 2018 Breeders' Cup
- Sire: Lookin at Lucky
- Grandsire: Smart Strike
- Dam: Issues
- Damsire: Awesome Again
- Sex: Stallion
- Foaled: May 10, 2013
- Country: United States
- Color: Chestnut
- Breeder: Mike Abraham
- Owner: Hronis Racing (Kosta & Pete Hronis)
- Trainer: John W. Sadler
- Record: 23: 10-5-6
- Earnings: US$ $6,692,480

Major wins
- Shared Belief Stakes (2016); Los Alamitos Derby (2016); San Diego Handicap (2017); San Pasqual Stakes (2018); Santa Anita Handicap (2018); Gold Cup at Santa Anita Stakes (2018); Pacific Classic Stakes (2018); Awesome Again Stakes (2018) Breeders' Cup wins: Breeders' Cup Classic (2018)

Awards
- American Champion Older Dirt Male Horse (2018)

Accelerate (foaled May 10, 2013) is a retired American Thoroughbred racehorse, best known for winning the 2018 Breeders' Cup Classic. He established his reputation when defeating champion Arrogate in the 2017 GII San Diego Handicap, and prior to his Breeders' Cup success won the GI Santa Anita Handicap, GI Gold Cup at Santa Anita Stakes, GI Pacific Classic Stakes, and the GI Awesome Again Stakes. He is one of three horses from the 2013 foal crop to win the Breeders' Cup Classic, along with Arrogate in 2016, and Gun Runner in 2017.

== Background ==
Accelerate is a chestnut stallion with a small white star, a white sock on his left hind leg and two coronet bands, one on his right hind leg and another on his right fore.

Accelerate was bred in Kentucky by Mike Abraham. He was from the second crop of foals sired by Lookin at Lucky, who won the 2010 Preakness Stakes and four other Grade I races. Accelerate's dam, Issue, was sired by Breeders' Cup Classic winner Awesome Again and descends on the female side from Kentucky Broodmare of the Year Smartaire.

He was purchased as hip #1162 at the 2014 Keeneland September Yearling Sale for $380,000 by Hronis Racing, the nom de course for Kosta and Pete Hronis.

== Racing career ==
=== 2016: 3-year-old season ===
Accelerate did not race until April of his 3-year-old season. He made his debut in a 6-furlong Maiden Special Weight on April 17 at Los Alamitos Race Course, where he finished 2nd, beaten by half a length by Westbrook, but finishing a neck ahead of future champion Arrogate. He finished 4th in his next race, a 6 1/2-furlong Maiden Special Weight at Santa Anita Park on May 22. He then finished 3rd in a 7-furlong Maiden Special Weight at Santa Anita Park on June 18. He broke his maiden in his fourth try in a mile Maiden Special Weight at Del Mar on July 28, where he defeated future graded-stakes winner Curlin Road by 8 3/4 lengths.

He made his next start in the inaugural running of the mile Shared Belief Stakes on August 26 at Del Mar. He ran in third position most of the race, before taking the lead on the final turn and holding off Taman Guard and Semper Fortis to prevail by half a length.

After his win, he was the favorite in the 1 1/8-mile GII Los Alamitos Derby. Sitting in fourth position and wide throughout the race, he made a move on the final turn to challenge Blackjackcat, as Semper Fortis took the advantage on the rail. Semper Fortis was in the lead for most of the long homestretch, but Accelerate gradually wore him down to win by a head. Accelerate had to survive a 13-minute stewards' inquiry for bumping Blackjackcat near the wire.

Accelerate trained for his first attempt in a grade I race, the Breeders' Cup Dirt Mile on November 4 at Santa Anita. He finished a rallying third, only a neck behind future Horse of the Year, Gun Runner, and 3 1/2 lengths behind the winner, Tamarkuz.

=== 2017: 4-year-old season ===
Accelerate started his 4-year-old season in the GII San Pasqual Stakes on January 1 at Santa Anita Park, where he finished second on a sloppy track, 1 1/4 lengths behind the favorite, Midnight Storm.

He then finished third in the GII San Antonio Stakes on February 4, behind GI winners Los Alamitos Futurity winner Mor Spirit and Jockey Club Gold Cup winner Hoppertunity.

His next planned start was the GII Oaklawn Handicap, but he was forced to scratch when he spiked a fever after arriving at Oaklawn Park. He was then given a short break, and returned in a 1-mile Allowance Optional Claiming on May 5, at Santa Anita Park. He finished 2nd, beaten 1 1/4 lengths by multiple graded-stakes winner Danzing Candy.

Accelerate's next start came in the 1 1/16 mile GIII Precisionist Stakes, on June 24 at Santa Anita Park He finished third, 1 3/4 lengths behind stakes-winner Cat Burglar, and 15 1/4 lengths behind the winner, Collected.

He then ran in the 1 1/16 mile GII San Diego Handicap on July 22, where he wore blinkers for the first time and had a rider change from regular rider Tyler Baze to Victor Espinoza. He would face 2016 American Champion Three-Year-Old Male Horse Arrogate, who had not lost a race since his debut. Accelerate was driven to the lead by Espinoza, and he set fractions of 23.49 for a quarter of a mile, 47.07 for half a mile, and 1:11.39 for three-fourths of a mile, while steadily separating himself from his competition. He had a 7-length lead as he entered the homestretch, and widened the margin to 8 1/2 lengths as he passed the wire, as Arrogate finished far back in fourth. His trainer, John Sadler, said after the race: "He trained really well Sunday up at Santa Anita and showed a lot of pop when Victor worked him from the gate, and they kept telling me it was $50,000 for second. You don't want to concede anything, but I'm surprised we won, because Arrogate is the best horse in the world."

On July 29, Sadler announced that Accelerate would run for the first time at the distance of a mile and a quarter, and would have a rematch with Arrogate in the GI Pacific Classic Stakes on August 19 at Del Mar Racetrack. Sadler said: "He likes the track, and if there was ever a time to try a mile and a quarter it's now." Accelerate broke well and ran in second position most of the race behind Collected, as Arrogate stalked in third. Accelerate challenged Collected on the turn for home, but flattened out in the stretch to finish third, beaten 4 lengths.

Accelerate's next start would be a second try at the GI Breeders' Cup Dirt Mile, on November 3 at Del Mar. Accelerate was never comfortable and did not fire to finish ninth in a field of ten, the worst finish of his fourteen race career. He came out of the race with a sore foot, that ended up being a quarter crack.

He then finished the year with a run in the GII San Antonio Stakes, which he ran in for the second time that year, as it was rescheduled to be run at the end of December to try to attract horses to prep in it for the Pegasus World Cup. He settled in third position and stalked throughout the race, and ran evenly in the stretch to hold second place, beaten 3 1/4 lengths by multiple-graded stakes winner Giant Expectations.

=== 2018: 5-year-old season ===
Accelerate started his 5-year-old season in the GII San Pasqual Stakes on February 3. Accelerate broke awkwardly, was jostled slightly between horses, and settled at the back of the pack. On the backstretch, Espinoza tried to move him through an opening on the rail to press a slow pace set by Mubtaahij. Mubtaahij, ridden by Drayden Van Dyke, moved onto the rail and forced Accelerate to be checked back. Espinoza had to wait behind horses until the head of the stretch, when the rail opened for him again. Accelerate moved through the opening, took the lead and pulled away to win by 1 3/4 lengths with a time of 1:50.58 for 1 1/16 miles.

It was then announced that Accelerate would target the 1 1/4-mile GI Santa Anita Handicap on March 11 at Santa Anita. His owner, Kosta Hronis, was pleased about the patience the horse had shown in his last race, and thought that he had shown enough maturity to try a mile and a quarter again. Accelerate broke well on the sloppy track, and stalked Mubtaahij throughout much of the race. He took the lead on the far turn, and pulled away in the stretch to win by 5 1/2 lengths over Mubtaahij, with a time of 2:01.83. It was the first time trainer John Sadler had won the race.

He next ran in the 1 1/8-mile GII Oaklawn Handicap on April 13. He broke well, and moved up to third, with Malibu Stakes and Triple Bend Handicap winner City of Light sitting directly behind him. On the far turn, Accelerate moved up to take the lead, under strong driving from Espinoza, while City of Light moved up easily without asking from his jockey, Drayden Van Dyke. City of Light pulled a length in front, but Accelerate continued to battle from the inside to close the margin to a neck. Sadler said after the race: "First time out of town, and I thought he ran a great race, I was pleased. Remember, it was a handicap, and we were giving away the weight."

Accelerate and City of Light would have a rematch on May 27 in the GI 1 1/4-mile Gold Cup at Santa Anita. Accelerate broke well and stalked in third position as Dr. Dorr lead with City of Light in second, before Accelerate made his move turning for home and opened up a 4 1/4-length lead as he crossed the wire in front. He had a final time of 2:01.38.

He was entered to defend his title in the GII San Diego Handicap on July 21 at Del Mar, but he was scratched since John Sadler did not want to run his stablemate, Catalina Cruiser, and Accelerate in the same race.

Accelerate was then trained up to the GI Pacific Classic on August 18 at Del Mar. He drew post 5 with a new rider in Joel Rosario who would replace the injured Victor Espinoza. He was bumped at the start before moving up to stalk the pace, which was set by Roman Rosso, he stayed in third until he made a strong move around the far turn and drew off in the stretch to win by 12 1/2 lengths—a record margin in the 1 1/4-mile event. The final time was 2:01.83. It was announced on August 29 that Accelerate would stand at Lane's End Farm upon retirement.

His next start would be the GI 1 1/8-mile Awesome Again Stakes on September 29, where he would meet the returning West Coast. Accelerate was reluctant to load and hopped out of the gate to be last of six horses. He was 4-wide on the first turn before moving up to 3rd nearing the final turn. He was challenged by Isotherm before he took the lead on the turn and won by 2 1/4 lengths over West Coast with a final time of 1:50.38.

Then Accelerate shipped outside of California for the second time in his career to run in the GI 1 1/4 Breeders' Cup Classic on November 3 at Churchill Downs. Accelerate drew post fourteen in a fourteen-horse field. He was again reluctant to load and broke in 5th position. He stayed in fifth until the final turn when he challenged Mendelssohn for the lead and took it when they entered the stretch. He held off a challenge from Thunder Snow and a fast closing-Gunnevera to win by 1 length, with a final time of 2:02.93.

Accelerate arrived at Lane's End Farm on November 4 for a brief break and to be available for inspection by breeders before training for his final start in the GI 1 1/8-mile Pegasus World Cup on January 26. His stud fee was set for $20,000 on November 7

Accelerate began his preparations for his final start on December 8.

=== 2019: 6-year-old season and retirement ===
Accelerate was voted the Eclipse Award for 2018 Champion Older Male.

On January 26, he finished 3rd on a sloppy track in the GI Pegasus World Cup. This was his final career start before embarking on a new career as a stallion at Lane's End Farm in Versailles, Kentucky. After standing five seasons at stud, Accelerate failed to produce an impressive foal and was pensioned from stallion duty, relocating to the Kentucky Horse Park in Lexington to reside at the Hall of Champions.

== Pedigree ==
Pedigree of Accelerate, chestnut horse, 2013
Sire Lookin at Lucky 2007	Smart Strike (CAN); 1991	Mr. Prospector	Raise a Native
Sire Lookin at Lucky 2007	Smart Strike (CAN); 1991	Mr. Prospector	Gold Digger
Sire Lookin at Lucky 2007	Smart Strike (CAN); 1991	Classy 'n Smart (CAN)	Smarten
Sire Lookin at Lucky 2007	Smart Strike (CAN); 1991	Classy 'n Smart (CAN)	No Class (CAN)
Sire Lookin at Lucky 2007	Private Feeling; 1999	Belong to Me	Danzig
Sire Lookin at Lucky 2007	Private Feeling; 1999	Belong to Me	Belonging
Sire Lookin at Lucky 2007	Private Feeling; 1999	Regal Feeling	Clever Trick
Sire Lookin at Lucky 2007	Private Feeling; 1999	Regal Feeling	Sharp Belle
Dam Issues 2003	Awesome Again (CAN); 1994	Deputy Minister (CAN)	Vice Regent (CAN)
Dam Issues 2003	Awesome Again (CAN); 1994	Deputy Minister (CAN)	Mint Copy (CAN)
Dam Issues 2003	Awesome Again (CAN); 1994	Primal Force	Blushing Groom (FR)
Dam Issues 2003	Awesome Again (CAN); 1994	Primal Force	Prime Prospect
Dam Issues 2003	Darlin Echo; 1996	Eastern Echo	Damascus
Dam Issues 2003	Darlin Echo; 1996	Eastern Echo	Wild Applause
Dam Issues 2003	Darlin Echo; 1996	Darlin Lindy	Cox's Ridge
Dam Issues 2003	Darlin Echo; 1996	Darlin Lindy	Smart Darlin, out of Smartaire (family: A13)

Accelerate is inbred 3S x 5D to Mr. Prospector, meaning that stallion appears in the third generation of the sire's side of his pedigree, and in the fifth generation of the dam's side. Accelerate is also inbred 5S x 5D to Smartaire, and is 5S x 5D x 5D to Northern Dancer.
