= Thunder Snow =

Thoroughbred racehorse

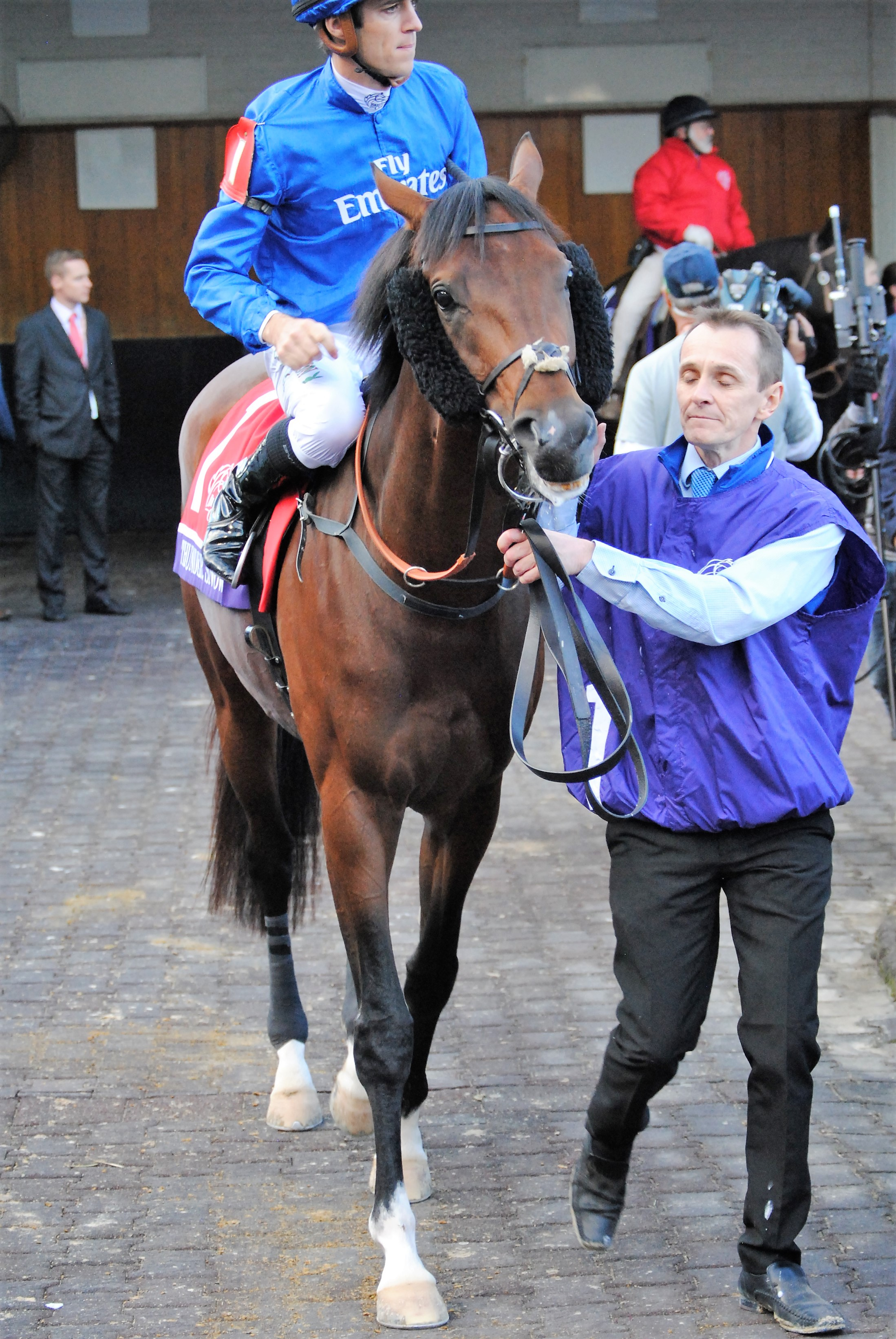
- Thunder Snow at the 2018 Breeders' Cup
- Sire: Helmet
- Grandsire: Exceed and Excel
- Dam: Eastern Joy
- Damsire: Dubai Destination
- Sex: Colt
- Foaled: 24 March 2014
- Country: Ireland
- Colour: Bay
- Breeder: Darley Stud
- Owner: Godolphin
- Trainer: Saeed bin Suroor
- Record: 24: 8-7-4
- Earnings: £12,671,800

Major wins
- Critérium International (2016); UAE 2000 Guineas (2017); UAE Derby (2017); Prix Jean Prat (2017); Al Maktoum Challenge, Round 2 (2018); Dubai World Cup (2018, 2019)

Awards
- Top-rated British two-year-old (2016)

Thunder Snow (foaled 24 March 2014) is an Irish-bred Thoroughbred racehorse, the only two-time winner of the Dubai World Cup (2018, 2019). In 2016 he won a minor race on his track debut but was then beaten in his next four races although he ran well in defeat to finish second in the Vintage Stakes and the Champagne Stakes and fourth in the Dewhurst Stakes. He produced his best performance of 2016 on his final start of the year when he was sent to France and recorded an emphatic victory in the Critérium International. At the end of the year he was rated the best two-year-old trained in Britain.

In early 2017 he was campaigned in Dubai and won the UAE 2000 Guineas and the UAE Derby before being shipped to the United States to contest the Kentucky Derby but effectively refused to race in the American contest. On his return to Europe he finished second in the Irish 2000 Guineas and third in the St James's Palace Stakes before winning the Prix Jean Prat. As a four-year-old he won the Al Maktoum Challenge, Round 2 before recording his biggest success in the Dubai World Cup. In the following year, he became the first horse to win the Dubai World Cup for a second time.

== Background ==
Thunder Snow is a "tall, muscular, graceful" bay colt bred in Ireland by Sheikh Mohammed's Darley Stud and owned by the Sheikh's Godolphin Racing organisation. He is trained by Saeed bin Suroor who manages the preparation of the Godolphin horses in England during the summer and in Dubai in the winter months.

The colt is the most successful of the first crop of foals sired by the Australian stallion Helmet, who won the Sires' Produce Stakes 1400m, Champagne Stakes 1600m (ATC) and Caulfield Guineas 1600m. Thunder Snow's dam Eastern Joy was beaten in her only race but as a broodmare she had produced three other winners namely Ihtimal (Sweet Solera Stakes, UAE 1000 Guineas, UAE Oaks), First Victory (Oh So Sharp Stakes) and Always Smile (Hambleton Stakes). Eastern Joy's dam Red Slippers also produced the Prix de Diane winner West Wind and was a half-sister to Balanchine.

== Racing career ==
=== 2016: two-year-old season ===
Thunder Snow made his first racecourse appearance in a six-furlong maiden race at Leicester Racecourse on 31 May. Ridden by James Doyle he started at odds of 4/1 and won "readily" by one and a quarter lengths from Parys Mountain. Doyle was again in the saddle two weeks later when the colt was stepped up in class for the Group 2 Coventry Stakes at Royal Ascot and finished sixth of the eighteen runners behind the Aidan O'Brien-trained favourite Caravaggio. On 23 July at Goodwood Racecourse Thunder Snow started the 13/2 third choice in the betting for the Group 2 Vintage Stakes over seven furlongs. After tracking the leaders he went to the front in the last quarter mile but was overtaken by the O'Brien-trained War Decree 100 yards from the finish and beaten one and three quarter lengths into second place.

On 10 September Thunder Snow started 2/1 second favourite behind Rivet for the Champagne Stakes at Doncaster. He took the lead two furlongs out but was soon joined by the favourite and was beaten a head into second place. The colt was then moved up to Group 1 class to contest Britain's most prestigious race for juveniles, the Dewhurst Stakes, at Newmarket on 8 October. Starting a 16/1 outsider he chased the leaders and stayed on in the closing stages without looking likely to win and came home fourth of the seven runners behind Churchill. Just over three weeks after his run at Newmarket the colt was sent to France for the Group 1 Critérium International over 1400 metres on soft turf and was partnered for the first time by Christophe Soumillon. He was made the 3/1 third choice behind the Irish filly Promise To Be True (winner of the Silver Flash Stakes and runner up in the Prix Marcel Boussac) and his fellow British challenger South Seas (Solario Stakes) with the best-fancied of the French runners being Mate Story (Prix Thomas Bryon). After taking an early lead he settled in second behind the Godolphin pacemaker Bay of Poets before regaining the advantage entering the straight, at which point Soumillon tracked right to race up the stands-side. Thunder Snow went clear of his opponents entering the last 200 metres and won by five lengths despite being eased down by Soumillon in the final strides. After the race Soumillon commented "he was calm and super relaxed. I think he will be even better over a mile and further".

In the official European Classification of two-year-olds for 2016 Thunder Snow was given a rating of 118, making him the best two-year-old trained in Britain and the third-best juvenile in Europe, four pounds behind Churchill and three behind the American filly Lady Aurelia.

=== 2017: three-year-old season ===
==== Dubai ====
In the winter of 2016/7 Thunder Snow was relocated to the United Arab Emirates where he was based at Godolphin's Al Quoz training facility. The colt began the season on the dirt track at Meydan Racecourse on 11 February when he started 6/4 favourite for the Group 3 UAE 2000 Guineas over 1600 metres (one mile), with the best of his rivals appearing to be Capezanno and Cosmo Charlie, both of whom had won on the track as well as the Autumn Stakes winner Best Solution. With Soumillon in the saddle again, Thunder Snow raced in second behind Capezanno before taking the lead at half way and drawing away to win "easily" by five and three quarter lengths from the outsider Bee Jersey.

On 25 March the colt was stepped up in distance to face an international field in the UAE Derby over 1900 metres (nine and a half furlongs). He was made the 11/4 favourite ahead of the Japanese challenger Epicharis, Lancaster Bomber (runner up in the Dewhurst Stakes and the Breeders' Cup Juvenile Turf) from Ireland and the Todd Pletcher-trained Master Plan from the United States. After tracking the leaders he steadily wore down the front-running Epicharis in the straight and won by a short head with Master Plan taking third ahead of Lancaster Bomber. Three days before his win in the UAE Derby Thunder Snow had been nominated for the American Triple Crown races and after his victory Godolphin's bloodstock advisor John Ferguson said "Sheikh Mohammed has told me that [an American campaign] is definitely an option. He was the leading horse in England last year and he won a Group 1 in France. He is very dear to our hearts. One has to be very happy with that". In April it was confirmed that the colt would indeed be aimed at the Kentucky Derby.

==== Kentucky Derby ====
Thunder Snow arrived in the United States on 30 April and spent two days in quarantine before being allowed to canter at Churchill Downs on 2 May. He appeared to cope well with his new surroundings with his regular work rider Daragh O'Donohoe reporting that "his behavior this morning was exceptional... He floated over the track, and I've no faults on him". Starting a 20/1 longshot in the Derby, on a wet, sloppy track with standing water, Thunder Snow broke awkwardly from stall two, and then began bucking and kicking as Soumillon struggled to control him. The colt refused to co-operate or join the race and was pulled up after less than a furlong, his behavior prompting a flurry of jokes on Twitter. The horse suffered no injury and his connections were unable to offer any explanation for his antics.

==== Europe ====
On his return to Europe the colt was matched against Churchill in the Irish 2000 Guineas on 25 May. Starting the 5/1 second favourite he took the lead in the straight but was overtaken by Churchill and beaten two and a half lengths into second place. At Royal Ascot he faced Churchill yet again in the St James's Palace Stakes. He finally finished in front of the Irish colt but was beaten into third by Barney Roy and Lancaster Bomber. For his next race, the colt was sent to France for the Group 1 Prix Jean Prat over 1600 metres at Chantilly Racecourse on 9 July. With Soumillon in the saddle as usual he started second favourite behind the Prix Paul de Moussac winner Trais Fluors with the best fancied of the other three runners being the filly Gold Luck (Prix Vanteaux). Thunder Snow led from the start and was never seriously, challenged, accelerating away from his rivals in the straight and winning by one and a quarter lengths from Trais Fluors.

On 13 August Thunder Snow was back in France and started favourite for the Group 1 Prix Jacques Le Marois over the straight 1600 metre course at Deauville Racecourse. He led until the final strides when he was overtaken and finished third, beaten a short head and a short neck by Al Wukair and Inns of Court. On his only subsequent start in 2017, Thunder Snow stated a 16/1 outsider for the Queen Elizabeth II Stakes at Ascot on 21 October. He was always towards the rear of the fifteen-runner field and finished tailed-off in last place.

In the 2017 World's Best Racehorse Rankings, Thunder Snow was given a rating of 118, making him rated the 90th best horse in the world.

=== 2018: four-year-old season ===
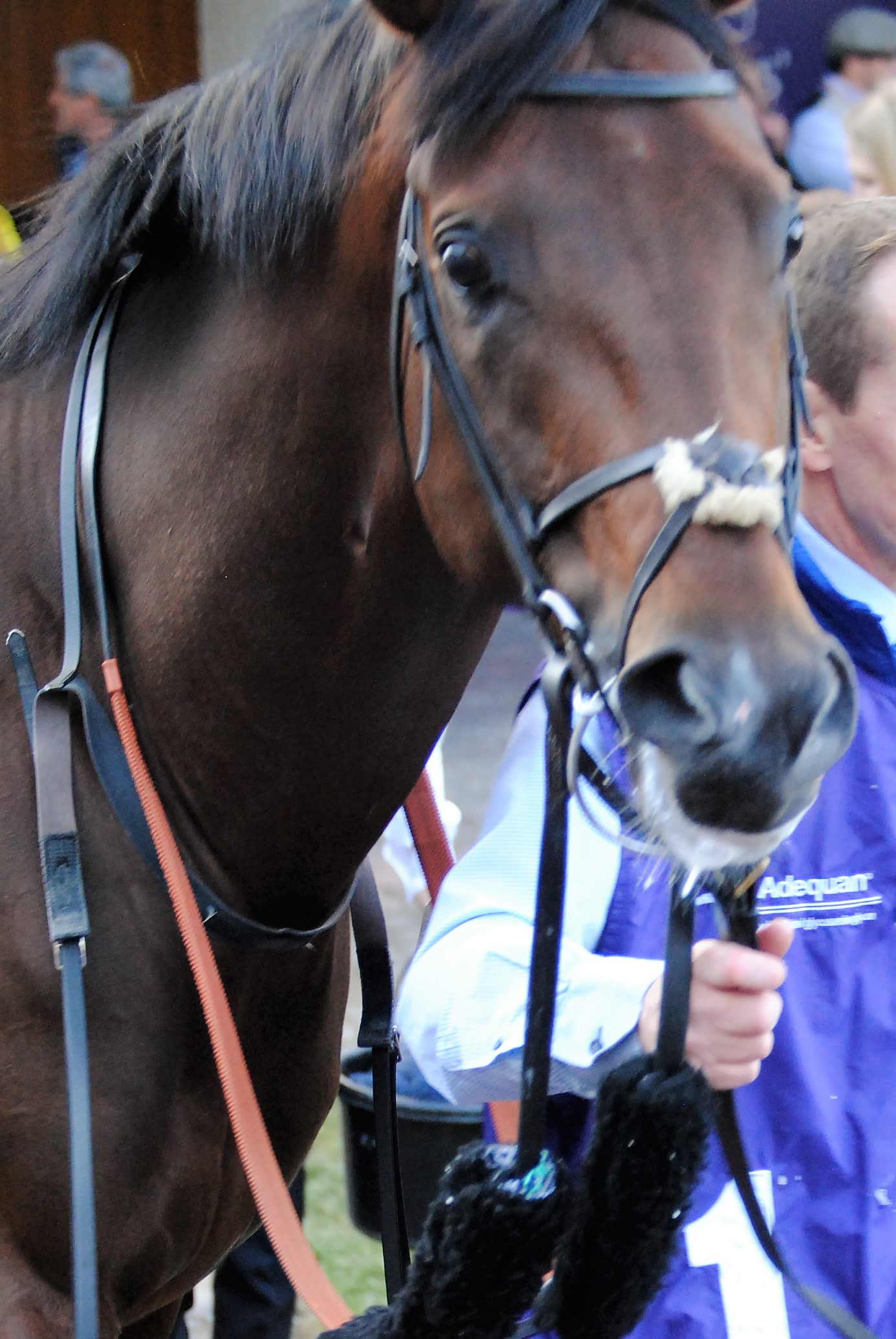
Thunder Snow

As in 2017, Thunder Snow spent the winter in Dubai and began his third campaign by contesting all three rounds of the Al Maktoum Challenge series at Meydan. In the first round over 1600 metres on 11 January he started favourite but came home second behind the eight-year-old gelding Heavy Metal. On 8 February Thunder Snow and Heavy Metal started joint-favourites for the second round over 1900 metres. Thunder Snow raced in mid-division before making a forward move in the straight, and overtook the front-running North America 100 metres from the finish to win by a neck with Heavy Metal four lengths back in third. The colt started odds-on favourite for the third round of the challenge over 2000 metres on 10 March, but was beaten into second by North America, who led from the start.

On 31 March, Thunder Snow was one of ten horses to contest the 23rd running of the Dubai World Cup and started at odds of 8/1. The race featured a strong contingent from the United States comprising West Coast (the 5/4 favourite), Forever Unbridled, Gunnevera, Mubtaahij (Awesome Again Stakes) and Pavel (Smarty Jones Stakes). North America was again in opposition while the other runners included Talismanic and the Japanese entrant Awardee. Despite being drawn on the far outside, Thunder Snow went to the front soon after the start. He set a steady pace before accelerating on the final turn and drew away from his rivals in the straight to come home five and three quarter lengths clear of West Coast, with Mubtaahij a neck away in third place. Christophe Soumillon commented "I never thought I would be making the running, but no horses challenged early in the race. West Coast let me go. I was really cantering on the back straight and when I pushed him he kept finding".

After a break of four and a half months, Thunder Snow returned to European turf for the International Stakes at York Racecourse on 22 August. Starting a 16/1 outsider he led the field into the straight but faded in the last quarter mile and came home last of the eight runners, more than 13 lengths behind the winner Roaring Lion. In September the horse was sent to the United States to contest the Jockey Club Gold Cup over ten furlongs on dirt at Belmont Park. After racing in third place behind Diversify and Mendelssohn he took the lead in the straight but was overtaken in the final strides and beaten a neck by the 46/1 outsider Discreet Lover. On 3 November Thunder Snow was back in the United States for the Breeders' Cup Classic at Churchill Downs on 3 November and started at odds of 12/1 in a fourteen-runner field. After tracking the leaders he moved up on the inside to take second place in the straight and kept on under a hard ride from Christophe Soumillon to finish third behind Accelerate and Gunnevera, beaten less than two lengths by the winner.

In the 2018 World's Best Racehorse Rankings Thunder Snow's rating of 122 made him the 20th best racehorse in world.

=== 2019: five-year-old season ===
Thunder Snow began his 2019 campaign in the third round of the Al Maktoum Challenge at Meyda on 9 March. He started odds-on favourite but after settling in second place he was unable to mount a serious challenge to the front-running Capezzano and was beaten more than nine lengths by the winner. Three weeks later he started 4/1 third choice behind Capezzano and North America when he attempted to repeat his 2018 success in the Dubai World Cup. The other nine runners included Gronkowski, Yoshida (Woodward Stakes), Audible (Florida Derby), Gunnevera, Seeking the Soul and the South Korean champion Dolkong. North America set the pace from Gronkowski with Thunder Snow settled in third and few other horses ever looked likely to mount a serious challenge. Gronkowski got the better of the fading North America exiting the final turn but was soon joined by Thunder Snow on the outside. The pair raced side by side in the final stages with Thunder Snow securing a narrow lead 100 metres from the finish and winning by a nose from his rallying opponent. Commenting on the finish Christophe Soumillon said "I'd like to thank Sheikh Mohammed for putting the post right there... I knew no one was coming to catch us. I was very confident I'd catch Gronkowski, but I didn't want to hit the lead too soon. I wanted to get to the front late. Finally, when I hit it, I let him know he had to go a bit further. He just kept fighting. It was very hard. I was more looking like a Cheltenham jump jockey in the end than an American-style jockey, but you need to get him going and sometimes you need to do something different. Thanks to Thunder Snow, because without him I would not be able to do such things".

In summer, Thunder Snow was sent to the United States again and made his next appearance in the Metropolitan Handicap over one mile at Belmont on 9 June. After struggling to obtain a clear run approaching the final turn he moved into second place behind Mitole in the straight but was unable to make any further progress and lost second spot to McKinzie in the final strides. Thunder Snow did not race again and it was announced in November that he had been retired from racing. Saeed Bin Suroor said "He was a class horse, who was very professional and easy to train. He was extremely tough and always tried his hardest in everything he did. He was one of the best horses to ever race for Godolphin and it was a privilege to train him."

In the 2019 World's Best Racehorse Rankings Thunder Snow was given a rating of 121, making him the 29th best racehorse in the world.

== Pedigree ==
Pedigree of Thunder Snow (IRE), bay colt, 2014
Sire Helmet (AUS) 2008	Exceed and Excel (AUS); 2000	Danehill	Danzig
Sire Helmet (AUS) 2008	Exceed and Excel (AUS); 2000	Danehill	Razyana
Sire Helmet (AUS) 2008	Exceed and Excel (AUS); 2000	Patrona	Lomond
Sire Helmet (AUS) 2008	Exceed and Excel (AUS); 2000	Patrona	Gladiolus
Sire Helmet (AUS) 2008	Accessories (GB); 2003	Singspiel	In the Wings
Sire Helmet (AUS) 2008	Accessories (GB); 2003	Singspiel	Glorious Song
Sire Helmet (AUS) 2008	Accessories (GB); 2003	Anna Matrushka	Mill Reef
Sire Helmet (AUS) 2008	Accessories (GB); 2003	Anna Matrushka	Anna Paola
Dam Eastern Joy (GB) 2006	Dubai Destination (USA); 1999	Kingmambo	Mr. Prospector
Dam Eastern Joy (GB) 2006	Dubai Destination (USA); 1999	Kingmambo	Miesque
Dam Eastern Joy (GB) 2006	Dubai Destination (USA); 1999	Mysterial	Alleged
Dam Eastern Joy (GB) 2006	Dubai Destination (USA); 1999	Mysterial	Mysteries
Dam Eastern Joy (GB) 2006	Red Slippers (USA); 1989	Nureyev	Northern Dancer
Dam Eastern Joy (GB) 2006	Red Slippers (USA); 1989	Nureyev	Special
Dam Eastern Joy (GB) 2006	Red Slippers (USA); 1989	Morning Devotion	Affirmed
Dam Eastern Joy (GB) 2006	Red Slippers (USA); 1989	Morning Devotion	Morning Has Broken (Family 4-k)
