= International Trial =

Discontinued flat horse race in Britain

International Trial
2017
Law And Order	Mr Scaramanga	Eqtiraan

Previous years
2016
Sea of Flames	Ode To Evening	Predilection
2015
Fanciful Angel	Lexington Times	Dancetrack
2014
Bow Creek	Barley Mow	American Hope
2013
Van Der Neer	Luhaif	Unsinkable
2012
Talwar	Prince Alzain	Masterel
2011
Dubawi Gold	Hamlool	Burj Alzain
2010
Lord Zenith	Zaahy	Carnaby Street
2009
Ocean's Minstrel	Deposer	Icesolator
2008
Sharp Nephew	Orientalist Art	Traphalgar
2007
Fares	Champery	Norisan
2006
Close To You	Kingsgate Prince	Zato
2005
Party Boss	Brecon Beacon	Borthwick Girl
2004
Leitrim House	Milk It Mick	Skidmark
2003
Buy The Sport	Membership	Striking Ambition

The International Trial was a Listed flat horse race in Great Britain open to horses aged three years only. It was run over a distance of 1 mile and 1 yard (1,610 metres) at Lingfield Park in April.

The race was first run in 2002, and was awarded Listed status in 2003. In 2018 the Burradon Stakes (Listed), run over the same distance on Newcastle's Good Friday fixture, became a Listed race in its place, effectively moving the race from Lingfield Park.

== Records ==
Leading jockey (4 wins):

- Richard Hughes – Party Boss (2005), Sharp Nephew (2008), Dubawi Gold (2011), Van Der Neer (2013)

Leading trainer (3 wins):

- Brian Meehan – Buy The Sport (2003), Leitrim House (2004), Sharp Nephew (2008)

== Winners ==
Year	Winner	Jockey	Trainer	Time
2002	Castle Gandolfo	Mick Kinane	Aidan O'Brien	1:36.53
2003	Buy The Sport	Darryll Holland	Brian Meehan	1:36.49
2004	Leitrim House	Steve Drowne	Brian Meehan	1:37.16
2005	Party Boss	Richard Hughes	Clive Brittain	1:36.78
2006	Close To You	Ian Mongan	Terry Mills	1:38.01
2007	Fares	Seb Sanders	Clive Brittain	1:38.04
2008	Sharp Nephew	Richard Hughes	Brian Meehan	1:37.24
2009	Ocean's Minstrel	Jerry O'Dwyer	John Ryan	1:36.04
2010	Lord Zenith	Jimmy Fortune	Andrew Balding	1:38.43
2011	Dubawi Gold	Richard Hughes	Richard Hannon Sr.	1:37.26
2012	Talwar	Ryan Moore	Jeremy Noseda	1:36.84
2013	Van Der Neer (Note: The 2013 winner, Van Der Neer, was later renamed Travel Brother)	Richard Hughes	Richard Hannon Sr.	1:35.07
2014	Bow Creek	Joe Fanning	Mark Johnston	1:35.71
2015	Fanciful Angel	Andrea Atzeni	Marco Botti	1:36.69
2016	Sea Of Flames	Silvestre de Sousa	David Elsworth	1:35.97
2017	Law And Order	Martin Harley	James Tate	1:35.37

== See also ==
- Horse racing in Great Britain
- List of British flat horse races
