= Restoring Hope =

American Thoroughbred racehorse

- Sire: Giant's Causeway
- Grandsire: Storm Bird
- Dam: Symbol Of Freedom
- Sex: Colt
- Foaled: May 5, 2015
- Country: United States
- Color: Dark Bay
- Breeder: Gary & Mary West Stables, Inc.
- Owner: Haran Thoroughbreds, LLC
- Trainer: John Haran
- Record: 28: 4-4-5
- Earnings: $288,394

Major wins
- Santa Anita / 3rd Grade II Wood Memorial Stakes
- Last updated on June 8, 2023

Restoring Hope (foaled May 5, 2015) is an American Thoroughbred racehorse who competed in the 2018 Belmont Stakes. He first garnered attention when he won a race at Santa Anita. He later finished third in the Grade II Wood Memorial Stakes, behind Vino Rosso and Enticed. His performance in the Wood Memorial earned him sufficient qualifying points to secure a place in the 2018 Belmont Stakes.

Restoring Hope became a subject of debate after competitors in the 2018 Belmont Stakes accused him of blocking other horses in order to help his stablemate, Justify, who went on to win the Triple Crown. Restoring Hope was trained by Bob Baffert, who also trained Justify.

Mike Repole, who owned two other horses in the race, said "We watched Restoring Hope rush up like he was a quarter horse, make a quick right-hand turn, then turn left, pinned Bravazo on the rail. He looked like a bodyguard making sure nobody got close to Justify."

After the Belmont Stakes, Restoring Hope did not race for half a year, until resurfacing for new trainer Jason Servis. After Servis' indictment, he was moved to W. Bret Calhoun's barn, for whom he made two starts after ten months away from the track. After another ten months without any races, he then raced once for Wayne M. Catalano, was moved to Kelly J. Breen's barn and finally to Ron Moquett. A few starts later, he was claimed by trainer John Haran. As of June 2023, he retired from racing and started his stud career in the 2024 breeding season in Libya at Elbasouni stables.
