= Gronkowski (horse) =

American Thoroughbred racehorse

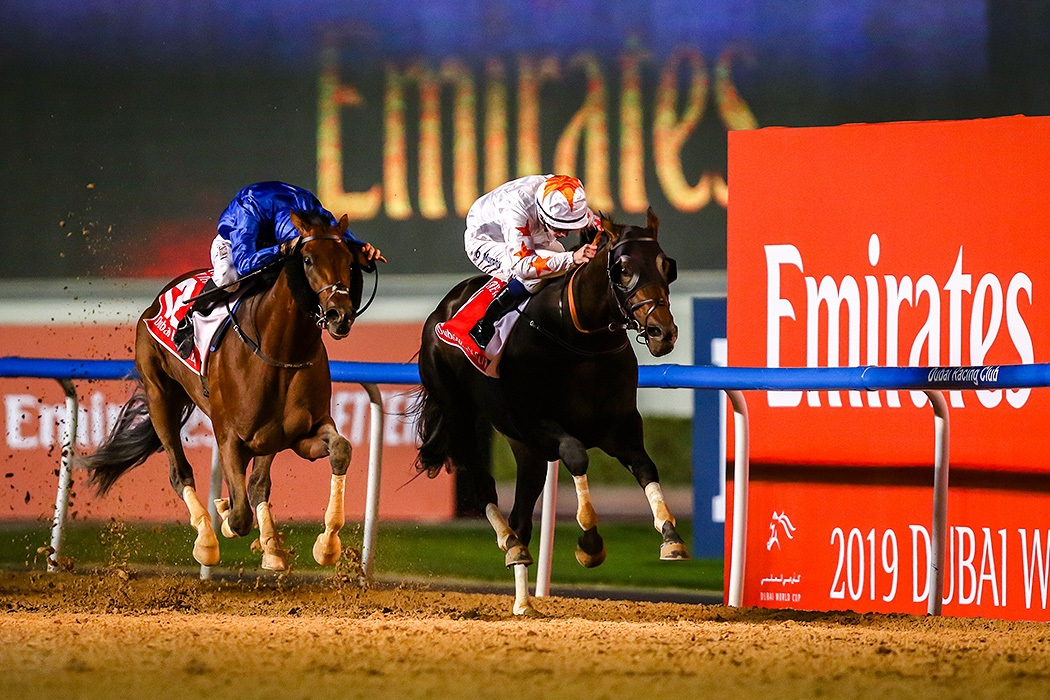
- Gronkowski (right) in the 2019 Dubai World Cup
- Sire: Lonhro
- Grandsire: Octagonal
- Dam: Four Sugars
- Damsire: Lookin At Lucky
- Sex: Colt
- Foaled: February 1, 2015
- Country: United States
- Colour: Bay
- Breeder: Epic Thoroughbred
- Owner: Phoenix Thoroughbred
- Trainer: Chad C. Brown
- Record: 15: 4-3-3
- Earnings: £2,441,098

Major wins
- Burradon Stakes (2018)

Gronkowski is a Thoroughbred racehorse (born in 2015) who came second in the 2018 Belmont Stakes and 2019 Dubai World Cup. He is named after American football tight end Rob Gronkowski, who is a minority owner of the horse.

== Racing career ==
Gronkowski raced several times in the United Kingdom, and won the Burradon Stakes. He was then going to race in the 2018 Kentucky Derby, but pulled out due to a fever. He went to the 2018 Belmont Stakes instead where he finished second in the race with odds of 24.75 to 1.

As a four-year-old, Gronkowski came second in the 2019 Dubai World Cup, losing to Thunder Snow by a nose.
