= Al Maktoum Classic =

- Class: Group Two
- Location: Meydan Racecourse; Dubai, United Arab Emirates
- Inaugurated: 1994
- Race type: Thoroughbred - Flat racing
- Sponsor: Longines Record (since 2022)

Race information
- Distance: 1,900 metres
- Surface: Dirt
- Track: Left-handed
- Purse: US$600,000 (2024)

The Al Maktoum Classic, is a horse race run over a distance of 1,900 metres (approximately 1 mile, 1 1/2 furlongs) on dirt in February at Meydan Racecourse in Dubai. The event was previously known as Al Maktoum Challenge, Round 2 and it was the second of three races in the Al Maktoum Challenge series which serve as trial races for the Dubai World Cup.

It was first run in 1994 on dirt at Nad Al Sheba Racecourse. It was transferred to Meydan in 2010 where it was run on the synthetic Tapeta Footings surface. In 2015 the synthetic surface at Meydan was replaced by a dirt track.

The race was originally run over 2,000 metres and was run over 2,400 metres in 1996 before the distance was reduced to 1,800 metres in 1997. The current distance was established when the race moved to Meydan in 2010.

The race began as an ungraded stakes race before attaining Listed status in 1996. The race was elevated to Group 3 level in 2002 and became a Group 2 event in 2012. In 2024 the event moved from Al Maktoum Challenge series and scheduled in March.

== Records ==
Record time:

- 1:46.92 - Altibr (1999) (1800 metres)
- 1:55.67 - Prince Bishop (2014) (1900 metres)

Most successful horse (2 wins):

- Best of the Bests – 2001, 2002
- Jack Sullivan – 2005, 2006

Most wins by a jockey:

- 5 - Frankie Dettori (1996, 2001, 2002, 2003, 2009)

Most wins by a trainer:

- 12 - Saeed bin Suroor (1996, 1999, 2001, 2002, 2003, 2009, 2010, 2012, 2013, 2014, 2018, 2020)

Most wins by an owner:

- 10 - Godolphin Racing (1995, 2001, 2002, 2003, 2009, 2010, 2013, 2016, 2018, 2020)

== Winners ==
| Year | Winner | Age | Jockey | Trainer | Owner | Time |
|---|---|---|---|---|---|---|
| 1994 | Cezanne | 5 | Gary Hind | Hilal Ibrahim | Sheikh Mohammed | 2:05.87 |
| 1995 | Halling | 4 | John Carroll | Hilal Ibrahim | Godolphin | 2:04.29 |
| 1996 | Larrocha | 4 | Frankie Dettori | Saeed bin Suroor | Maktoum bin Mohammed Al Maktoum | 2:30.75 |
| 1997 | Tropicool | 4 | Brett Doyle | Dhruba Selvaratnam | Ahmed Al Maktoum | 1:50.34 |
| 1998 | Wathik | 8 | Paul Eddery | Paddy Rudkin | Saeed Al Ghandi | 1:52.11 |
| 1999 | Altibr | 4 | Richard Hills | Saeed bin Suroor | Hamdan Al Maktoum | 1:46.92 |
| 2000 | Get Away With It^{[a]} | 7 | Peter Brette | Michael Stoute | Maktoum Al Maktoum | 1:48.20 |
| 2001 | Best of the Bests | 4 | Frankie Dettori | Saeed bin Suroor | Godolphin | 1:47.85 |
| 2002 | Best of the Bests | 5 | Frankie Dettori | Saeed bin Suroor | Godolphin | 1:48.63 |
| 2003 | Moon Ballad | 4 | Frankie Dettori | Saeed bin Suroor | Godolphin | 1:47.98 |
| 2004 | Victory Moon | 4 | Weichong Marwing | Mike de Kock | Mad Syndicate | 1:49.51 |
| 2005 | Jack Sullivan | 5 | Darryll Holland | Gerard Butler | International Carnival Partnership | 1:50.55 |
| 2006 | Jack Sullivan | 6 | Eddie Ahern | Gerard Butler | International Carnival Partnership | 1:52.55 |
| 2007 | Kandidate | 5 | Ryan Moore | Clive Brittain | A J Richards | 1:49.40 |
| 2008 | Lucky Find | 4 | Kevin Shea | Mike de Kock | Ahmed bin Moh'd bin Khalifa Al Maktoum | 1:49:06 |
| 2009 | My Indy | 4 | Frankie Dettori | Saeed bin Suroor | Godolphin | 1:50.53 |
| 2010 | Allybar | 4 | Ahmed Atjebi | Saeed bin Suroor | Godolphin | 1:57.05 |
| 2011 | Bold Silvano | 4 | Christophe Soumillon | Mike de Kock | Mohammed bin Khalifa Al Maktoum | 1:57.71 |
| 2012 | Mendip | 5 | Kieren Fallon | Saeed bin Suroor | Hamdan bin Mohammed Al Maktoum | 1:56.42 |
| 2013 | Hunter's Light | 5 | Silvestre de Sousa | Saeed bin Suroor | Godolphin | 1:58.19 |
| 2014 | Prince Bishop | 7 | Kieren Fallon | Saeed bin Suroor | Hamdan bin Mohammed Al Maktoum | 1:55.67 |
| 2015 | Frankyfourfingers | 5 | Mickael Barzalona | Salem bin Ghadayer | Hamdan bin Mohammed Al Maktoum | 1:58.24 |
| 2016 | Frosted | 4 | William Buick | Kiaran McLaughlin | Godolphin | 1:56.67 |
| 2017 | Furia Cruzada | 5 | Antonio Fresu | Erwan Charpy | Fernando Fantini | 1:58.85 |
| 2018 | Thunder Snow | 4 | Christophe Soumillon | Saeed bin Suroor | Godolphin | 1:57.89 |
| 2019 | North America | 7 | Richard Mullen | Satish Seemar | Ramzan Kadyrov | 1:58.65 |
| 2020 | Benbatl | 6 | Christophe Soumillon | Saeed bin Suroor | Godolphin | 1:56.80 |
| 2021 | Salute The Soldier | 6 | Adrie de Vries | Fawzi Abdulla Nass | Victorious | 1:57.37 |
| 2022 | Hot Rod Charlie | 4 | William Buick | Doug O'Neill | Roadrunner Racing, Boat Racing & William Strauss | 1:57.41 |
| 2023 | Algiers | 6 | James Doyle | Simon & Ed Crisford | Hamdan Sultan Ali Al Sabousi | 1:56.08 |
| 2024 | Military Law | 9 | Oscar Chavez | Musabbeh Al Mheiri | Naser Askar | 1:58.07 |
| 2025 | Imperial Emperor | 5 | Tadhg O'Shea | Bhupat Seemar | Naser Askar | 2:03.76 |
| 2026 | Meydaan | 5 | William Buick | Simon & Ed Crisford | Sheikh Ahmed Al Maktoum | 1:53.17 |

^{a} Worldly Manner finished first in 2000 but was disqualified after failing a post-race drug test.

== See also ==
- List of United Arab Emirates horse races
