= Capri (horse) =

Irish-bred Thoroughbred racehorse

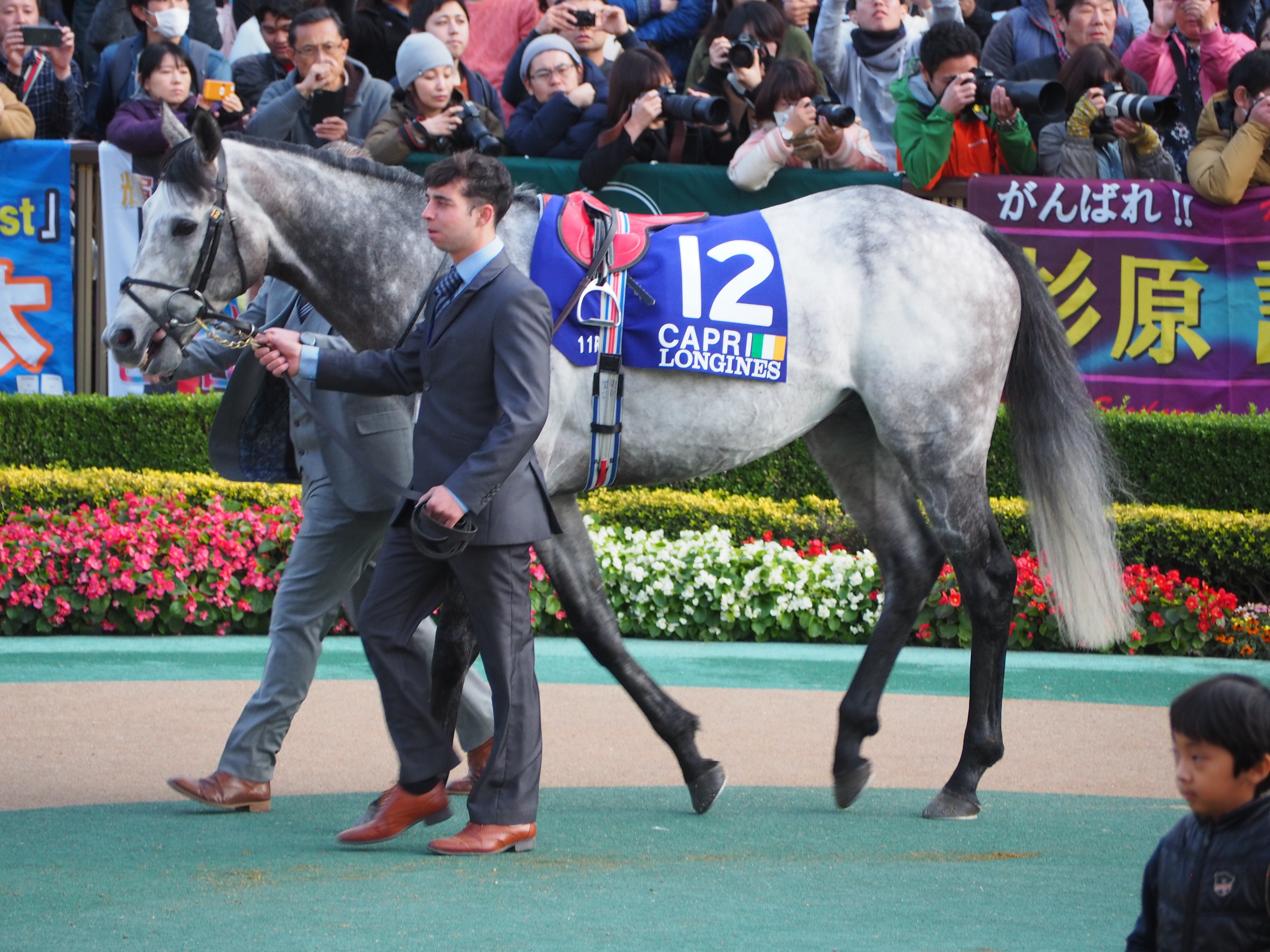
- Capri at the 2018 Japan Cup.
- Sire: Galileo
- Grandsire: Sadler's Wells
- Dam: Dialafara
- Damsire: Anabaa
- Sex: Colt
- Foaled: 7 February 2014
- Country: Ireland
- Colour: Grey
- Breeder: Lynch Bages Ltd & Camas Park Stud
- Owner: Sue Magnier, Derrick Smith & Michael Tabor
- Trainer: Aidan O'Brien
- Record: 23: 6-1-4
- Earnings: £1,511,598

Major wins
- Canford Cliffs Stakes (2016); Beresford Stakes (2016); Irish Derby (2017); St Leger (2017); Alleged Stakes (2018)

Capri (foaled 7 February 2014) is an Irish Thoroughbred racehorse. As a two-year-old in 2016 he won three of his five races including the Canford Cliffs Stakes and the Beresford Stakes as well as finishing third in the Critérium de Saint-Cloud. In the following year he was beaten in his first two races and finished sixth in The Derby before emerging as one of the best colts of his generation in Europe with wins in the Irish Derby and the St Leger. He won the Alleged Stakes on his four-year-old debut but failed to win in eleven subsequent starts and was retired from racing at the end of 2019.

== Background ==
Capri is a grey horse bred in Ireland by Lynch Bages Ltd & Camas Park Stud, breeding companies associated with the Coolmore Stud organisation. The colt was sent into training with Aidan O'Brien at Ballydoyle. Like many Coolmore horses, the official details of his ownership have changed from race to race: he has sometimes been listed as being the property of Susan Magnier, while on other occasions he has been described as being owned by a partnership of Derrick Smith, Michael Tabor and Susan Magnier. The name "Capri" had previously been used for numerous other horses including a high-class stayer who won the Cumberland Lodge Stakes in 1998.

He was sired by Galileo, who won the Derby, Irish Derby and King George VI and Queen Elizabeth Stakes in 2001. Galileo is now one of the world's leading stallions and has been champion sire of Great Britain and Ireland eight times so far. His other progeny include Cape Blanco, Frankel, Golden Lilac, Nathaniel, New Approach, Rip Van Winkle, Found, Minding and Ruler of the World. Capri's dam Dialafara, from whom he inherited his grey colour, showed no racing ability, finishing last in her only race. She was a daughter of the Prix de Malleret winner Diamalina and a descendant of the British broodmare Padus (foaled 1955) who was the ancestor of many other major winners including Pampapaul, Arctic Owl and Victoire Pisa.

== Racing career ==
=== 2016: two-year-old season ===
Capri made his racecourse debut in maiden race over seven furlongs at the Curragh on 16 July and finished second of the thirteen runners, beaten half a length by Arcada. Two weeks later at Galway Races he started 2/7 favourite for a maiden over 8 1/2 furlongs and recorde his first success as he took the lead three furlongs from the finish and won "comfortably" by two and a half length from Rekindling. Seven days after his win at Galway the colt was stepped up in class for the Listed Canford Cliffs Stakes at Tipperary Racecourse and started 8/11 favourite against six opponents. Ridden as on his two previous starts by Seamie Heffernan he went to the front soon after the start and kept on well to win by two lengths.

Ryan Moore took the ride when Capri reappeared in the Group 2 Beresford Stakes on heavy ground at the Curragh on 25 September. Starting the odds-on favourite in a six-runner field he raced in third place before taking the lead a furlong out and won by three quarters of a length from his stablemate Yucatan. Aidan O'Brien said of the winner "Capri is a nice moving horse and should prefer better ground". On his final appearance of the season Capri was sent to France and started favourite for the Group 1 Critérium de Saint-Cloud over 2000 metres on 30 October. He stayed on well in the straight without ever looking likely to win and finished third of the thirteen runners behind Waldgeist and Best Solution. His stablemate Wings of Eagles finished ninth.

=== 2017: three-year-old season ===
In his first race as a three-year-old, Capri contested the Group 3 Ballysax Stakes over ten furlongs at Leopardstown Racecourse on 8 April. After briefly struggling to obtain a clear run in the straight he was not given a hard ride by Heffernan and finished fourth behind Rekindling, Douglas Macarthur and Yucatan. The Derrinstown Stud Derby Trial over the same course and distance on 7 May resulted in a three-way photo-finish between the O'Brien stable's representatives as the front-running Douglas Macarthur beat Yucatan by a head with Capri a short head away in third. Capri was part of a five-horse O'Brien entry for the 2017 Epsom Derby on 3 June. Starting at odds of 16/1 he turned into the straight in eighth place and stayed on in the last quarter mile to finish sixth behind Wings of Eagles, Cliffs of Moher, Cracksman, Eminent and Benbatl beaten less than four lengths by the winner.

On 1 July at the Curragh Capri, ridden by Heffernan, started at odds of 6/1 in a nine-runner field for the Irish Derby. Wings of Eagles started favourite, while the other runners included Cracksman, Waldgeist and Douglas Macarthur. He raced in second place behind the pacemaker The Anvil before going to the front two furlongs out. He was strongly pressed in the closing stages but stayed on well under pressure to prevail by a neck and a short head from Cracksman and Wings of Eagles. After the race O'Brien said "I was always a great believer in this horse. Even after Epsom, Seamus wanted to come here and ride him. We know that he gets a mile and a half and we know that he's brave". Heffernan commented "This horse has been competing in very good races all year and the Curragh suited him. I was always comfortable in my position and we went a good gallop. He galloped all the way to the line. He stays well and tries hard... It's great that he looks like he's improving". The BBC's racing correspondent described the colt's performance as "thoroughly gutsy".

After a break of 2 1/2 months, Capri returned in the 241st running of the St Leger over 14 1/2 furlongs at Doncaster Racecourse on 16 September. The race was described as "one of the best and most competitive Legers for years". Ridden by Ryan Moore (jockey) he was made the 3/1 favourite against ten opponents including Stradivarius, Crystal Ocean, Defoe, Coronet (Ribblesdale Stakes), Venice Beach (Chester Vase), Rekindling, Raheen House (Bahrain Trophy) and Douglas Macarthur. The Anvil again acted as a pacemaker for the O'Brien team and opened up a long lead with Capri settled in fourth. Capri moved up on the outside to take the lead early in the straight from Stradivarius who raced on the inside rail. In a closely contested finish Capri ran on well and won by half a length and a short head from Crystal Ocean and Stradivarius. He became the first Irish Derby winner to take the race since Nijinsky in 1970. After the race Moore said "I think it was a very good Leger... he's not done a lot wrong in his life. It was hard work but that didn't bother him. It was a hard race but he didn't look like a horse who had killed himself afterwards. Any of the first three would have been very worthy winners... he fought them off when he had to. He was very brave when the second came to me – he has plenty of heart". On his final run of the year he contested the Prix de l'Arc de Triomphe at Chantilly Racecourse but was never in contention and finished unplaced behind Enable.

=== 2018: four-year-old season ===
Capri began his third campaign in the Group 3 Alleged Stakes over ten furlongs at Naas Racecourse on 13 April and started the 7/4 favourite against four opponents headed by his stablemate Cliffs of Moher. Ridden by Ryan Moore he took the lead soon after the start and held on in the closing stages to win by a head from Cannonball.

After an absence of five months the colt returned in the Prix Foy over 2400 metres at Longchamp Racecourse and finished fifth of the six runners behind Waldgeist. On 7 October Capri started a 25/1 outsider in his second attempt to win the Prix de l'Arc de Triomphe, and made a much stronger bid than he had done in 2017. After racing in second place he went to the front in the straight but was outpaced in the last 300 metres and finished fifth behind Enable, Sea of Class, Cloth of Stars and Waldgeist, beaten just over three lengths by the winner. Two weeks later the colt was dropped back in distance for the ten furlong Champion Stakes on soft ground at Ascot Racecourse and was strongly supported in the betting, going off the 4/1 third choice in an eight-runner field. After racing in second place he moved up to dispute the lead in the straight but was again outpaced in the closing stages and came home fourth behind Cracksman, Crystal Ocean and the Czech-trained outsider Subway Dancer.

=== 2019: five-year-old season ===
On his first run as a five-year-old Capri started 5/4 favourite for Group 3 Vintage Crop Stakes over fourteen furlongs at Navan Racecourse on 28 April but finished a well-beaten fifth of the nine runners behind the four-year-old gelding Master of Reality. He disappointed again at Leopardstown in the following month, coming home third to Twilight Payment when odds-on favourite for the Listed Levmoss Stakes. On 20 June at Royal Ascot the horse started a 16/1 outsider for the Gold Cup in which he was ridden by Donnacha O'Brien. He looked to be in contention early in the straight but faded in the closing stages to finish sixth, eight lengths behind the winner Stradivarius. After a break of over two months he returned in the Irish St Leger Trial Stakes at the Curragh and finished fourth behind his stablemate Southern France. In the Irish St Leger on 15 September he made no impression and came home last of the ten runners. Capri ended his track career in the British Champions Long Distance Cup on 19 October when he raced prominently before fading in the closing stages and finishing sixth behind Kew Gardens.

== Stud career ==
In October 2019 it was announced that Capri had been retired from racing to become a National Hunt breeding stallion at Grange Stud in County Cork.

== Pedigree ==
Pedigree of Capri (IRE), grey colt, 2014
Sire Galileo (IRE) 1998	Sadler's Wells (USA); 1981	Northern Dancer	Nearctic
Sire Galileo (IRE) 1998	Sadler's Wells (USA); 1981	Northern Dancer	Natalma
Sire Galileo (IRE) 1998	Sadler's Wells (USA); 1981	Fairy Bridge	Bold Reason
Sire Galileo (IRE) 1998	Sadler's Wells (USA); 1981	Fairy Bridge	Special
Sire Galileo (IRE) 1998	Urban Sea (USA) ch. 1989	Miswaki	Mr. Prospector
Sire Galileo (IRE) 1998	Urban Sea (USA) ch. 1989	Miswaki	Hopespringseternal
Sire Galileo (IRE) 1998	Urban Sea (USA) ch. 1989	Allegretta	Lombard
Sire Galileo (IRE) 1998	Urban Sea (USA) ch. 1989	Allegretta	Anatevka
Dam Dialafara (FR) 2007	Anabaa (USA); 1992	Danzig	Northern Dancer
Dam Dialafara (FR) 2007	Anabaa (USA); 1992	Danzig	Pas de Nom
Dam Dialafara (FR) 2007	Anabaa (USA); 1992	Balbonella	Gay Mecene
Dam Dialafara (FR) 2007	Anabaa (USA); 1992	Balbonella	Bamieres
Dam Dialafara (FR) 2007	Diamilina (FR); 1998	Linamix	Mendez
Dam Dialafara (FR) 2007	Diamilina (FR); 1998	Linamix	Lunadix
Dam Dialafara (FR) 2007	Diamilina (FR); 1998	Diamonaka	Akarad
Dam Dialafara (FR) 2007	Diamilina (FR); 1998	Diamonaka	Diamond Seal (Family 8-d)

- Capri is inbred 3 × 4 to Northern Dancer, meaning that this stallion appears in both the third and fourth generations of his pedigree.
