= Japan (horse) =

British-bred Thoroughbred racehorse

- Sire: Galileo
- Grandsire: Sadler's Wells
- Dam: Shastye
- Damsire: Danehill
- Sex: Colt
- Foaled: 22 February 2016
- Country: United Kingdom
- Colour: Bay
- Breeder: Newsells Park Stud
- Owner: Susan Magnier, Michael Tabor, Derrick Smith & Masaaki Matsushima
- Trainer: Aidan O'Brien
- Record: 15: 6-0-3
- Earnings: £1,688,876

Major wins
- Beresford Stakes (2018); King Edward VII Stakes (2019); Grand Prix de Paris (2019); International Stakes (2019); Ormonde Stakes (2021); Meld Stakes (2021)

Japan (foaled 22 February 2016) is a British-bred Irish-trained Thoroughbred racehorse. After being sold as a yearling for 1.3 million guineas he was sent into training with Aidan O'Brien. As a two-year-old in 2018 he showed considerable promise, winning two of his three races including the Group 2 Beresford Stakes. In the following year he improved to become one of the best three-year-olds in Europe, finishing fourth in the Dante Stakes and third in the Epsom Derby before winning the King Edward VII Stakes, the Grand Prix de Paris and the International Stakes. He failed to win in five attempts as a four-year-old in 2020.

== Background ==
Japan is a bay colt with a white blaze bred in England by the Hertfordshire-based Newsells Park Stud. In October 2017 the yearling was put up for auction at Tattersalls and was bought for 1.3 million guineas by representatives of the Coolmore Stud. He was sent into training with Aidan O'Brien at Ballydoyle. Like many Coolmore horses, the official details of his ownership changed from race to race but in his first two seasons he was usually described as being owned by a partnership of Derrick Smith, Susan Magnier and Michael Tabor.

He was sired by Galileo, who won the Derby, Irish Derby and King George VI and Queen Elizabeth Stakes in 2001. Galileo became one of the world's leading stallions, earning his tenth champion sire of Great Britain and Ireland title in 2018. His other progeny include Cape Blanco, Frankel, Golden Lilac, Nathaniel, New Approach, Rip Van Winkle, Found Minding and Ruler of the World. Japan's dam Shastye showed above average racing ability, winning two minor races and running second in the Listed Pontefract Castle Stakes. She did better as a broodmare, producing several other winners including Secret Gesture (runner-up in the Epsom Oaks) and Isaac Newton (International Stakes). Shastye was a half-sister to Sagamix and closely related to Sagawara, Nasram, Lope de Vega and Tambourine.

== Racing career ==
=== 2018: two-year-old season ===
On his racecourse debut Japan started at odds of 9/1 for a maiden race over one mile at the Curragh on 1 September in which he was ridden by Wayne Lordan and came home seventh of the thirteen runners behind his more fancied stablemate Sydney Opera House. Eleven days later the colt started odds-on favourite for a similar event over seven furlongs on heavy ground at Listowel Racecourse. Ridden by his trainer's son Donnacha O'Brien he raced in mid-division before finishing strongly and won "comfortably" by three quarters of a length from Aristocratic Man, having taken the lead in the last 100 yards. Japan was then stepped up in class to contest the Group 2 Beresford Stakes over one mile at Naas Racecourse in which he was partnered by Seamie Heffernan and started the 11/2 third favourite behind his stablemates Mount Everest and Sovereign. After racing in third place for most of the way he moved up to challenge Mount Everest in the closing stages and got up in the final stride to win by a short head.

=== 2019: three-year-old season ===
Japan's early preparation for his second season was interrupted when he missed three weeks of training after developing an abnormally high temperature. For his first run as a three-year-old, Japan was sent to England for the Dante Stakes (a major trial race for the Epsom Derby) over 10 1/2 furlongs at York Racecourse on 16 May. Ridden by Ryan Moore he never looked likely to win and came home fourth of the eight runners behind Telecaster, Too Darn Hot and Surfman. The 240th running of the Derby took place over 1 1/2 miles at Epsom Racecourse on 1 June 2019 and Japan, one of a seven-horse O'Brien entry, started at odds of 20/1. Ridden by Lordan, Japan raced towards the rear and turned into the straight in eleventh place before making strong progress on the wide outside. Despite Lordan dropping his whip inside the final furlong the colt finished third to Anthony Van Dyck and Madhmoon in a blanket finish with Broome and Sir Dragonet just behind.

Twenty days after his third place at Epsom Japan ran for the third time in England when he was partnered by Moore and started 6/4 favourite for the Group 2 King Edward VII Stakes at Royal Ascot. His seven opponents included Private Secretary (Cocked Hat Stakes), Pablo Escobarr (runner-up in the Lingfield Derby Trial) and Bangkok (Sandown Classic Trial). After being restrained by Moore in the early stages he moved up to take the lead in the straight and "powered clear" to win by 4 1/2 lengths from Bangkok. Ryan Moore commented "This is a high-class colt. He's very good, and he put them to bed very easily there. He was the best horse. It was just keeping it simple, really".

On 14 July Japan was sent to France for the Group 1 Grand Prix de Paris over 2400 metres at Longchamp Racecourse. With Moore again in the saddle he went off the 1/2 favourite in an eight-runner field which also included Roman Candle (Prix Greffulhe), Slalom (Prix Noailles), Jalmoud (Prix de l'Avre) and Western Australia (Yeats Stakes) who appeared to be acting as Japan's pacemaker. Japan raced in third place behind Western Australia and Jalmoud before taking the lead 300 metres out and won "readily" by half a length from Slalom. O'Brien said "We were very happy with him... At Ascot, they went very fast, and when he came there, the rest of the field died away. Here they didn't go fast early, and then it was sprinting all the way. Knowing the horse, we were very happy with him", before suggesting that the colt would be aimed at the Prix de l'Arc de Triomphe.

The 48th running of the International Stakes over 10 1/2 furlongs at York on 21 August saw Japan (with Moore in the saddle) matched against older horses for the first time. He started the 5/1 third favourite behind Crystal Ocean and King of Comedy in a nine-runner field which also included Circus Maximus, Cheval Grand and Lord Glitters (Queen Anne Stakes). After tracking the leaders as his stablemate Circus Maximus set the pace Japan moved up to dispute the lead approaching the final furlong and got the better of a back-and-forth struggle with Crystal Ocean to win by a head. After the race O'Brien said "We always thought that he was very good, but he had a setback in the spring and we thought he wasn’t going to make the Derby... but he ran a super race. We've always thought the three-year-olds have been under-rated; it's a good crop and we’ve been very happy with them."

On 6 October Japan was made the 9/1 third favourite for France's most prestigious race, the Prix de l'Arc de Triomphe over 2400 metres on very soft ground at Longchamp. Ridden by Moore he raced in mid-division before making steady progress in the straight and finishing fourth behind Waldgeist, Enable and Sottsass.

In the 2019 World's Best Racehorse Rankings Japan was given a rating of 122, making him the nineteenth best racehorse in the world and the second best three-year-old.

=== 2020: four-year-old season ===
In February a share in the horse's ownership was acquired by Masaaki Matsushima. The flat racing season in Britain and Ireland was disrupted by the COVID-19 outbreak and Japan did not make his reappearance until 17 June when he contested the Prince of Wales's Stakes which was run behind closed doors at Royal Ascot. Ridden by Moore, he started the 6/4 favourite but was unable to recover from a slow start and finished fourth behind the geldings Lord North, Addeybb and Barney Roy. On 5 July Japan started third choice in the betting for the Eclipse Stakes which was not open to three-year-olds for the first time. He tracked the front-running Ghaiyyath for most of the way but was unable to peg back the leader in the straight and lost second place to Enable in the closing stages. Three weeks later the colt started second favourite for the King George VI and Queen Elizabeth Stakes at Ascot but after reportedly sustaining a "stone bruise" in the race he finished tailed off last of the three runners behind Enable and Sovereign. In the Irish Champion Stakes at Leopardstown Racecourse in September the colt never threatened to win and came home fifth of the six runners behind his stablemate Magical. On his final run of the year Japan produced another disappointing effort as he finished unplaced in the Champion Stakes at Ascot on 17 October.

In the 2020 World's Best Racehorse Rankings, Japan was rated on 120, making him the equal 40th best racehorse in the world.

== Pedigree ==
Pedigree of Japan (GB), bay colt, 2016
Sire Galileo (IRE) 1998	Sadler's Wells (USA); 1981	Northern Dancer (CAN)	Nearctic
Sire Galileo (IRE) 1998	Sadler's Wells (USA); 1981	Northern Dancer (CAN)	Natalma (USA)
Sire Galileo (IRE) 1998	Sadler's Wells (USA); 1981	Fairy Bridge	Bold Reason
Sire Galileo (IRE) 1998	Sadler's Wells (USA); 1981	Fairy Bridge	Special
Sire Galileo (IRE) 1998	Urban Sea (USA) ch. 1989	Miswaki	Mr. Prospector
Sire Galileo (IRE) 1998	Urban Sea (USA) ch. 1989	Miswaki	Hopespringseternal
Sire Galileo (IRE) 1998	Urban Sea (USA) ch. 1989	Allegretta (GB)	Lombard (GER)
Sire Galileo (IRE) 1998	Urban Sea (USA) ch. 1989	Allegretta (GB)	Anatevka (GER)
Dam Shastye (IRE) 2001	Danehill (USA); 1986	Danzig	Northern Dancer (CAN)
Dam Shastye (IRE) 2001	Danehill (USA); 1986	Danzig	Pas de Nom
Dam Shastye (IRE) 2001	Danehill (USA); 1986	Razyana	His Majesty
Dam Shastye (IRE) 2001	Danehill (USA); 1986	Razyana	Spring Adieu (CAN)
Dam Shastye (IRE) 2001	Saganeca (USA); 1988	Sagace (FR)	Luthier
Dam Shastye (IRE) 2001	Saganeca (USA); 1988	Sagace (FR)	Seneca
Dam Shastye (IRE) 2001	Saganeca (USA); 1988	Haglette	Hagley
Dam Shastye (IRE) 2001	Saganeca (USA); 1988	Haglette	Sucrette (Family 11-d)

- Japan is inbred 3 × 4 to Northern Dancer, meaning that this stallion appears in both the third and fourth generations of his pedigree.
