= Sovereign (horse) =

Irish-bred Thoroughbred racehorse

- Racing silks of Susan Magnier
- Sire: Galileo
- Grandsire: Sadler's Wells
- Dam: Devoted To You
- Damsire: Danehill Dancer
- Sex: Colt
- Foaled: 19 May 2016
- Country: Ireland
- Colour: Chestnut
- Breeder: Barronstown Stud
- Owner: Susan Magnier, Michael Tabor & Derrick Smith
- Trainer: Aidan O'Brien
- Record: 14: 2-2-4
- Earnings: £971,121

Major wins
- Irish Derby (2019)

Sovereign (foaled 9 April 2016) is an Irish Thoroughbred racehorse, best known for winning the 2019 Irish Derby. He showed promising form as a juvenile in 2018 when he won one minor race as well as finishing third in the Eyrefield Stakes and fourth in the Beresford Stakes. In the following year he was placed in the Ballysax Stakes and the Derrinstown Stud Derby Trial before running unplaced when acting as a pacemaker in the 2019 Epsom Derby. He was given little chance in the Irish Derby but won easily at odds of 33/1. He failed to win in 2020 but was placed in the King George VI and Queen Elizabeth Stakes, Vintage Crop Stakes and Bahrain International Trophy.

== Background ==
Sovereign is a chestnut colt with a white blaze and three white socks bred in Ireland by the County Wicklow-based Barronstown Stud. He entered the ownership of the Coolmore Stud organisation and was sent into training with Aidan O'Brien at Ballydoyle. Like many Coolmore horses, the official details of his ownership have changed from race to race but he has usually been described as being owned by a partnership of Michael Tabor, Derrick Smith and Susan Magnier.

He was sired by Galileo, who won the Derby, Irish Derby and King George VI and Queen Elizabeth Stakes in 2001. Galileo became one of the world's leading stallions, earning his tenth champion sire of Great Britain and Ireland title in 2018. His other progeny include Cape Blanco, Frankel, Golden Lilac, Nathaniel, New Approach, Rip Van Winkle, Found, Minding and Ruler of the World. Sovereign's dam Devoted To You showed good racing ability, winning one minor race and finishing second in the Debutante Stakes. Devoted To You's dam Alleged Devotion was a half-sister to Balanchine.

== Racing career ==
=== 2018: two-year-old season ===
On his racecourse debut Sovereign started at odds of 100/30 for a maiden race at Leopardstown Racecourse on 21 June and finished fifth, beaten seven and a half lengths by the Dermot Weld-trained winner Masaff. He was ridden in this race by Padraig Beggy a Ballydoyle work rider who had come to prominence in 2017 by winning the Epsom Derby on the 40/1 outsider Wings of Eagles. Two months later he was partnered by Michael Hussey in a similar event over one mile at the Curragh and came home sixth of the fourteen runners as victory went to his stablemate Mount Everest. On 18 September at Galway Races the colt started favourite for a maiden over eight and a half furlongs on heavy ground in which he was ridden by his trainer's son Donnacha O'Brien. Sovereign took the lead soon after the start, went clear of his rivals approaching the last quarter mile and recorded his first success as he won "easily" by fourteen lengths despite being eased down by O'Brien in the closing stages.

Twelve days after his win at Galway the colt was stepped up in class and started the 3/1 second choice in the betting behind Mount Everest in the Group 2 Beresford Stakes at Naas Racecourse. With O'Brien in the saddle he led for most of the way but was outpaced in the last two furlongs and came home fourth as the Ballydoyle third string Japan won narrowly from Mount Everest. He ended his season in the Group 3 Eyrefield Stakes at Leopardstown on 27 October in which he made the running before being overtaken in the final furlong and finishing third to Guaranteed (trained by Jim Bolger) and Masaff.

In the official ratings for Irish-raced juveniles for 2018 Sovereign was given a mark of 103, making him 18 pounds inferior to the top-rated Quorto.

=== 2019: three-year-old season ===
On his first two runs as a three-year-old Sovereign was partnered by Seamie Heffernan. He began his campaign in the Group 3 Ballysax Stakes over ten furlongs at Leopardstown on 27 April when he proved no match for his stablemate Broome and was beaten eight lengths into second place after briefly leading two furlongs out. In the Derrinstown Stud Derby Trial over the same course and distance two weeks later he kept on well in the straight without looking likely to win and finished third behind Broome and the Ballydoyle pacemaker Blenheim Palace. Sovereign was reunited with Beggy when he was one of seven O'Brien runners to contest the 2019 Epsom Derby and started a 50/1 outsider. Acting as a pacemaker for the stable's more highly regarded contenders, he went to the front and led the field into the straight before fading to come home tenth of the thirteen runners, just over nine lengths behind the winner Anthony Van Dyck.

Sovereign was expected to fulfil a similar pacemaking role when he started at odds of 33/1 in an eight-runner field for the Irish Derby over one and a half miles at the Curragh on 29 June. Anthony Van Dyck started favourite ahead of Broome and the Epsom Derby runner-up Madhmoon while the other four runners were Rakan (King George V Cup), Norway (Zetland Stakes), Il Paradiso and Guaranteed. Beggy sent the colt to the front soon after the start, opened up a clear advantage at half way and increased his lead entering the straight. He never looked in the slightest danger of defeat in the closing stages and won "easily" by six lengths from Anthony Van Dyck. Aidan O'Brien commented "Padraig was in front and he was comfortable and his horse kept coming. I'd say anytime that you make the running you have to get the fractions right, and he did. The Curragh is a big, open galloping track and he has a massive stride. The undulations at Epsom might not have suited him as much". He went on to mention the Grand Prix de Paris, King George VI & Queen Elizabeth Stakes and St Leger as possible future targets.

In September Aidan O'Brien announced that Sovereign would not race again in 2019, saying "He hasn't had a setback, we just want to give him time".

=== 2020: four-year-old season ===
The 2020 flat racing season in Britain and Ireland was restructured as a result of the COVID-19 outbreak and Sovereign made his first appearance of the year in the fourteen furlong Vintage Crop Stakes which was run behind closed doors at the Curragh on 27 June. Under a gentle ride from Heffernan he kept on well from the rear of the field to finish third of the seven runners, beaten three lengths by the winner Twilight Payment. Four weeks later the colt started the 12/1 outsider of three runners for the King George VI and Queen Elizabeth Stakes at Ascot Racecourse in which he set the pace and opened up a big lead before being overtaken approaching the final furlong and finishing second to Enable. In his three remaining races of 2020 the colt was ridden by Ryan Moore. On 13 September he started 5/2 favourite for the Irish St Leger but after leading for most of the way he faded in the straight and came home sixth behind Search For A Song. Sovereign ended his European campaign in the British Champions Long Distance Cup over two miles at Ascot Racecourse on 17 October. Starting the a 14/1 outsider he tracked the leaders and moved up into second place in the straight but was unable to make further progress and finished fifth of the fourteen runners behind Trueshan. For his final run of the year the colt was sent to Sakhir Racecourse in Bahrain to contest the Bahrain International Trophy over 2000 metres on 20 November. He was in contention from the start and stayed on strongly in the closing stages to finish a close third, beaten a neck and a nose by Simsir and Global Giant.

== Pedigree ==
Pedigree of Sovereign (IRE), chestnut colt, 2016
Sire Galileo (IRE) 1998	Sadler's Wells (USA); 1981	Northern Dancer (CAN)	Nearctic
Sire Galileo (IRE) 1998	Sadler's Wells (USA); 1981	Northern Dancer (CAN)	Natalma (USA)
Sire Galileo (IRE) 1998	Sadler's Wells (USA); 1981	Fairy Bridge	Bold Reason
Sire Galileo (IRE) 1998	Sadler's Wells (USA); 1981	Fairy Bridge	Special
Sire Galileo (IRE) 1998	Urban Sea (USA) ch. 1989	Miswaki	Mr. Prospector
Sire Galileo (IRE) 1998	Urban Sea (USA) ch. 1989	Miswaki	Hopespringseternal
Sire Galileo (IRE) 1998	Urban Sea (USA) ch. 1989	Allegretta (GB)	Lombard (GER)
Sire Galileo (IRE) 1998	Urban Sea (USA) ch. 1989	Allegretta (GB)	Anatevka (GER)
Dam Devoted To You (IRE) 2007	Danehill Dancer (IRE); 1993	Danehill (USA)	Danzig
Dam Devoted To You (IRE) 2007	Danehill Dancer (IRE); 1993	Danehill (USA)	Razyana
Dam Devoted To You (IRE) 2007	Danehill Dancer (IRE); 1993	Mira Adonde (USA)	Sharpen Up (GB)
Dam Devoted To You (IRE) 2007	Danehill Dancer (IRE); 1993	Mira Adonde (USA)	Lettre d'Amour
Dam Devoted To You (IRE) 2007	Alleged Devotion (USA); 1988	Alleged	Hoist The Flag
Dam Devoted To You (IRE) 2007	Alleged Devotion (USA); 1988	Alleged	Princess Pout
Dam Devoted To You (IRE) 2007	Alleged Devotion (USA); 1988	Morning Devotion	Affirmed
Dam Devoted To You (IRE) 2007	Alleged Devotion (USA); 1988	Morning Devotion	Morning Has Broken (Family 4-k)
