= Benbatl =

British-bred Thoroughbred racehorse

- Racing silks of Godolphin
- Sire: Dubawi
- Grandsire: Dubai Millennium
- Dam: Nahrain
- Damsire: Selkirk
- Sex: Stallion
- Foaled: 15 February 2014
- Country: United Kingdom
- Colour: Bay
- Breeder: Darley Stud
- Owner: Godolphin
- Trainer: Saeed bin Suroor
- Record: 24: 11-4-3
- Earnings: £5,929,902

Major wins
- Hampton Court Stakes (2017); Singspiel Stakes (2018, 2020); Al Rashidiya (2018); Dubai Turf (2018); Bayerisches Zuchtrennen (2018); Caulfield Stakes (2018); Joel Stakes (2019, 2021); Al Maktoum Challenge, Round 2 (2020)

Benbatl (foaled 15 February 2014) is a retired British Thoroughbred racehorse and breeding stallion. He was unraced as a two-year-old in 2016 but in the following year he won the Hampton Court Stakes and was placed in both the Craven Stakes and the Dante Stakes as well as finishing fifth in the Epsom Derby. In 2018 he began the season in Dubai where he won the Singspiel Stakes and the Al Rashidiya before defeating a strong international field in the Dubai Turf. On his return to Europe he won the Bayerisches Zuchtrennen in Germany and was then sent to Australia where he took the Caulfield Stakes and ran second in the Cox Plate. In 2019 he secured the first of two victories in the Joel Stakes. He won the Singspiel Stakes for a second time in 2020, and the Joel Stakes for a second time in 2021. At the end of the 2021 season he was retired to stud.

== Background ==
Benbatl is a bay horse with a white star bred in England by Sheikh Mohammed's Darley Stud and owned by the Godolphin organisation. He was sent into training with Saeed bin Suroor whose horses are based at Newmarket, Suffolk in summer but typically spend the winter at Godolphin's base in Dubai.

He was sired by Dubawi a top-class son of Dubai Millennium, whose wins included the Irish 2,000 Guineas and the Prix Jacques Le Marois. At stud, Dubawi has been a highly-successful breeding stallion, siring major winners such as Monterosso, Al Kazeem, Makfi, Lucky Nine and Night of Thunder. Benbatl is the first foal of his dam Nahrain who won the Prix de l'Opéra in 2011 and the Flower Bowl Invitational Stakes in 2012. Nahrain was a daughter of the Ribblesdale Stakes winner Bahr, who was in turn a granddaughter of La Mer.

== Racing career ==
=== 2017: three-year-old season ===
Benbatl made his racecourse debut on 2 April 2017 when he started the 15/8 favourite for a maiden race over seven furlongs at Doncaster Racecourse in which he was ridden by Josephine Gordon and won "readily" by seven lengths from eleven opponents. The colt was immediately moved up in class and distance for the Group 3 Craven Stakes over the Rowley Mile at Newmarket Racecourse and finished third behind Eminent and Rivet, beaten two lengths by the winner. At York Racecourse in May he contested the Group 2 Dante Stakes (a major trial race the Epsom Derby) over ten furlongs. He started the 4/1 favourite but after briefly taking the lead in the straight he was beaten into second place by the Mark Johnston-trained Permian, with Crystal Ocean and Rekindling in third and fourth.

In the 2017 Epsom Derby was the least-fancied of the three Godolphin runners and started a 20/1 outsider. After turning into the straight last of the eighteen runners he made steady progress and came home fifth behind Wings of Eagles, Cliffs of Moher, Cracksman and Eminent. Nineteen days later at Royal Ascot the colt started the 9/2 second choice in the betting behind the Aidan O'Brien-trained Orderofthegarter in the Group 3 Hampton Court Stakes over ten furlongs. Ridden by Oisin Murphy, he tracked the leaders, went to the front approaching the final furlong and stayed on strongly to win by half a length from Orderofthegarter. After the race Saeed bin Suroor said "today's trip was brilliant for him. He was in a nice position and kicked really well. He is a nice horse for the future. We will keep the options open. He could be anything".

Benbatl returned to the highest class and took on older horses for the first time in the King George VI and Queen Elizabeth Stakes at Ascot on 29 July. He never looked likely to win but "plugged on" in the straight to come home fifth behind Enable, Ulysses, Idaho and Highland Reel. On his final run of the year the colt failed to show his best form, finishing sixth when favourite for the Group 3 Superior Mile on heavy ground at Haydock Park in September.

=== 2018: four-year-old season ===
==== Winter and spring: Dubai ====
For the winter and early spring of 2018 Benbatl was relocated to Godolphin's racing base in Dubai was campaigned at Meydan Racecourse, being ridden in all his races by Oisin Murphy. He began his campaign in the Group 3 Singspiel Stakes over 1800 metre on 11 January in which he started favourite and won "comfortably" by two and quarter lengths from Emotionless. In the Group 2 Al Rashidiya over the same course and distance on 1 February he won "easily" by almost four lengths from Bay of Poets having taken the lead 300 metres from the finish. The colt was expected to complete a hat-trick in the Group 1 Jebel Hatta on 10 March but in a slowly-run race he was unable to run down Godolphin's outsider Blair House and was beaten three quarters of a length into second place.

Three weeks after the Jebel Hatta Benbatl met Blair House again in the Dubai Turf, with Murphy's mount starting the 4/1 favourite. Among the other 13 runners were Coolmore's Lancaster Bomber, the Darley Stakes winner Monarch's Glen and a five-horse Japanese contingent including Vivlos (winner of the race in 2017), Real Steel (winner in 2016) and Neorealism (Queen Elizabeth II Cup). After tracking the front-runner Janoobi, Benbatl took the lead in the straight and drew away to win easily by more than three lengths from Vivlos. Murphy commented "Last time [in the Jebel Hatta] I gave the horse a bad ride and it was very good of Sheikh Mohammed and Saeed to give me another chance on him. I was determined to make amends and once in that position I was pretty sure I would win. It's very hard to find a world-class horse to ride, but he is a horse you dream about. He's very talented and today he had a good trip and showed his class. Today everything fell right."

==== Summer: Europe ====
On his first appearance after his return to Europe, Benbatl started 11/4 favourite against twelve opponents in the Group 1 Queen Anne Stakes over one mile at Royal Ascot in June. Ridden by Christophe Soumillon he was among the early leaders and briefly gained the advantage two furlongs out before fading badly and coming home in tenth place behind the 33/1 upset winner Accidental Agent. He was then moved back up in trip and sent to Germany for the Group 1 Bayerisches Zuchtrennen over 2000 metres at Munich on 29 July. The only other foreign challenger was the British-trained Stormy Antarctic, while the seven German runners were headed by Iquitos, the 2016 German Horse of the Year. With Murphy in the saddle, Benbatl took the lead soon after the start and drew away from his rivals in the straight to win by two and three quarter lengths from Stormy Antarctic. Saeed bin Suroor said "He made all and the pace suited him as he was still on the bridle with two furlongs to go. I'm very pleased with him and we'll now look at our options", suggesting that the colt might be sent to Australia to take on the great mare Winx in the Cox Plate.

On his third and final European start of 2018, Benbatl was ridden by Jim Crowley when he was sent off at odds of 10/1 for the International Stakes over ten and a half furlongs at York Racecourse on 22 August. He briefly took the lead approaching the last quarter mile but was soon overtaken and came home fifth behind Roaring Lion, Poet's Word, Thundering Blue and Saxon Warrior. He was struck into during the race and sustained cuts to his legs. After the race he entered quarantine to prepare for his journey to Australia.

==== Autumn: Australia ====
Benbatl arrived in Australia on 29 September as part of a large Godolphin team which also included Blair House and Best Solution. On 13 October he made his Australian debut in the Group 1 Ladbrokes Stakes (better known as the Caulfield Stakes) over 2000 metres at Caulfield Racecourse and started at odds of 8/1 in an eleven-runner field which included his fellow imports Blair House and Cliffs of Moher. The Rosehill Guineas winner D'Argento started favourite while the other local runners included Humidor (Memsie Stakes, Australian Cup), Unforgotten (Australian Oaks) and Homesman (Underwood Stakes). After breaking quickly from the starting stalls, Benbatl was settled in second place by his new jockey Pat Cosgrave as Homesman set the pace. He took the lead approaching the last 200 metres and got the better of a sustained struggle with his old rival Blair House to win by a short head. When asked about the colt's prospects against Winx in the Cox Plate Cosgrave said "I think he is going to be on his A-game to win that is for sure. She's a great mare. I don't know if I want to ride him. If I did happen to beat her I would have to scurry out of the country fairly quick". On 27 October Benbatl started second favourite for the Cox Plate at Moonee Valley Racecourse After settling in third behind Rostropovich and D'Argento he moved up on the outside to dispute the lead on the final turn. He was soon overtaken by Winx, but kept on well for second, two lengths behind the winner. His rider Oisin Murphy said "Winx was completely dominant. I gave it my best shot and so did Benbatl... I thought I’d give her a race and in fairness to him, he didn’t stop. He hit the line but she was just too good. Full credit to everyone".

In the 2018 World's Best Racehorse Rankings Benbatl was given a rating of 123, making him the fourteenth best horse in the world.

=== 2019: five-year-old season ===
Benbatl was given a long break in 2019 and did not return to the track until 27 September when he contested the Group 2 Joel Stakes over one mile at Newmarket and started 4/1 second favourite behind the three-year-old King of Comedy. He was sent into the lead by Murphy from the start and drew away in the final furlong to beat King of Comedy by five lengths. Saeed bin Suroor indicated that the horse would be aimed at the Queen Elizabeth II Stakes while Murphy commented "I haven't slept much this week with excitement. There was no pressure on today as it was a prep run, but he hasn't had a slap and he was electric. It's a fantastic feeling. He is the best around". On his only other race of the year he started favourite for the Champion Stakes at Ascot in October but appeared to be unsuited by the heavy ground and finished last of the sixteen runners.

In the 2019 World's Best Racehorse Rankings Benbatl was given a rating of 125, making him the ninth best racehorse in the world.

=== 2020: six-year-old season ===
As in 2018 Benbatl began his next campaign in Dubai where he was ridden by Soumillon in two races at Meydan. On 9 January he went off the 1/8 favourite for the Singspiel Stakes (now a Group 2 race) and led from the start before drawing away in the last 200 metres and winning "easily" by almost five lengths. Soumillon commented "He really dominated the race... today was like a morning gallop on his own." Four weeks later the horse made his debut on dirt in the 1900 metre Al Maktoum Challenge, Round 2 and started the joint-favourite alongside Gronkowski. After settling just behind the leaders Benbatl went to the front 500 metres from the finish and recorded another easy win, coming home two lengths clear of Military Law. After the race Soumillon said "He seemed happy on the surface and then really quickened when I asked. We knew he was a very good horse and now we know he can handle the dirt so it gives the owners and trainer a lot of exciting options."

Benbatl ran for the second time on dirt when he contested the inaugural $20 million Saudi Cup on February 29 over a distance of 1800 metres at King Abdulaziz Racetrack in Riyadh. With Murphy in the saddle he raced in mid-division before staying on in the straight and took third place behind Maximum Security and Midnight Bisou with Mucho Gusto, Tacitus and McKinzie finishing behind. He was expected to reappear in the Dubai World Cup in March, but the meeting was abandoned as a result of the COVID-19 pandemic.

After an absence of almost seven months Benbatl returned to the track at Newmarket in September and attempted to repeat his 2019 success in the Joel Stakes. Although he started favourite, Murphy opted to ride the three-year-old Kameko, and Benbatl was partnered by Frankie Dettori. He led for most of the way before being overtaken in the closing stages and finishing third behind Kameko and Regal Reality.

In the 2020 World's Best Racehorse Rankings, Benbatl was rated on 118, making him the equal 80th best racehorse in the world.

=== 2021: seven-year-old season ===
Benbatl was kept out of training in the early part of the season due to injury. He returned to the racecourse on 28 August 2021 to contest the Celebration Mile at Goodwood. Ridden by Murphy, he went off at 9/4 favourite and was beaten a short head by 9/1 chance Lavender's Blue. The following month saw Benbatl secure victory in the Joel Stakes for the second time, again ridden by Murphy. His last appearance of the season was in the Queen Elizabeth II Stakes at Ascot where, ridden by Pat Cosgrave, he started at 33/1 finished ninth of ten runners.

In November 2021 it was announced that Benbatl had retired and would stand as a stallion at Big Red Farm in Japan.

== Pedigree ==
Pedigree of Benbatl (GB), bay horse, 2014
Sire Dubawi (IRE) 2002	Dubai Millennium (GB); 1996	Seeking the Gold (USA)	Mr. Prospector
Sire Dubawi (IRE) 2002	Dubai Millennium (GB); 1996	Seeking the Gold (USA)	Con Game
Sire Dubawi (IRE) 2002	Dubai Millennium (GB); 1996	Colorado Dancer (IRE)	Shareef Dancer (USA)
Sire Dubawi (IRE) 2002	Dubai Millennium (GB); 1996	Colorado Dancer (IRE)	Fall Aspen (USA)
Sire Dubawi (IRE) 2002	Zomaradah (GB); 1995	Deploy	Shirley Heights
Sire Dubawi (IRE) 2002	Zomaradah (GB); 1995	Deploy	Slightly Dangerous (USA)
Sire Dubawi (IRE) 2002	Zomaradah (GB); 1995	Jawaher (IRE)	Dancing Brave (USA)
Sire Dubawi (IRE) 2002	Zomaradah (GB); 1995	Jawaher (IRE)	High Tern
Dam Nahrain (GB) 2008	Selkirk (USA); 1988	Sharpen Up (GB)	Atan (USA)
Dam Nahrain (GB) 2008	Selkirk (USA); 1988	Sharpen Up (GB)	Rocchetta
Dam Nahrain (GB) 2008	Selkirk (USA); 1988	Annie Edge (IRE)	Nebbiolo (GB)
Dam Nahrain (GB) 2008	Selkirk (USA); 1988	Annie Edge (IRE)	Friendly Court
Dam Nahrain (GB) 2008	Bahr (GB); 1995	Generous (IRE)	Caerleon (USA)
Dam Nahrain (GB) 2008	Bahr (GB); 1995	Generous (IRE)	Doff the Derby (USA)
Dam Nahrain (GB) 2008	Bahr (GB); 1995	Lady of the Sea (IRE)	Mill Reef (USA)
Dam Nahrain (GB) 2008	Bahr (GB); 1995	Lady of the Sea (IRE)	La Mer (NZ) (Family 6-d)
