= 2017 Epsom Derby =

- Epsom Derby
- Location: Epsom Downs Racecourse
- Date: 3 June 2017
- Winning horse: Wings of Eagles
- Starting price: 40/1
- Jockey: Padraig Beggy
- Trainer: Aidan O'Brien
- Owner: Derrick Smith, Michael Tabor and Susan Magnier
- Conditions: Good

Epsom Derby 2017
1-2-3
Wings of Eagles	Cliffs of Moher	Cracksman

Also Ran
4-5-6
Eminent	Benbatl	Capri
7-8-9
Douglas Macarthur	Best Solution	Glencadam Glory
10-11-12
Permian	Dubai Thunder	Venice Beach
13-14-15
Salouen	Khalidi	Crowned Eagle
16-17-18
Rekindling	The Anvil	Pealer

The 2017 Epsom Derby was the 238th annual running of the Derby horse race and took place at Epsom Downs Racecourse on 3 June 2017. It was televised on ITV for the first time since 1988. The race was worth £1.5million, an increase on the 2016 prize, and was sponsored by Investec. The race saw the biggest Derby upset for 43 years as Wings of Eagles won at odds of 40/1. His win was the seventh in the race for his owners and the sixth for his trainer Aidan O'Brien. By contrast, it was a first ride in the race for the winning jockey Padraig Beggy, a work-rider at O'Brien's Ballydoyle stable.

== Entries ==
The initial entry for the 2017 Epsom Derby, announced in December 2015, consisted of 416 yearlings. The number of entries was a decrease of 59 on the initial entry for the 2016 race, and included 54 horses from the Godolphin Racing organisation and 59 from the Coolmore Stud. Another 10 horses were added at the second entry stage in April 2017 at a cost of £9,000 per entry. The second entries included Thunder Snow, winner of the 2017 UAE Derby; he was subsequently routed to the US to contest the 2017 Kentucky Derby. A further entry stage took place on 29 May 2017, and saw two horses, Permian and Khalidi added to the line-up after their owners each paid supplementary fees of £85,000. The two-day declarations on 1 June saw the withdrawal of the outsider Finn McCool leaving a field of nineteen horses.

The most controversial entry was Diore Lia, a filly who had shown no racing ability in two starts and who was scheduled to be ridden by the inexperienced apprentice jockey Gina Mangan. After safety concerns were raised the BHA allowed the horse to take part but insisted that Mangan be replaced by a more qualified rider. The filly was withdrawn on the morning of the race after sustaining a muscle injury. Later, the owner of Diore Lia were banned from horse racing actives, British Horseracing Authority also banned horses rated below 80 in group 1 races except for two years old only races.

== Trial races ==
Ireland staged the first notable trial for the 2017 English Derby when the Ballysax Stakes was run at Leopardstown Racecourse on 8 April and produced a considerable upset as Joseph O'Brien sent out Rekindling to win at odds of 16/1. Douglas Macarthur, Yucatan and Capri, the next three finishers, were all trained by O'Brien's father Aidan and represented the powerful Coolmore organisation. The first significant British trial races took place at the Craven meeting at Newmarket Racecourse in April. The Listed Feilden Stakes over nine furlongs on Tuesday 18 saw the John Gosden trained Khalidi prevail by a neck over the betting favourite Salouen. In the Group 3 Craven Stakes (primarily a trial for the 2000 Guineas) over one mile two days later Eminent (from the first crop of foals sired by Frankel) scored an upset victory over Rivet with Godolphins Benbatl in third place. In the following week Epsom Racecourse staged the ten-furlong Investec Derby Trial, and in a very tight finish, Cracksman, from the Gosden stable, caught the Mark Johnston-trained Permian in the final stride to win by a short head.

The 2000 Guineas at Newmarket on 6 May was won by Churchill with Eminent in sixth place. Churchill had been the winter favourite for the Derby but his connections opted not to follow the Epsom route, deciding to keep the horse to shorter distances. On the same day Permian won the ten furlong Newmarket Stakes, beating Speedo Boy by four and a half lengths with the favoured Khalidi in third place. On the following day Leopardstown staged the Derrinstown Stud Derby Trial which resulted in a clean sweep for the Aidan O'Brien stable as Douglas Macarthur won in a three-way photo-phinish from his stablemates Yucatan and Capri. At Chester Racecourse the following week the O'Brien domination continued with a 1-2-3 in the Chester Vase as Venice Beach won from Wings of Eagles and The Anvil. Two days later at the same meeting O'Brien sent out Cliffs of Moher to win the Dee Stakes at odds of 4/5. The Lingfield Derby Trial on the 13 May saw a victory for Godolphin as Best Solution, who had spent the early part of 2017 in Dubai, won by three and a quarter lengths from Glencadam Glory. The Dante Stakes at York Racecourse on 18 May attracted its usual strong field and saw Permian win from Benbatl, Crystal Ocean (a highly regarded colt from the Michael Stoute yard) and Rekindling. The last major trial was the Listed Cocked Hat Stakes over eleven furlongs at Goodwood Racecourse on 26 May which resulted in a five length win for Khalidi.

== Race card ==
The final field of eighteen saw seven Irish-trained challengers matched against eleven British-trained colts. Fourteen of the runners were supplied by three major stables: Aidan O'Brien (six runners), John Gosden (five) and Saeed bin Suroor (three). The only female jockey was Anastasia "Ana" O'Brien who became the third woman to ride in the race after Alex Greaves and Hayley Turner.

No	Draw	Horse	Weight (st–lb)	Jockey	Trainer	Owner
1	16	Benbatl	9–0	Oisin Murphy	Saeed bin Suroor	Godolphin
2	8	Best Solution (IRE)	9–0	Pat Cosgrave	Saeed bin Suroor	Godolphin
3	10	Capri (IRE)	9–0	Seamie Heffernan	Aidan O'Brien (IRE)	Tabor, Smith, Magnier
4	13	Cliffs of Moher (IRE)	9–0	Ryan Moore	Aidan O'Brien (IRE)	Tabor, Smith, Magnier
5	7	Cracksman	9–0	Frankie Dettori	John Gosden	Anthony Oppenheimer
6	12	Crowned Eagle	9–0	Andrea Atzeni	John Gosden	Lady Bamford
7	19	Douglas Macarthur (IRE)	9–0	Colm O'Donoghue	Aidan O'Brien (IRE)	Jooste, Tabor, Smith, Magnier
8	1	Dubai Thunder	9–0	Adam Kirby	Saeed bin Suroor	Godolphin
9	4	Eminent (IRE)	9–0	Jim Crowley	Martyn Meade	Peter Vela
10	18	Glencadam Glory	9–0	James Doyle	John Gosden	Angus Dundee Distillers
11	6	Khalidi	9–0	Pat Smullen	John Gosden	Nizar Anwar
12	5	Pealer (GER)	9–0	Silvestre de Sousa	John Gosden	Capon, Lloyd Webber, Hood
13	3	Permian (IRE)	9–0	William Buick	Mark Johnston	Hamdan bin Mohammed Al Maktoum
14	15	Rekindling	9–0	Wayne Lordan	Joseph O'Brien (IRE)	Lloyd Williams
15	11	Salouen (IRE)	9–0	Fran Berry	Sylvester Kirk	H Balasuriya
16	2	The Anvil (IRE)	9–0	Ana O'Brien	Aidan O'Brien (IRE)	Tabor, Smith, Magnier, O'Brien
17	9	Venice Beach (IRE)	9–0	Donnacha O'Brien	Aidan O'Brien (IRE)	Tabor, Smith, Magnier, Flaxman
18	14	Wings of Eagles (FR)	9–0	Padraig Beggy	Aidan O'Brien (IRE)	Tabor, Smith, Magnier

Trainers are based in Great Britain unless indicated.

Diore Lia was number 19 on the card, drawn 17, but was a non-runner.

== Race ==
The race took place in fine, sunny weather on a surface officially described as "good". On the morning of the race Cracksman and Cliffs of Moher were disputing favouritism but by race time Cracksman headed the betting on 7/2 with Cliffs of Moher on 5/1 alongside Eminent. The best-supported of the other runners were Permian (8/1) and the inexperienced Dubai Thunder (9/1). When the race began, the Aidan O'Brien-trained Douglas Macarthur went to the front ahead of his stablemate The Anvil, and the pair quickly opened up a lead of several lengths over the rest of the field. As the field turned into the straight, Douglas Macarthur still led from The Anvil, Venice Beach, Best Solution and Cracksman, whilst Cliffs of Moher, Eminent and the 40/1 outsider Wings of Eagles were towards the rear. The Anvil and Venice Beach dropped back but Douglas Macarthur maintained his gallop and briefly went clear of the field before being overtaken by Cracksman approaching the final furlong. The favourite was soon challenged as both Cliffs of Moher and Eminent made strong late challenges and Wings of Eagles made rapid progress from the rear. Cliffs of Moher headed Cracksman in the closing stages but was in turn overtaken by Wings of Eagles who won by three-quarters of a length. Cracksman held on for third ahead of Eminent with a gap of three and a half lengths back to Benbatl in fifth. Wings of Eagles was the longest-priced winner of the race since Snow Knight triumphed at 50/1 in 1974.

== Full result ==
	Dist *	Horse	Jockey	Trainer	SP
1		Wings of Eagles	Padraig Beggy	Aidan O'Brien	40/1
2	¾	Cliffs of Moher	Ryan Moore	Aidan O'Brien	5/1
3	nk	Cracksman	Frankie Dettori	John Gosden	7/2 fav
4	¾	Eminent	Jim Crowley	Martyn Meade	5/1
5	1¾	Benbatl	Oisin Murphy	Saeed bin Suroor	20/1
6	nk	Capri	Seamie Heffernan	Aidan O'Brien	16/1
7	1	Douglas Macarthur	Colm O'Donoghue	Aidan O'Brien	25/1
8	1¾	Best Solution	Pat Cosgrave	Saeed bin Suroor	12/1
9	1¼	Glencadam Glory	James Doyle	John Gosden	33/1
10	nk	Permian	William Buick	Mark Johnston	8/1
11	nk	Dubai Thunder	Adam Kirby	Saeed bin Suroor	9/1
12	2½	Venice Beach	Donnacha O'Brien	Aidan O'Brien	12/1
13	½	Salouen	Fran Berry	Sylvester Kirk	33/1
14	2¼	Khalidi	Pat Smullen	John Gosden	20/1
15	2¼	Crowned Eagle	Andrea Atzeni	John Gosden	33/1
16	2¼	Rekindling	Wayne Lordan	Joseph O'Brien	25/1
17	5	The Anvil	Ana O'Brien	Aidan O'Brien	66/1
18	10	Pealer	Silvestre de Sousa	John Gosden	100/1

* The distances between the horses are shown in lengths or shorter; nse = nose; hd = head.
† Trainers are based in Great Britain unless indicated.

== Form analysis ==
=== Two-year-old races ===
Notable runs by the future Derby participants as two-year-olds in 2016

- Best Solution – 1st in Autumn Stakes, 2nd in Critérium de Saint-Cloud, 4th in Somerville Tattersall Stakes
- Capri – 1st in Beresford Stakes, 1st in El Gran Senor Stakes, 3rd in Critérium de Saint-Cloud
- Douglas Macarthur – 3rd in Juvenile Stakes, 4th in Critérium de Saint-Cloud, 5th in Royal Lodge Stakes
- Permian – 3rd in Zetland Stakes
- Rekindling – 13th in Critérium de Saint-Cloud
- Salouen – 2nd in Prix Jean-Luc Lagardère, 2nd in Solario Stakes, 3rd in Racing Post Trophy
- The Anvil – 2nd in Royal Lodge Stakes, 4th in Autumn Stakes, 10th in Racing Post Trophy
- Wings of Eagles – 4th in Zetland Stakes, 9th in Critérium de Saint-Cloud

=== Road to Epsom ===
Early-season appearances in 2017 and trial races prior to running in the Derby:

- Benbatl – 2nd in Dante Stakes, 3rd in Craven Stakes
- Best Solution – 1st in Lingfield Derby Trial, 8th in UAE 2000 Guineas
- Capri – 3rd in Derrinstown Stud Derby Trial, 4th in Ballysax Stakes
- Cliffs of Moher – 1st in Dee Stakes
- Cracksman – 1st in Investec Derby Trial
- Douglas Macarthur – 1st in Derrinstown Stud Derby Trial, 2nd in Ballysax Stakes
- Eminent – 1st Craven Stakes, 6th 2000 Guineas
- Glencadam Glory – 2nd in Lingfield Derby Trial
- Khalidi – 1st in Feilden Stakes, 1st in Cocked Hat Stakes, 3rd in Newmarket Stakes
- Permian – 1st in Newmarket Stakes, 1st in Dante Stakes, 2nd in Investec Derby Trial
- Rekindling – 1st in Ballysax Stakes, 4th in Dante Stakes
- Salouen – 2nd in Feilden Stakes
- The Anvil – 3rd in Chester Vase
- Venice Beach – 1st in Chester Vase
- Wings of Eagles – 2nd in Chester Vase

=== Subsequent Group 1 wins ===
Group 1 / Grade I victories after running in the Derby:

- Benbatl – Dubai Turf (2018), Bayerisches Zuchtrennen (2018), Ladbrokes Stakes (2018)
- Best Solution – Grosser Preis von Berlin (2018), Grosser Preis von Baden (2018), Caulfield Cup (2018)
- Capri – Irish Derby (2017), St Leger (2017)
- Cracksman – Champion Stakes (2017, 2018), Prix Ganay (2018), Coronation Cup (2018)
- Rekindling – Melbourne Cup (2017)
