= 2019 World's Best Racehorse Rankings =

The 2019 World's Best Racehorse Rankings, sponsored by Longines was the 2019 edition of the World's Best Racehorse Rankings. It was an assessment of Thoroughbred racehorses issued by the International Federation of Horseracing Authorities (IFHA) on 22 January 2020. It included horses aged three or older which competed in flat races during 2019. It was open to all horses irrespective of where they raced or were trained.

For the first time, the rankings saw a three-way tie for first place between the European five-years-old Crystal Ocean, Enable and Waldgeist. The top rating of 128 was the lowest in the history of the rankings. The top-rated three-years-old fillies Covfefe and Gran Alegria failed to make the top 100.

== Rankings for 2019 ==
- For a detailed guide to this table, see below.

Rank	Rating	Horse	Age	Sex	Trained	Surface	Cat.
1	128	Crystal Ocean (GB)	5	H	GB	Turf	L
1	128	Enable (GB)	5	M	GB	Turf	L
1	128	Waldgeist (GB)	5	H	FR	Turf	L
4	127	Beauty Generation (NZ)	7	G	HK	Turf	M
5	126	Battaash (IRE)	5	G	GB	Turf	S
5	126	Ghaiyyath (IRE)	4	C	GB	Turf	L
5	126	Lys Gracieux (JPN)	5	M	JPN	Turf	L
5	126	Vino Rosso (USA)	4	C	USA	Dirt	I
9	125	Benbatl (GB)	5	H	GB	Turf	M
9	125	Glory Vase (JPN)	4	C	JPN	Turf	L
9	124	Winx (AUS)	8	M	AUS	Turf	M, I
12	124	Almond Eye (JPN)	4	F	JPN	Turf	I
12	124	Blue Point (IRE)	5	H	GB	Turf	S
12	124	City of Light (USA)	5	H	USA	Dirt	M
12	124	Santa Ana Lane (AUS)	7	G	AUS	Turf	S
16	123	McKinzie (USA)	4	C	USA	Dirt	M
16	123	Mitole (USA)	4	C	USA	Dirt	S
16	123	Sottsass (FR)	3	C	FR	Turf	L
19	122	Bricks and Mortar (USA)	5	H	USA	Turf	I
19	122	Code of Honor (USA)	3	C	USA	Dirt	I
19	122	Happy Clapper (AUS)	9	G	AUS	Turf	M
19	122	Japan (GB)	3	C	IRE	Turf	I, L
19	122	Magical (IRE)	4	F	IRE	Turf	I, L
19	122	Maximum Security (USA)	3	C	USA	Dirt	M
19	122	Nature Strip (AUS)	5	G	AUS	Turf	S
19	122	Old Persian (GB)	4	C	GB	Turf	L
19	122	Stradivarius (IRE)	5	H	GB	Turf	E
19	122	Ten Sovereigns (IRE)	3	C	IRE	Turf	S
29	121	Beat The Clock (AUS)	6	G	HK	Turf	S
29	121	Do It Again (SAF)	5	G	SAF	Turf	L
29	121	Mustashry (GB)	6	G	GB	Turf	M
29	121	Suave Richard (JPN)	5	H	JPN	Turf	L
29	121	Thunder Snow (IRE)	5	H	UAE	Dirt	I
29	121	Too Darn Hot (GB)	3	C	GB	Turf	M
35	120	Aethero (AUS)	3	G	HK	Turf	S
35	120	Blast Onepiece (JPN)	4	C	JPN	Turf	I
35	120	Castelvecchio (AUS)	3	C	AUS	Turf	I
35	120	Elarqam (GB)	4	C	GB	Turf	I
35	120	Exultant (IRE)	5	G	HK	Turf	I, M
35	120	Gift Box (USA)	6	H	USA	Dirt	I
35	120	Gronkowski (USA)	4	C	USA	Dirt	I
35	120	Hartnell (GB)	8	G	AUS	Turf	M
35	120	Hawwaam (SAF)	4	C	SAF	Turf	I, M
35	120	Hot King Prawn (AUS)	5	G	HK	Turf	S
35	120	Imperial Hint (USA)	6	H	USA	Dirt	S
35	120	Indy Champ (JPN)	4	C	JPN	Turf	M
35	120	King of Change (GB)	3	C	GB	Turf	M
35	120	Kiseki (JPN)	5	H	JPN	Turf	L
35	120	Magna Grecia (IRE)	3	C	IRE	Turf	M
35	120	Omaha Beach (USA)	3	C	USA	Dirt	S
35	120	Roy H (USA)	7	G	USA	Dirt	S
35	120	Saturnalia (JPN)	3	C	JPN	Turf	L
35	120	Shancealot (USA)	3	C	USA	Dirt	S
35	120	Trapeze Artist (AUS)	5	H	AUS	Turf	S
35	120	Win Bright (JPN)	5	H	JPN	Turf	I
35	120	Yes Yes Yes (AUS)	3	C	AUS	Turf	S
57	119	Addeybb (IRE)	6	G	GB	Turf	M
57	119	Advertise (GB)	3	C	GB	Turf	S
57	119	Avilius (GB)	5	G	AUS	Turf	M, I, L
57	119	Cheval Grand (JPN)	7	H	JPN	Turf	L
57	119	Danon Premium (JPN)	4	C	JPN	Turf	I
57	119	Dee Ex Bee (GB)	4	C	GB	Turf	E
57	119	Fierement (JPN)	4	C	JPN	Turf	E
57	119	Kew Gardens (IRE)	4	C	IRE	Turf	E
57	119	Midnight Bisou (USA)	4	F	USA	Dirt	M
57	119	Mr Stunning (AUS)	7	G	HK	Turf	S
57	119	Phoenix of Spain (IRE)	3	C	GB	Turf	E
57	119	Pierata (AUS)	5	H	AUS	Turf	S
57	119	Rainbow Bridge (SAF)	5	G	SAF	Turf	L
57	119	Regal Reality (GB)	4	C	GB	Turf	I
57	119	Roger Barows (JPN)	3	C	JPN	Turf	L
57	119	Soqrat (AUS)	4	C	SAF	Turf	M, I
57	119	Spun To Run (USA)	4	C	USA	Dirt	M
57	119	Sungrazer (JPN)	5	H	JPN	Turf	I
57	119	The Revenant (GB)	4	G	FR	Turf	M
57	119	World Premiere (JPN)	3	C	JPN	Turf	L
57	119	Yoshida (USA)	5	H	USA	Dirt	M
78	118	Admire Mars (JPN)	3	C	JPN	Turf	M
78	118	Al Ain (JPN)	5	H	JPN	Turf	L
78	118	Anthony Van Dyck (IRE)	3	C	IRE	Turf	L
78	118	Barahin (SAF)	4	C	SAF	Turf	M
78	118	Bivouac (AUS)	3	C	AUS	Turf	S, M
78	118	Blue Prize (ARG)	6	M	USA	Dirt	M
78	118	Brave Smash (JPN)	6	H	JPN	Turf	S
78	118	Chrysoberyl (JPN)	3	C	JPN	Dirt	M
78	118	Circus Maximus (IRE)	3	C	IRE	Turf	M
78	118	Country House (USA)	3	C	USA	Dirt	I
78	118	Cross Counter (GB)	4	G	GB	Turf	E
78	118	Danon Kingly (JPN)	4	C	JPN	Turf	M, I, L
78	118	Defoe (GB)	5	G	GB	Turf	L
78	118	Donjuan Triumphant (IRE)	6	H	GB	Turf	S
78	118	Exceedance (AUS)	3	C	AUS	Turf	S
78	118	French King (GB)	4	C	FR	Turf	L
78	118	Hello Youmzain (FR)	3	C	GB	Turf	S
78	118	King of Comedy (IRE)	3	C	GB	Turf	I
78	118	Le Romain (AUS)	7	G	AUS	Turf	M
78	118	Logician (GB)	3	C	GB	Turf	E
78	118	Master of Reality (IRE)	4	G	IRE	Turf	E
78	118	Mystic Journey (AUS)	4	F	AUS	Turf	M
78	118	North America (GB)	7	G	UAE	Dirt	M
78	118	Osborne Bulls (AUS)	6	G	AUS	Turf	S
78	118	Redzel (AUS)	7	G	AUS	Turf	S
78	118	Romanised (GB)	4	C	IRE	Turf	M
78	118	Sistercharlie (IRE)	5	M	USA	Turf	M
78	118	Sovereign (IRE)	3	C	IRE	Turf	L
78	118	Stelvio (JPN)	4	C	JPN	Turf	M
78	118	Te Akau Shark (NZ)	5	G	NZ	Turf	M
78	118	Uni (GB)	5	M	USA	Turf	M
78	118	United (USA)	4	G	USA	Turf	L
78	118	Velox (JPN)	3	C	JPN	Turf	I
78	118	You Can Smile (JPN)	4	C	JPN	Turf	I

== Guide ==
A complete guide to the main table above.

Rank
A horse's position in the list, with the most highly rated at number 1. Each horse is ranked once according to its highest rating. Any lesser ratings for the same horse are not ranked.

Rating
A rating represents a weight value in pounds, with higher values given to horses which showed greater ability. It is judged that these weights would equalise the abilities of the horses if carried in a theoretical handicap race. The minimum rating required for inclusion is 115.

Horse
Each horse's name is followed by a suffix (from the IFHA's International Code of Suffixes) which indicates the country foaled.

Age
The age of the horse at the time it achieved its rating. The racing ages of all horses foaled in a particular part of the world increase simultaneously, regardless of the actual date of foaling.
Dates of age increase by location foaled
Northern Hemisphere	1 January
South America	1 July
Australia, New Zealand and South Africa	1 August

Sex
C	Colt	Ungelded male horse up to four-years-old
F	Filly	Female horse up to four-years-old
H	Horse	Ungelded male horse over four-years-old
M	Mare	Female horse over four-years-old
G	Gelding	Gelded male horse of any age

Trained
The country where the horse was trained at the time of the rating, abbreviated using the International Code of Suffixes.

Position
The horse's finishing position in the race shown. The actual finishing order can sometimes be amended following an inquiry or a disqualification.
=	Dead-heat
↑	Promoted from original finishing position
↓	Relegated from original finishing position

Race
The race (or one of the races) for which the horse achieved its rating. A defeated horse can be rated above its higher-placed opponents if it carried more weight.

Surface
The surface of the track on which the race was run, eg. turf or dirt. Synthetic surfaces are described as "artificial".

Distance
The distance of the race in metres. In some countries (eg. Canada, Great Britain, Ireland and the United States), the length of a race is usually expressed in miles and furlongs. These units have been converted to metres to allow for universal comparison.
Common conversions
5 furlongs	= 1,006 m	1 mile and 1½ furlongs	= 1,911 m
6 furlongs	= 1,207 m	1 mile and 2 furlongs	= 2,012 m
6½ furlongs	= 1,308 m	1 mile and 2½ furlongs	= 2,112 m
7 furlongs	= 1,408 m	1 mile and 3 furlongs	= 2,213 m
7½ furlongs	= 1,509 m	1 mile and 4 furlongs	= 2,414 m
1 mile	= 1,609 m	1 mile and 6 furlongs	= 2,816 m
1 mile and ½ furlong	= 1,710 m	2 miles	= 3,219 m
1 mile and 1 furlong	= 1,811 m	2 miles and 4 furlongs	= 4,023 m

Category
		Metres	Furlongs
S	Sprint	1,000–1,300; 1,000–1,599 (CAN / USA)	5–6.5; 5–7.99 (CAN / USA)
M	Mile	1,301–1,899; 1,600–1,899 (CAN / USA)	6.51–9.49; 8–9.49 (CAN / USA)
I	Intermediate	1,900–2,100	9.5–10.5
L	Long	2,101–2,700	10.51–13.5
E	Extended	2,701+	13.51+

International Code of Suffixes
The following countries have been represented in the WTR as foaling or training locations since the first edition in 2004.
ARG	Argentina	ITY	Italy
AUS	Australia	JPN	Japan
BRZ	Brazil	KSA	Saudi Arabia
CAN	Canada	NZ	New Zealand
CHI	Chile	SAF	South Africa
CZE	Czech Republic	SIN	Singapore
FR	France	SPA	Spain
GB	Great Britain	TUR	Turkey
GER	Germany	UAE	United Arab Emirates
HK	Hong Kong	USA	United States
HUN	Hungary	VEN	Venezuela
IRE	Ireland	ZIM	Zimbabwe

Shading
The shaded areas represent lesser ratings recorded by horses which were more highly rated in a different category. The IFHA publishes this information when the lower rating is the overall top performance in a particular category.
