= 2019 Epsom Derby =

240th running of the annual Derby horse race

- Epsom Derby
- Location: Epsom Downs Racecourse
- Date: 1 June 2019
- Winning horse: Anthony Van Dyck
- Jockey: Seamie Heffernan
- Trainer: Aidan O'Brien

Epsom Derby 2019
1-2-3
Anthony Van Dyck	Madhmoon	Japan

Also Ran
4-5-6
Broome	Sir Dragonet	Circus Maximus
7-8-9
Humanitarian	Norway	Line Of Duty
10-11-12
Sovereign	Hiroshima	Bangkok
13
Telecaster	13 Ran	2m 33.38s

The 2019 Epsom Derby was the 240th annual running of the Derby horse race and took place at Epsom Downs Racecourse on 1 June 2019. The race was sponsored by Investec. The winner was the Coolmore Stud's bay colt Anthony Van Dyck, ridden by Seamie Heffernan and trained at Ballydoyle in Ireland by Aidan O'Brien.

== Race synopsis ==
=== Entries and race build-up ===
The initial entry for the 2019 Epsom Derby, announced in December 2017, consisted of 338 yearlings whose owners paid £560 for each horse entered. The number of entries was a decrease of 110 on the initial entry for the 2018 race, and included 11 horses from the Godolphin organisation and 45 from the Coolmore Stud. Khalid Abdullah entered 18 horses and five-time winning owner Aga Khan IV had 22 entries. Queen Elizabeth II entered 5 horses for the race. A further 14 horses were added at the second entry stage in April 2019, at a cost to their owners of £9,000 for each horse entered. The second entries included three from Ireland and three from Godolphin, including eventual runners Line of Duty and Madhmoon. The Blue Riband Trial Stakes at Epsom on 24 April offered a free Derby entry to the winner; however the successful horse in 2019, Cape of Good Hope was already amongst the Derby entries. A final entry stage took place in May 2019 when Dante Stakes winner Telecaster and Chester Vase winner Sir Dragonet were added to the field at a cost of £85,000 each.

The field for the 2019 Derby took on its final shape on Thursday 30 May when thirteen horses were declared to run with entries Cape of Good Hope and Surfman being withdrawn in favour of a run in the French equivalent race, the Prix du Jockey Club. The runners included seven trained by Aidan O'Brien. Sir Dragonet was favourite at the time of the declaration at odds of 11 to 4, with Broome and Telecaster just behind in the betting at 9 to 2 and 5 to 1 respectively.

== Race card ==
No	Draw	Horse	Weight (st–lb)	Jockey	Trainer	Owner
1	7	Anthony Van Dyck	9–0	Seamie Heffernan	Aidan O'Brien (IRE)	Tabor, Smith, Magnier
2	12	Bangkok	9–0	Silvestre de Sousa	Andrew Balding	King Power Racing Co Ltd
3	8	Broome	9–0	Donnacha O'Brien	Aidan O'Brien (IRE)	Tabor, Smith, Magnier
4	5	Circus Maximus	9–0	Frankie Dettori	Aidan O'Brien (IRE)	Flaxman Stables, Tabor, Smith, Magnier
5	3	Hiroshima	9–0	Brett Doyle	John Ryan	Graham Smith-Bernal
6	9	Humanitarian	9–0	Robert Havlin	John Gosden	Sheikh Zayed bin Mohammed Racing
7	11	Japan	9–0	Wayne Lordan	Aidan O'Brien (IRE)	Tabor, Smith, Magnier
8	1	Line Of Duty	9–0	James Doyle	Charlie Appleby	Godolphin
9	6	Madhmoon	9–0	Chris Hayes	Kevin Prendergast (IRE)	Hamdan Al Maktoum
10	10	Norway	9–0	Jamie Spencer	Aidan O'Brien (IRE)	Tabor, Smith, Magnier
11	13	Sir Dragonet	9–0	Ryan Moore	Aidan O'Brien (IRE)	Tabor, Smith, Magnier
12	4	Sovereign	9–0	Padraig Beggy	Aidan O'Brien (IRE)	Tabor, Smith, Magnier
13	2	Telecaster	9–0	Oisin Murphy	Hughie Morrison	Castle Down Racing

Trainers are based in Great Britain unless indicated.

== The race ==
The race started at 4:33 pm in bright sunshine on ground officially described as good to firm. Sovereign set the early pace from Norway with Telecaster and Circus Maximus close behind ahead of Line of Duty and Sir Dragonet. The order remained largely unchanged until the horses entered the straight, where Sovereign gave way to Norway and the chasing group fanned out to obtain racing room. Approaching the last quarter mile Sir Dragonet hit the front closely pressed by Madhmoon to his left, while Broome began to make rapid headway on the outside. Entering the final furlong Sir Dragonet held a narrow lead over Madhmoon with Broome in third but new challengers emerged in the form of Anthony Van Dyck, who had been switched to the inside, and Japan who launched a run on the wide outside. In a "blanket finish" Anthony Van Dyck took the lead in the last 100 yards and prevailed by half a length with Madhmoon getting the better of Japan, Broome and Sir Dragonet in a four-way photo for second. Circus Maximus was four and a half lengths back in sixth, one place ahead of the first British-trained finisher Humanitarian.

== Full result ==
	Dist *	Horse	Jockey	Trainer	SP
1		Anthony Van Dyck	Seamie Heffernan	Aidan O'Brien (IRE)	13/2
2	½	Madhmoon	Chris Hayes	Kevin Prendergast (IRE)	10/1
3	nse	Japan	Wayne Lordan	Aidan O'Brien (IRE)	20/1
4	shd	Broome	Donnacha O'Brien	Aidan O'Brien (IRE)	4/1
5	shd	Sir Dragonet	Ryan Moore	Aidan O'Brien (IRE)	11/4 fav
6	4½	Circus Maximus	Frankie Dettori	Aidan O'Brien (IRE)	10/1
7	1¾	Humanitarian	Robert Havlin	John Gosden	33/1
8	shd	Norway	Jamie Spencer	Aidan O'Brien (IRE)	33/1
9	1	Line of Duty	James Doyle	Charlie Appleby	25/1
10	1¼	Sovereign	Padraig Beggy	Aidan O'Brien (IRE)	50/1
11	2¼	Hiroshima	Brett Doyle	John Ryan	100/1
12	1¼	Bangkok	Silvestre de Sousa	Andrew Balding	9/1
13	6	Telecaster	Oisin Murphy	Hughie Morrison	5/1

Winner's time: 2 min 33.38 sec
* The distances between the horses are shown in lengths or shorter; nse = nose; shd = short head.
† Trainers are based in Great Britain unless indicated.

== Records ==
Anthony Van Dyck gave Aidan O'Brien a seventh winner of the race after Galileo, High Chaparral, Camelot, Ruler of the World, Australia and Wings of Eagles, equaling the records of Robert Robson, John Porter and Fred Darling. The Coolmore partners Susan Magnier and Michael Tabor were winning the race for a record eighth time. The winning time of 2:33.38 was the seventh fastest time for the Derby at Epsom. The first six finishers were trained in Ireland, bettering the result of 2009 when the first five were Irish-trained. Seamie Heffernan won the race at his twelfth attempt, after finishing second in 2009 and 2010 and third in 2016 and 2017. Anthony Van Dyck's foaling date of 19 May was the latest of any Derby winner since Erhaab (24 May) in 1994.

== Form analysis ==
=== Two-year-old races ===
Notable runs by the future Derby participants as two-year-olds in 2018

- Anthony Van Dyck – 1st in Tyros Stakes, 1st in Futurity Stakes, 2nd in Vincent O'Brien National Stakes, 3rd in Dewhurst Stakes, 9th in Breeders' Cup Juvenile Turf
- Broome - 2nd in Prix Jean-Luc Lagardère, 2nd in Juvenile Stakes, 6th in Acomb Stakes
- Circus Maximus - 3rd in Autumn Stakes, 4th in Vertem Futurity Trophy
- Japan - 1st in Beresford Stakes
- Line of Duty - 1st in Prix de Condé, 1st in Breeders' Cup Juvenile Turf
- Madhmoon - 1st in Juvenile Stakes
- Norway - 1st in Zetland Stakes, 4th in Critérium de Saint-Cloud
- Sovereign - 3rd in Eyrefield Stakes, 4th in Beresford Stakes

=== Road to Epsom ===
Early-season appearances in 2018 and trial races prior to running in the Derby:

- Anthony Van Dyck - 1st in Lingfield Derby Trial
- Bangkok - 1st in Sandown Classic Trial
- Broome - 1st in Ballysax Stakes, 1st in Derrinstown Stud Derby Trial
- Circus Maximus - 1st in Dee Stakes
- Japan - 4th in Dante Stakes
- Madhmoon - 2nd in Leopardstown 2,000 Guineas Trial Stakes, 4th in 2000 Guineas
- Norway - 2nd in Chester Vase
- Sir Dragonet - 1st in Chester Vase
- Sovereign - 2nd in Ballysax Stakes, 3rd in Derrinstown Stud Derby Trial

=== Subsequent Group 1 wins ===
Group 1 / Grade I victories after running in the Derby:

- Broome - Grand Prix de Saint-Cloud (2021)
- Circus Maximus - St James's Palace Stakes (2019), Prix du Moulin (2019), Queen Anne Stakes (2020)
- Sovereign - Irish Derby (2019)
- Japan - Grand Prix de Paris (2019), International Stakes (2019)
- Sir Dragonet - Cox Plate (2019)

== See also ==
- 2019 British Champions Series
