= Crystal Ocean =

British-bred Thoroughbred racehorse

- Racing silks of Evelyn de Rothschild
- Sire: Sea The Stars
- Grandsire: Cape Cross
- Dam: Crystal Star
- Damsire: Mark of Esteem
- Sex: Stallion
- Foaled: 8 February 2014
- Country: United Kingdom
- Colour: Brown
- Breeder: Southcourt Stud
- Owner: Evelyn de Rothschild
- Trainer: Michael Stoute
- Record: 17: 8-7-2
- Earnings: £1,833,962

Major wins
- Gordon Stakes (2017); Gordon Richards Stakes (2018, 2019); Aston Park Stakes (2018, 2019); Hardwicke Stakes (2018); Prince of Wales's Stakes (2019)

Crystal Ocean (foaled 8 February 2014) is a British Thoroughbred racehorse. After finishing second on his only appearance as a juvenile he developed into a high-class middle-distance performer in the following year when he won the Gordon Stakes, finished second in the St Leger and was placed in both the Dante Stakes and the King Edward VII Stakes. He was even better in the following year when he took the Gordon Richards Stakes, Aston Park Stakes and Hardwicke Stakes before being narrowly beaten by his stablemate Poet's Word in the King George VI and Queen Elizabeth Stakes. He later finished second to Enable in the September Stakes and to Cracksman in the Champion Stakes. In 2019 he won his first Group One race when taking the Prince of Wales's Stakes but was retired to stud in September 2019 after suffered a career-ending leg injury on the gallops.

== Background ==
Crystal Ocean is a bay horse bred at the Rothschild family's Southcourt Stud near Leighton Buzzard in Bedfordshire. He raced in the colours of Evelyn de Rothschild and was sent into training with Michael Stoute at the Freemason Lodge Stables in Newmarket, Suffolk.

He is from the fourth crop of foals sired by Sea The Stars who won the 2000 Guineas, Epsom Derby and Prix de l'Arc de Triomphe in 2009. His other major winners have included Harzand, Taghrooda, Stradivarius and Sea The Moon. Crystal Ocean's dam Crystal Star won two races including the Radley Stakes and went on to become a very successful broodmare whose other foals have included Hillstar (Canadian International Stakes), Crystal Capella (Princess of Wales's Stakes) and Crystal Zvezda (Fillies' Trial Stakes). Her dam Crystal Cavern was a half-sister to the Poule d'Essai des Pouliches winner Rose Gypsy.

== Racing career ==
=== 2016: two-year-old season ===
On his first and only start as a two-year-old Crystal Ocean was ridden by Ryan Moore when he started the 7/4 favourite for a maiden race over seven furlongs at Newbury Racecourse on 17 September. After racing towards the rear of the nine-runner field he finished strongly but was beaten a neck into second place by the Richard Hannon Jr.-trained Warrior's Spirit.

=== 2017: three-year-old season ===
On 22 April Crystal Ocean began his second campaign in a maiden over ten furlongs at Nottingham Racecourse and started the 7/4 joint-favourite in a field often. Ridden by Ted Durcan he went to the front approaching the last quarter mile and pulled clear of his rivals before being eased down to win by a length from Okool. Four weeks later the colt was stepped up sharply in class for the Dante Stakes (a major trial race for the Epsom Derby) at York Racecourse in which he was partnered by Andrea Atzeni. Before the race he had attracted significant support in the ante-post betting for the Epsom Derby. In a very strong field for a Group 2 race he finished a close third behind Permian and Benbatl, with Rekindling in third. At Royal Ascot in June Crystal Ocean was made the 9/4 favourite for the King Edward VII Stakes but was beaten into third by Permian and Khalidi.

Crystal Ocean's next run was at Goodwood Racecourse when he was ridden by Moore in the Gordon Stakes, a race which often serves as a trial for the St Leger. Starting the 6/4 favourite he reversed the Ascot form as he beat Khalidi "comfortably" by three and a half lengths despite hanging right (towards the inside rail) in the closing stages. After the race Michael Stoute said "He is a horse we've always liked and Ryan has always liked him too... He is very adaptable".

The 241st running of the St Leger over fourteen and a half furlongs at Doncaster Racecourse on 16 September was described as "one of the best and most competitive Legers for years". After being restrained by his rider Jim Crowley in the early stages he stayed on strongly to finish second to Capri with Stradivarius and Rekindling in third and fourth.

In the 2017 World's Best Racehorse Rankings Crystal Ocean was rated the 90th best racehorse in the world with a rating of 118.

=== 2018: four-year-old season ===
Crystal Ocean was ridden in his first three starts of 2018 by Ryan Moore. On his seasonal debut in the Gordon Richards Stakes over ten furlongs at Sandown Park on 27 April he started favourite ahead of the Queen's horse Fabricate (winner of the Winter Hill Stakes). After recovering from a poor start he got the better of a "good battle" with Fabricate to win by a short head. Three weeks later the horse was stepped up in distance for the Aston Park Stakes over one and a half miles at Newbury and went off the 2/5 favourite against four opponents. He took the lead two furlongs out, drew away from his opponents and won "comfortably" by six lengths from Second Step.

Exactly one year after his defeat in the King Edward VII Stakes, Crystal Ocean returned to Royal Ascot and started 4/7 favourite ahead of Idaho, Barsanti (Buckhounds Stakes) and Cliffs of Moher in the Hardwicke Stakes. After racing in second place he took the lead in the straight and stayed on strongly to win by two and a half lengths from the outsider Red Verdon. Stoute commented "He's really continued to progress with his racing. He's got a lovely temperament and he's a joy to train. It was straightforward. He is so uncomplicated you can do what you like with him. He is a relaxed horse. It is so far, so good". On 28 July, over the same course and distance as his Hardwicke victory, Crystal Ocean was ridden by William Buick and started the 6/4 favourite for the 68th running of the King George VI and Queen Elizabeth Stakes. He took the lead in the straight and went two lengths clear but was worn down in the closing stages by his stablemate Poet's Word and beaten a neck with the pair finishing nine lengths in front of the other five runners. Stoute commented "They are two wonderful, brave athletes. There’s nothing between them really". When the interim World's Best Racehorse Rankings were published eight days later Crystal Ocean was rated the fourth best horse in the world behind Winx, Gun Runner and Poet's Word.

On his next appearance in the September Stakes on the synthetic polytrack surface at Kempton Park Racecourse on 8 September, Crystal Ocean was asked to concede eight pounds to the 2017 European Horse of the Year Enable. Partnered by David Probert he tracked Enable throughout the race but never looked likely to threaten the filly and was beaten three and a half lengths into second place. Buick took the ride when Crystal Ocean was made second favourite for the Champion Stakes at Ascot on 20 October. He proved no match for the winner Cracksman but kept on well to take second place in the eight-runner field.

In the 2018 World's Best Racehorse Rankings Crystal Ocean was placed eighth, with a rating of 125.

=== 2019: five-year-old season ===
As in the previous year, Crystal Ocean began his 2019 campaign in the Gordon Richards Stakes at Sandown in which he was ridden by Moore and went off the 5/6 favourite with the best fancied of his six opponents being Trais Fluors (Prix Paul de Moussac) and Knight To Behold (Prix Guillaume d'Ornano). After tracking the front-running Knight To Behold, Crystal Ocean went to the front two furlongs from the finish and drew away to win "very readily" by two and a quarter lengths. He continued to duplicate his 2018 programme by running next in the Aston Park Stakes at Newbury in May. Starting off at 2/9 he raced in second place before taking the lead in the straight and came two lengths in front of the Cumberland Lodge Stakes winner Laraaib.

On 19 June Crystal Ocean was partnered by Frankie Dettori when he ran for the third time at Royal Ascot and started the 3/1 second favourite behind Magical in the Prince of Wales's Stakes. The other six runners were Sea of Class, Waldgeist, Deirdre (Shuka Sho), Zabeel Prince (Prix d'Ispahan), Hunting Horn (Hampton Court Stakes) and Desert Encounter (Canadian International Stakes). The race was run in challenging conditions in heavy rain on soft ground. Dettori positioned Crystal Ocean in second place behind the front-running Hunting Horn before switching his mount to the wide outside to make his challenge in the straight. Crystal Ocean went to the front two furlongs from the finish and saw off the persistent challenge of Magical to win by one and a quarter lengths with a gap of more than three lengths back to Waldgeist in third. After the race Dettori said "He's an ultra-consistent horse, he's a heavyweight of the sport, never runs a bad race... I knew Crystal Ocean stayed really well, so I kicked on early and did not hear anything coming. The rest is history."

On 27 July Crystal Ocean made his second attempt to win the King George VI and Queen Elizabeth Stakes at Ascot and started the 7/2 second favourite behind Enable. After racing in mid division he made rapid progress on the outside to take the lead in the straight but was beaten a neck by Enable after a sustained struggle over the final furlong.

Crystal Ocean was strongly fancied in the ante-post betting for both the Prix de l'Arc de Triomphe and the Champion Stakes but he sustained a serious leg injury in a training gallop on 12 September and was immediately retired from racing. A spokesman for Evelyn de Rothschild explained "Crystal Ocean has had two screws inserted in a hind cannon bone and has come through the surgery successfully. It should in no way affect his future stud career".

In the 2019 World's Best Racehorse Rankings Crystal Ocean was given a rating of 128, placing him in a three-way tie for first place alongside Enable and Waldgeist.

== Pedigree ==
Pedigree of Crystal Ocean (GB), bay stallion, 2014
Sire Sea The Stars (IRE) 2006	Cape Cross (IRE); 1994	Green Desert (USA)	Danzig
Sire Sea The Stars (IRE) 2006	Cape Cross (IRE); 1994	Green Desert (USA)	Foreign Courier
Sire Sea The Stars (IRE) 2006	Cape Cross (IRE); 1994	Park Appeal	Ahonoora (GB)
Sire Sea The Stars (IRE) 2006	Cape Cross (IRE); 1994	Park Appeal	Balidaress
Sire Sea The Stars (IRE) 2006	Urban Sea (USA); 1989	Miswaki	Mr. Prospector
Sire Sea The Stars (IRE) 2006	Urban Sea (USA); 1989	Miswaki	Hopespringseternal
Sire Sea The Stars (IRE) 2006	Urban Sea (USA); 1989	Allegretta (GB)	Lombard (GER)
Sire Sea The Stars (IRE) 2006	Urban Sea (USA); 1989	Allegretta (GB)	Anatevka (GER)
Dam Crystal Star (GB) 2000	Mark of Esteem (IRE); 1993	Darshaan (GB)	Shirley Heights
Dam Crystal Star (GB) 2000	Mark of Esteem (IRE); 1993	Darshaan (GB)	Delsy (FR)
Dam Crystal Star (GB) 2000	Mark of Esteem (IRE); 1993	Homage (GB)	Ajdal (USA)
Dam Crystal Star (GB) 2000	Mark of Esteem (IRE); 1993	Homage (GB)	Home Love (USA)
Dam Crystal Star (GB) 2000	Crystal Cavern (USA); 1992	Be My Guest	Northern Dancer (CAN)
Dam Crystal Star (GB) 2000	Crystal Cavern (USA); 1992	Be My Guest	What A Treat
Dam Crystal Star (GB) 2000	Crystal Cavern (USA); 1992	Krisalya (GB)	Kris
Dam Crystal Star (GB) 2000	Crystal Cavern (USA); 1992	Krisalya (GB)	Sassalya (Family 7-a)
