= Cracksman (horse) =

British-bred Thoroughbred racehorse and sire

- Racing silks of Anthony Oppenheimer
- Sire: Frankel
- Grandsire: Galileo
- Dam: Rhadegunda
- Damsire: Pivotal
- Sex: Colt
- Foaled: 9 April 2014
- Country: United Kingdom
- Colour: Bay
- Breeder: Hascombe and Valiant Studs
- Owner: Anthony Oppenheimer
- Trainer: John Gosden
- Record: 11: 8-2-1
- Earnings: £2,793,064

Major wins
- Investec Derby Trial (2017); Great Voltigeur Stakes (2017); Prix Niel (2017); Champion Stakes (2017, 2018); Prix Ganay (2018); Coronation Cup (2018)

Awards
- Cartier Champion Three-year-old Colt (2017); World's top-rated 3-y-o (2017); World's top-rated racehorse (2018)

Honours
- Timeform rating: 136
- Last updated on 26 June 2022

Cracksman (foaled 9 April 2014) is a British Thoroughbred racehorse and sire. He won his only race as a two-year-old in 2016 before developing into a top-class middle distance performer in the following year. As a three-year-old Cracksman won the Investec Derby Trial before running third when favourite for the 2017 Epsom Derby. The horse then finished runner-up in the Irish Derby. He went on to win the Great Voltigeur Stakes and Prix Niel, before recording an emphatic success in the Champion Stakes. He ended the year as the top-rated three-year-old in the world. In 2018, he won the Prix Ganay and the Coronation Cup before taking a second Champion Stakes.

A son of Frankel, Cracksman is the sire of Ace Impact who won the French Derby and Prix de l'Arc de Triomphe in 2023.

== Background ==
Cracksman is a bay horse bred in England by his owner Anthony Oppenheimer's Hascombe and Valiant Studs. He was sent into training with John Gosden at Newmarket, Suffolk.

Cracksman is from the first crop of foals sired by Frankel. His dam Rhadegunda showed good form on the track winning three races including the Listed Prix Solitude, and has had some success as a broodmare, producing the Solario Stakes winner Fantastic Moon. She was a granddaughter of the Oppenheimer family's 1000 Guineas winner On the House. Other descendants of On the House's grand-dam Courtessa have included Golden Horn, Rebecca Sharp, Habibti and the Australian champions Danewin and Octagonal.

== Racing career ==
=== 2016: two-year-old season ===
On his racecourse debut, Cracksman started at odds of 9/2 in a ten-runner maiden race over one mile at Newmarket Racecourse on 19 October. Ridden by Robert Havlin he raced towards the rear of the ten-runner field before taking the lead inside the final furlong and winning by one and a quarter lengths from the Godolphin runner Wild Tempest.

=== 2017: three-year-old season ===
==== Spring ====
Cracksman began his second season in the Investec Derby Trial over ten furlongs at Epsom Racecourse on 26 April, a race in which he was ridden for the first time by Frankie Dettori. Starting the 4/6 favourite against seven opponents he started poorly and then pulled hard before being settled by Dettori in third place. After struggling to obtain a clear run early in the straight and then finished strongly to catch the Mark Johnston-trained Permian on the line and win by a short head. The form of the race was subsequently boosted when Permian won the Dante Stakes at York Racecourse in May.

==== Summer ====
Despite never having previously contested, let alone won a group race, Cracksman was regarded as a leading contender for the Epsom Derby over one and a half miles at Epsom on 3 June and was made the 7/2 favourite against eighteen opponents. Ridden by Dettori he tracked the leaders, turned into the straight in fifth and took the lead approaching the final furlong. He kept on well but was overtaken in the closing stages and finished third, beaten three quarters of a length and a neck by Wings of Eagles and Cliffs of Moher. On 1 July at the Curragh he faced Wings of Eagles again in the Irish Derby, a race which also attracted the leading French colt Waldgeist. After being restrained in the early stages he made good progress in the straight but failed by a neck to overhaul the front-running Capri with the Derby winner a short head away in third.

At York on 23 August Cracksman was made 4/6 favourite for the Group 2 Great Voltigeur Stakes. This race is traditionally regarded as a trial race for the St Leger, but Cracksman had never been entered for the Doncaster classic. With Dettori in the saddle he went to the front early in the straight and steadily increased his advantage to come home six lengths clear of the Chester Vase winner Venice Beach. After the race the Prix de l'Arc de Triomphe and the Champion Stakes were mentioned as future targets, but Gosden emphasised that the colt was still maturing and that "his main programme is next year".

==== Autumn ====
On 10 September Cracksman was sent to France for the Prix Niel (a recognised trial race for the Arc de Triomphe) over 2400 metres in which he faced four opponents including Finche (Prix Eugène Adam) and Ice Breeze (Prix Hocquart). Starting the odds-on favourite he took the lead in the straight and drew away to win "comfortably" by three and a half lengths from Avilius. Oppenheimer opted not to run his colt in the Arc citing the unsuitability of the Chantilly track and his desire to save Cracksman for a four-year-old campaign.

On 21 October Cracksman was brought back in distance and was matched against older horses for the first time in the Champion Stakes over ten furlongs at Ascot Racecourse. With Dettori again in the saddle he was made the 13/8 favourite in a ten-runner field which included Highland Reel, Cliffs of Moher, Barney Roy, Brametot, Poet's Word and Recoletos (Prix Greffulhe). After racing in fourth place until the final turn, Cracksman went to the front early in the straight and drew away from his opponents to win in "impressive" style by seven lengths from Poet's Word. Gosden commented "He's improved through the year. He's like a fighter weighing more now, if he started as a middleweight, he's now a light-heavyweight. He got in a dreadful muddle coming down to Tattenham Corner in the Derby, but he's learning to race. He's handled a mile-and-a-quarter well today, he's versatile now". Dettori said "That was amazing. It's my first Champion Stakes and he put a good field to bed in the manner of a champion. It's a fantastic feeling. I glanced at the big screen and he was clear. I've not got words to describe it, brilliant. He's been given time to develop and that's what you've got now. He's been working so sweetly and has got the success he deserved."

=== 2018: four-year-old season ===
Cracksman began his third campaign in the Prix Ganay at the newly re-opened Longchamp Racecourse on 29 April as 3/5 favourite against six opponents, including Cloth of Stars and Rhododendron. After racing in second place for most of the way he was sent to the front by Dettori 200 metres from the finish and drew away to win "readily" by four lengths from Wren's Day. After the race Gosden said Dettori was pleased with Cracksman: "...he got very low and stretched, which is a great thing to see in a horse. The great thing is he's won today on good, and perhaps slightly on the faster side of good, so he's versatile. Mentally I was impressed with just how relaxed and professional he is."

On 1 June at Epsom, Cracksman started the 2/7 favourite for the Coronation Cup, with the best-fancied of his five opponents being Hawkbill and Idaho. Cracksman raced towards the rear until the straight and had to be driven hard by Dettori to get the better of the front-running outsider Salouen by a head. Gosden initially accounted for the performance by saying that Cracksman had failed to cope with the downhill section of the course. Later he explained that the colt had lunged forward in the starting stalls, struck his head hard against the framework and "must have run the race in a complete daze". At Royal Ascot nineteen days later, the colt started 2/5 favourite against five opponents for the Prince of Wales's Stakes over ten furlongs. He was never going well and although he took the lead in the straight he was soon overtaken and beaten two and a quarter lengths into second by Poet's Word. Gosden later suggested that the horse was distracted by the fillies returning to the paddock from the previous race. The trainer added that "he wasn't quite mentally with us; he got very interested in the girls and obviously caught a little whiff of them and was rather keener to get over the hedge and say hello to them".

After an absence of four months, Cracksman attempted to repeat his 2017 success in the Champion Stakes on 20 October, a race in which he was equipped with blinkers for the first time. His seven opponents were Crystal Ocean, Capri, Monarchs Glen (Darley Stakes), Rhododendron, Verbal Dexterity (National Stakes), Maverick Wave and the Czech-trained Subway Dancer. After being settled in fourth place, he took the lead approaching the last quarter mile and drew right away to win by six lengths from Crystal Ocean, with Dettori waving his whip to the crowd in celebration. Gosden commented: "I'm a great believer in putting a semi-blinker on as I've had a lot of luck with it down the years and it's a little trick I learned in America. He is a hugely talented horse and he showed it again today and I'm sure he will be off to stud now". Dettori said: "All the lights were on and when I kicked he went 'whoosh'. It was brilliant. He did it all on his own. The blinkers worked and he was concentrating. You know when you are going twice as fast as the others, and I could celebrate".

== Stud career ==
After retiring from racing, Cracksman was placed on the stallion roster at Darley Stud. His initial service fee was listed at £20,000.

=== Notable progeny ===
c = colt, f = filly, g = gelding

Foaled	Name	Sex	Major Wins
2020	Ace Impact	c	Prix du Jockey Club, Prix de l'Arc de Triomphe

== Assessment and awards ==
On 16 November 2017 at the Cartier Racing Awards, Cracksman was named Champion Three-year-old colt.

In the 2017 World's Best Racehorse Rankings, Cracksman was rated at 130 to be the third-best horse in the world, the best horse in Europe and the best three-year-old.

In the 2018 World's Best Racehorse Rankings, Cracksman shared the title of the best horse in the world with Australia's Winx, with the rating 130.

== Pedigree ==
Pedigree of Cracksman (GB), bay colt, 2014
Sire Frankel (GB) 2008	Galileo (IRE); 1998	Sadler's Wells	Northern Dancer
Sire Frankel (GB) 2008	Galileo (IRE); 1998	Sadler's Wells	Fairy Bridge
Sire Frankel (GB) 2008	Galileo (IRE); 1998	Urban Sea	Miswaki
Sire Frankel (GB) 2008	Galileo (IRE); 1998	Urban Sea	Allegretta
Sire Frankel (GB) 2008	Kind (IRE); 2001	Danehill	Danzig
Sire Frankel (GB) 2008	Kind (IRE); 2001	Danehill	Razyana
Sire Frankel (GB) 2008	Kind (IRE); 2001	Rainbow Lake	Rainbow Quest
Sire Frankel (GB) 2008	Kind (IRE); 2001	Rainbow Lake	Rockfest
Dam Rhadegunda (GB) 2005	Pivotal (GB); 1993	Polar Falcon	Nureyev
Dam Rhadegunda (GB) 2005	Pivotal (GB); 1993	Polar Falcon	Marie d'Argonne
Dam Rhadegunda (GB) 2005	Pivotal (GB); 1993	Fearless Revival	Cozzene
Dam Rhadegunda (GB) 2005	Pivotal (GB); 1993	Fearless Revival	Stufida
Dam Rhadegunda (GB) 2005	St Radegund (GB); 1994	Green Desert	Danzig
Dam Rhadegunda (GB) 2005	St Radegund (GB); 1994	Green Desert	Foreign Courier
Dam Rhadegunda (GB) 2005	St Radegund (GB); 1994	On the House	Be My Guest
Dam Rhadegunda (GB) 2005	St Radegund (GB); 1994	On the House	Lora (Family: 9-c)

- Cracksman is inbred 4 × 4 to Danzig, meaning that this stallion appears twice in the fourth generation of his pedigree. He is also linebred 4*5*5*5*5 to Northern Dancer, who appears once in the fourth generation and four times in the fifth generation of his pedigree, as the sire of Sadler’s Wells, Danzig, Nureyev, and Be My Guest. He also is inbred 5*5 to the broodmare Special, who appears twice in the fifth generation of his pedigree, as the dam of both Fairy Bridge and Nureyev.
