= Padraig Beggy =

Irish professional jockey

Personal information
- Born: 30 March 1986 (age 40)
- Occupation: Jockey

Horse racing career
- Sport: Horse racing

Major racing wins
- British Classic Race wins: Epsom Derby (2017)

Significant horses
- Wings of Eagles, Sovereign

Padraig Beggy (born 30 March 1986) is an Irish professional jockey, who won the 2017 Epsom Derby on Wings of Eagles and the 2019 Irish Derby on Sovereign. He is retained by leading trainer Aidan O'Brien.

== Early career ==
Beggy grew up in Dunboyne, Ireland, and his interest in horse racing developed on childhood visits to Fairyhouse. He first sat on a horse at the age of 14 when working for a local trainer, Owen Weldon. He began his professional racing career in 2003 after graduating from the Racing Academy and Centre of Education in Kildare, and rode his first winner in an apprentice handicap at Naas in July of that year on Red Venus, trained by Seamus Fahey. He was briefly apprentice with Kevin Prendergast which caused him to downscale his riding ambitions, since without the backing of a major trainer, the life of a jockey was tough. In total, he spent eight seasons riding in Ireland, and in his most successful year there, he achieved 22 winners. Notable victories came in big handicaps on Prendergast's Ulfah, Noel Meade's Sugarhoneybaby and Green Lassy for Ger Lyons.

Beggy moved to England in 2011, and was based with trainer John Quinn one year, and David Evans the following year. He won another eight races before moving on to further his career in Australia.

In 2014, while in Australia, Beggy was banned from riding for fifteen months after testing positive for cocaine. To compound the issue, he provided two false explanations for the results. First he claimed that the positive test was as a consequence of anaesthetic used by his dentist. Then he claimed that it was due to eating coca leaves provided by a friend. Eventually, he confessed that he had deliberately taken the drug while at a barbecue three nights previously. The lack of honesty caused additional trouble and he was banned for fifteen months. After an appeal failed, he returned to Dunboyne. At that point, although a decade into his career, he had not succeeded in making a major impact, and there seemed to be limited prospects of a successful return to the sport.

== Ballydoyle career ==
However, two friends, who worked at Aidan O’Brien's stable at Ballydoyle, introduced him to the trainer, and O'Brien gave him a job riding out. O'Brien encouraged him to work hard, promising he would be repaid for his efforts, and began to give him rides in big races as a result. Nevertheless, several other jockeys were ahead of him in the stable's pecking order and until the 2017 Derby, he had only ridden three winners in two and a half years with O'Brien. In 2015, he rode one winner from 26 races, and in 2016 one from 66 rides. Mainly he was regarded as a "journeyman jockey", although in April 2017, he secured his biggest winner to that point by winning a Group 3 at Leopardstown on Hydrangea.

In the 2017 Derby, O'Brien ran six horses. Beggy was given the ride on Wings of Eagles, which was the fifth string according to the betting. It was only his second ride in Britain in five years. Despite the long odds (40/1), the horse won, to the shock of even O’Brien himself. The trainer said Beggy had given the horse "a peach of a ride" and called him "a world-class rider".

Shortly after that success, Beggy was given an eight-day ban for interference when riding O'Brien's pacemaker Taj Mahal in the Eclipse at Sandown.

In the 2019 Epsom Derby, Beggy rode the Ballydoyle pacemaker Sovereign, who, having made the running until the straight, finished in tenth place. In the Irish Derby Sovereign, again ridden by Beggy, started at odds of 33/1. He soon went to the front, building up a strong lead with only stablemate Norway for company. He maintained his lead going into the straight and stayed on strongly under hands and heels in the final furlong to win by six lengths from Epsom Derby winner Anthony Van Dyck. It was Beggy's first win of the season. Afterwards, he said: "I'm just very, very lucky I've won the English and Irish Derby. That is down to a big group of people but I would say mainly Aidan O’Brien to put me on. Aidan would give you confidence and that helps. I just got into a lovely comfortable rhythm and I felt like I could go quicker all through the race. My horse really enjoyed here, a big galloping track... I did think that something would be coming to me, and when I was close enough to have a peep at the big screen I knew I was clear".

Beggy continues to ride for O'Brien.

== Major wins ==
(United Kingdom) Great Britain

- Epsom Derby - (1) - Wings of Eagles (2017)

(Republic of Ireland) Ireland

- Irish Derby - (1) - Sovereign (2019)

== Statistics ==
=== Ireland ===
- 2003 - 4 winners / 57 races
- 2004 - 21 / 271
- 2005 - 14 / 212
- 2006 - 6 / 245
- 2007 - 8 / 260
- 2008 - 17 / 261
- 2009 - 15 / 199
- 2010 - 22 / 264
- 2011 - 7 / 108
- 2012 - no rides
- 2013 - no rides
- 2014 - no rides
- 2015 - 0 / 3
- 2016 - 0 / 37
- 2017 - 4 / 48
- 2018 - 2 / 22
- 2019 - 1 / 51
