= Pat Cosgrave =

Irish jockey

Patrick Cosgrave (born 2 June 1982 in Banbridge) is a Northern Irish flat racing jockey based in England. He won his first race in 1999 and went on to become Irish champion apprentice in 2003, having spent two years in the stable of Aidan O'Brien before moving to Britain in 2004.

== Major wins ==
(United Kingdom) Great Britain

- Nunthorpe Stakes - (1) - Borderlescott (2008)
- Sprint Cup - (1) - Markab (2010)
- Golden Jubilee Stakes - (1) - Society Rock (2011)

Germany

- Grosser Preis von Berlin - (1) - Best Solution (2018)
- Grosser Preis von Baden - (1) - Best Solution (2018)

Australia

- Caulfield Stakes - (1) - Benbatl (2018)
- Caulfield Cup - (1) - Best Solution (2018)
