= Anthony Van Dyck (horse) =

Irish-bred Thoroughbred racehorse

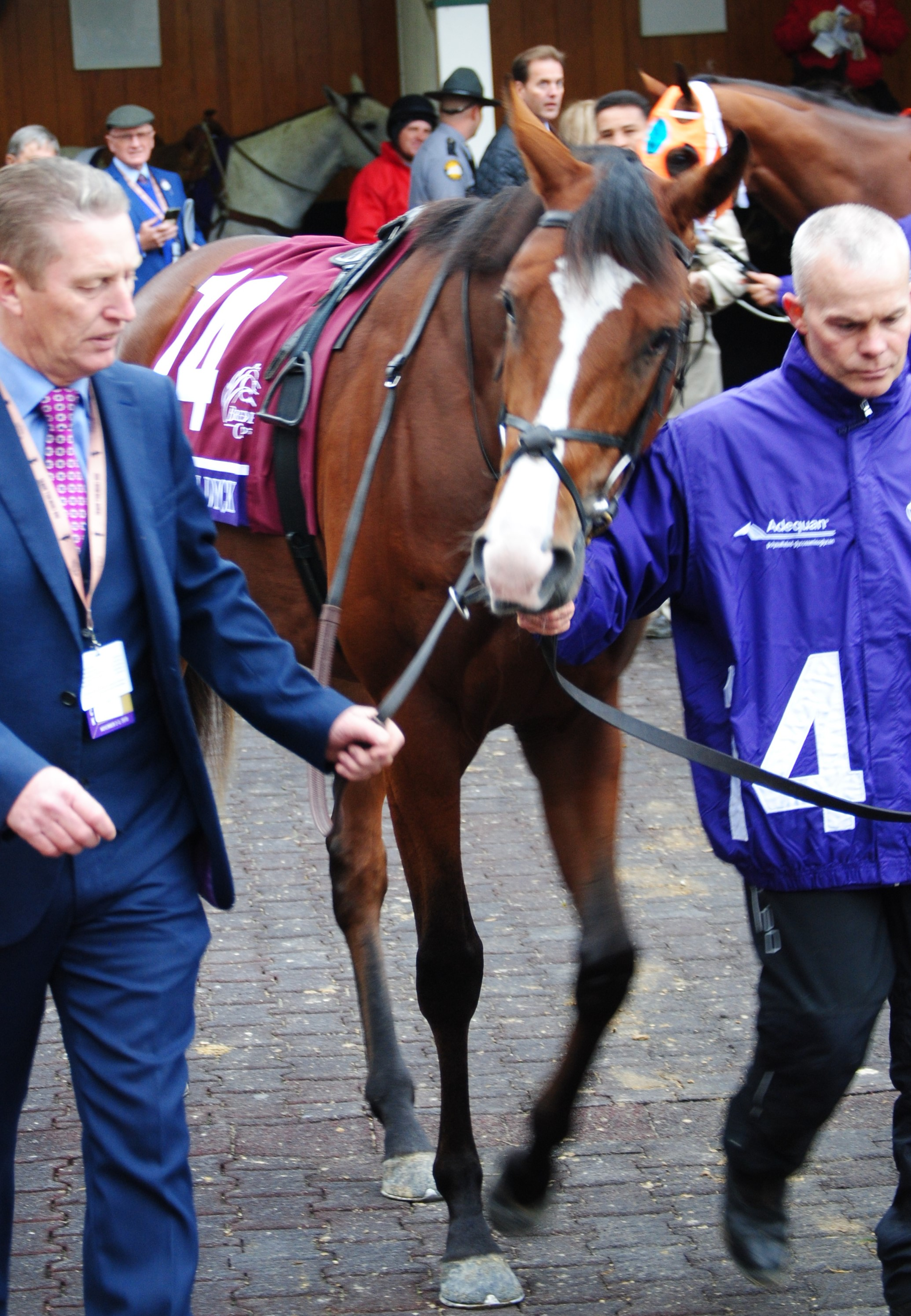
- Anthony Van Dyck at the 2018 Breeders' Cup
- Sire: Galileo
- Grandsire: Sadler's Wells
- Dam: Believe'N'Succeed
- Damsire: Exceed And Excel
- Sex: Colt
- Foaled: 19 May 2016
- Died: 3 November 2020 (aged 4)
- Country: Ireland
- Colour: Bay
- Breeder: Orpendale, Chelston & Wynatt
- Owner: Susan Magnier, Michael Tabor & Derrick Smith
- Trainer: Aidan O'Brien
- Record: 19: 6-4-3
- Earnings: £2,360,481

Major wins
- Tyros Stakes (2018); Futurity Stakes (2018); Derby Trial Stakes (2019); Epsom Derby (2019); Prix Foy (2020)

Anthony Van Dyck (19 May 2016 – 3 November 2020) was an Irish Thoroughbred racehorse, best known for winning the 2019 Epsom Derby. He was a top-class two-year-old in 2018 when he won three of his seven races including the Tyros Stakes and the Futurity Stakes as well as finishing second in the National Stakes and third in the Dewhurst Stakes. He won the Derby Trial Stakes on his three-year-old debut before taking the Epsom Derby on 1 June. Later that year he was placed in the Irish Derby, Irish Champion Stakes and Breeders' Cup Turf. He remained in training as a four-year-old in 2020, winning the Prix Foy and running second in both the Coronation Cup and the Caulfield Cup. He was euthanized after breaking down in the 2020 Melbourne Cup on 3 November 2020.

== Background ==
Anthony Van Dyck was a bay colt with a white blaze bred in Ireland by Orpendale, Chelston & Wynatt, a breeding company associated with the Coolmore Stud. He was sent into training with Aidan O'Brien at Ballydoyle. Like many Coolmore horses, the official details of his ownership have changed from race to race but he was usually described as being owned by a partnership of Michael Tabor, Derrick Smith, and Susan Magnier. He was a very late foal in having been born on 19 May.

He was sired by Galileo, who won the Derby, Irish Derby, and King George VI and Queen Elizabeth Stakes in 2001. Galileo became one of the world's leading stallions, earning his tenth champion sire of Great Britain and Ireland title in 2018. His other progeny included Cape Blanco, Frankel, Golden Lilac, Nathaniel, New Approach, Rip Van Winkle, Found Minding, and Ruler of the World. Anthony Van Dyck's dam Believe'N'Succeed was a successful racemare in Australia, winning the Blue Diamond Prelude Fillies in 2008, and went on to produce the Railway Stakes winner Bounding before being exported to Ireland. She was a granddaughter of the Alabama Stakes winner November Snow and a female-line descendant of the American broodmare Blue Denim.

== Racing career ==
=== 2018: two-year-old season ===
Anthony Van Dyck began his racing career by finishing seventh behind Klute in a maiden race over seven furlongs at the Curragh on 1 July. Two weeks later the colt was made the 10/11 favourite for a similar event over one mile at Killarney Racecourse in which he was ridden, as on his debut, by his trainer's son, Donnacha O'Brien. He recorded his first success as he took the lead two furlongs out and went clear of his eight rivals to win "easily" by eight lengths. Eleven days after his maiden win Anthony Van Dyck was stepped up in class and started 8/11 favourite for the Group 3 Tyros Stakes at Leopardstown Racecourse. Partnered by Ryan Moore he raced in second place before taking the lead approaching the final furlong and recorded another easy win, coming home four and three quarter lengths clear of the Jim Bolger-trained Bold Approach. After the race Aidan O'Brien said "We always thought he would get a mile well, as he did in Killarney, but when you see him doing that over seven, you know he's a smart colt".

Ryan Moore was again in the saddle when Anthony Van Dyck moved up to Group 2 class for the Futurity Stakes over seven furlongs at the Curragh on 26 August and started 4/6 favourite against five opponents. After tracking the leaders he went to the front inside the furlong and kept on well to win by half a length from his stablemate Christmas. O'Brien commented "I'm delighted... We always viewed him as a horse that would get middle distances next season. He had a tough enough race as they went all the way". In September the colt contested the Group 1 National Stakes at the Curragh and finished second of the seven runners, beaten one and a quarter lengths by the Godolphin colt Quorto. He was then sent to England for the Dewhurst Stakes at Newmarket Racecourse. He took the lead approaching the last quarter mile but was outpaced in the closing stages and came home third behind Too Darn Hot and Advertise. For his final run of the season, the colt was sent to the United States to contest the Breeders' Cup Juvenile Turf at Churchill Downs and was made the 3/1 joint favourite, but never looked likely to win and came home ninth behind Line of Duty.

=== 2019: three-year-old season ===
On 11 May 2019 Anthony Van Dyck made his seasonal debut in the Derby Trial Stakes over one and a half miles at Lingfield Park and started the 2/1 favourite against nine British-trained opponents. Ridden by Moore he settled in mid-division before taking the lead a furlong out and won by two and a quarter lengths from Pablo Escobarr. After the race the Ballydoyle representative Paul Smith said "[we are] delighted with him. There were a few fit ones in there that had run recently and we hadn’t run since last year. No doubt he’ll come on nicely for the run".

The 240th running of the Derby took place over one and a half miles at Epsom Racecourse on 1 June 2019. Ridden by Seamie Heffernan, Anthony Van Dyck was made the 13/2 fourth choice in the betting behind Sir Dragonet (Chester Vase), Broome (Derrinstown Stud Derby Trial), and Telecaster (Dante Stakes) in a thirteen-runner field. After turning into the straight in ninth place he briefly struggled to obtain a clear run before being switched to the left to produce a strong run up the inside. He gained the advantage 100 yards from the finish and prevailed by half a length from Madhmoon, Japan, Broome, and Sir Dragonet in a blanket finish. The 46 year old Heffernan who was winning the race at his twelfth attempt said "It was only a matter of time... When you’re riding for Aidan, you probably have more of a chance than riding for anyone else, that's the bottom line".

On 29 June, Anthony Van Dyck was ridden by Moore when he started the 5/4 favourite for the Irish Derby at the Curragh in a field which included Madhmoon and Broome. He raced in fourth place before making steady progress in the straight but never looked likely to reel in the pacemaker Sovereign and was beaten by six lengths into second place. Four weeks later at Ascot Racecourse the colt was matched against older horses and started the 7/1 third choice in the betting for the King George VI and Queen Elizabeth Stakes. He tracked the leaders before fading badly in the last quarter mile and came home tenth of the eleven runners, almost forty lengths behind the winner Enable. At Leopardstown Racecourse in September Anthony Van Dyck was dropped back in distance for the ten furlong Irish Champion Stakes and produced a much better effort as he stayed on well to take third place behind the four-year-old fillies Magical and Magic Wand.

For his penultimate run of the year, Anthony Van Dyck was sent to California to contest the Breeders' Cup Turf at Santa Anita Park on 2 November. Starting the 3/1 second choice in the betting he made progress on the inside on the final turn but was hampered in the straight before coming home third behind Bricks and Mortar and United. At Sha Tin Racecourse on 8 December the colt ended his campaign in the Hong Kong Vase in which he faded badly in the closing stages and finished unplaced behind the Japanese four-year-old Glory Vase.

=== 2020: four-year-old season ===
The flat racing season in Britain and Ireland was restructured as a result of the COVID-19 outbreak and the Coronation Cup was run behind closed doors at Newmarket on 5 June. With Moore in the saddle Anthony Van Dyck started at odds of 11/2 and stayed on well after looking outpaced three furlongs out to take second place behind Ghaiyyath with Stradivarius in third. Two weeks later the colt started favourite for the Hardwicke Stakes at Royal Ascot but never looked likely to win and came home fifth of the nine runners behind the filly Fanny Logan, beaten five lengths by the winner. After a break of almost three months Anthony Van Dyck returned in the Prix Foy over 2400 metres at Longchamp Racecourse and went off the 3.8/1 second favourite behind Stradivarius in a six-runner field which also included the Grand Prix de Saint-Cloud winner Way To Paris. Ridden by Mickael Barzalona he took the lead soon after the start and repelled a sustained challenge from the favourite to win by a short neck.

After his win in France Anthony Van Dyck was sent to race in Australia. On 17 October he was ridden by Hugh Bowman when he contested the Caulfield Cup over 2400 metres at Caulfield Racecourse. After racing towards the rear of the field he produced a strong late charge in the straight, but failed by a head to overhaul the mare Verry Elleegant to whom he was conceding eight pounds in weight. On 3 November the colt carried top weight of 58.5 kg in the 2020 Melbourne Cup and went off at odds of 9/1. After tracking the leaders he stumbled 400 metres from the finish and was pulled up by Bowman. He was found to have sustained a fracture to his fetlock and was euthanised. Aidan O'Brien commented: "He was a very kind, sound, lovely-natured horse – incredibly tough and genuine. It was very sad to see that happen, it was just very unfortunate. He was a good Derby winner who we'll have fond memories of."

In the 2020 World's Best Racehorse Rankings, Anthony Van Dyck was rated on 122, making him the equal twenty-first best racehorse in the world.

== Pedigree ==
Pedigree of Anthony Van Dyck (IRE), bay colt, 2016
Sire Galileo (IRE) 1998	Sadler's Wells (USA); 1981	Northern Dancer	Nearctic
Sire Galileo (IRE) 1998	Sadler's Wells (USA); 1981	Northern Dancer	Natalma
Sire Galileo (IRE) 1998	Sadler's Wells (USA); 1981	Fairy Bridge	Bold Reason
Sire Galileo (IRE) 1998	Sadler's Wells (USA); 1981	Fairy Bridge	Special
Sire Galileo (IRE) 1998	Urban Sea (USA) ch. 1989	Miswaki	Mr. Prospector
Sire Galileo (IRE) 1998	Urban Sea (USA) ch. 1989	Miswaki	Hopespringseternal
Sire Galileo (IRE) 1998	Urban Sea (USA) ch. 1989	Allegretta	Lombard
Sire Galileo (IRE) 1998	Urban Sea (USA) ch. 1989	Allegretta	Anatevka
Dam Believe'N'Succeed (AUS) 2005	Exceed And Excel (AUS); 2000	Danehill	Danzig
Dam Believe'N'Succeed (AUS) 2005	Exceed And Excel (AUS); 2000	Danehill	Razyana
Dam Believe'N'Succeed (AUS) 2005	Exceed And Excel (AUS); 2000	Patrona	Lomond
Dam Believe'N'Succeed (AUS) 2005	Exceed And Excel (AUS); 2000	Patrona	Gladiolus
Dam Believe'N'Succeed (AUS) 2005	Arctic Drift (USA); 2000	Gone West	Mr. Prospector
Dam Believe'N'Succeed (AUS) 2005	Arctic Drift (USA); 2000	Gone West	Secrettame
Dam Believe'N'Succeed (AUS) 2005	Arctic Drift (USA); 2000	November Snow	Storm Cat
Dam Believe'N'Succeed (AUS) 2005	Arctic Drift (USA); 2000	November Snow	Princess Alydar (Family 16-c)

- Anthony Van Dyck is inbred 4 × 4 to Mr. Prospector, meaning that this stallion appears twice in the fourth generation of his pedigree.
