= Cliffs of Moher (horse) =

21st-century racehorse trained in Ireland

- Racing silks of Sue Magnier
- Sire: Galileo
- Grandsire: Sadler's Wells
- Dam: Wave
- Damsire: Dansili
- Sex: Colt
- Foaled: 12 March 2014
- Died: 6 November 2018 (aged 4)
- Country: Ireland
- Colour: Bay
- Breeder: Wave Syndicate
- Owner: M. Jooste, Michael Tabor, Derrick Smith & Susan Magnier, Lloyd Williams
- Trainer: Aidan O'Brien
- Record: 16: 3-2-2
- Earnings: £818,032

Major wins
- Dee Stakes (2017); Mooresbridge Stakes (2018)

Cliffs of Moher (12 March 2014 – 6 November 2018), called The Cliffsofmoher when racing in Australia, was an Irish Thoroughbred racehorse. As a three-year-old he won the Dee Stakes and finished second in the 2017 Epsom Derby. Cliffs of Moher was euthanised after breaking his shoulder in the running of the 2018 Melbourne Cup at Flemington Racecourse on 6 November 2018.

== Background ==
Cliffs of Moher was a bay colt bred in Ireland by the Wave Syndicate, a breeding company associated with the Coolmore Stud organisation. The colt was sent into training with Aidan O'Brien at Ballydoyle. Like many Coolmore horses, the official details of his ownership changed from race to race: He had sometimes been listed as being the property of Susan Magnier, while on other occasions he was described as being owned by a partnership of M. Jooste, Derrick Smith, Michael Tabor and Susan Magnier.

He was sired by Galileo, who won the Derby, Irish Derby and King George VI and Queen Elizabeth Stakes in 2001. Galileo is now one of the world's leading stallions and has been champion sire of Great Britain and Ireland eight times so far. His other progeny include Cape Blanco, Frankel, Golden Lilac, Nathaniel, New Approach, Rip Van Winkle, Found, Minding and Ruler of the World. Cliffs of Moher was the first foal produced by his dam Wave who showed modest racing ability, winning one minor race from four starts. Wave's dam, Queen Cleopatra, finished third in both the Irish 1,000 Guineas and the Prix de Diane and was a full-sister to Henrythenavigator.

== Racing career ==
=== 2016: two-year-old season ===
Cliffs of Moher made his racecourse debut in a seven furlong maiden race at Cork Racecourse on 15 October in which he was ridden by his trainer's son Donnacha O'Brien. Starting at odds of 4/1 in a fourteen-runner field he kept on well in the closing stages without ever looking likely to win and came home fifth, more than nine lengths behind the winner Spanish Tenor. Two weeks later in a similar event at Leopardstown Racecourse the colt was ridden by Seamie Heffernan and started 7/2 third choice in the betting behind his stablemate Orderofthegarter. Despite sweating up before the race he went to the front soon after the start and was never headed thereafter, winning "easily" by 5 1/2 lengths from Orderofthegarter.

=== 2017: three-year-old season ===
On his first appearance as a three-year-old, Cliffs of Moher was sent to England to contest the Dee Stakes (a trial race for The Derby) over 10 1/2 furlongs at Chester Racecourse on 12 May. He was ridden by Ryan Moore and started the 4/5 favourite against seven opponents headed by the Michael Stoute-trained Mirage Dancer. He was amongst the leaders from the start, took the lead a furlong out and won by 1 1/2 lengths from the Godolphin representative Bay of Poets.

On 3 June Cliffs of Moher was one of six Ballydoyle runners in an eighteen-runner field for the 238th running of the Epsom Derby and started the 5/1 second favourite after being selected by the stable's top jockey Ryan Moore. After being restrained towards the rear of the field, he made rapid progress on the outside in the straight. He overtook the favourite Cracksman inside the last furlong, but was caught in the final strides by the outsider Wings of Eagles and beaten three-quarters of a length into second place. The colt was then dropped in distance and matched against older horses in the Eclipse Stakes over ten furlongs at Sandown Park on 8 July. He was made the 7/4 favourite, but lost his chance after being badly hampered and finished fourth behind Ulysses who won by a nose from Barney Roy. At York Racecourse in August the colt started at odds of 9/2 in the International Stakes. In a change of tactics he led from the start but was overtaken in the straight and finished fourth behind Ulysses, Churchill and Barney Roy.

=== 2018: four-year-old season ===
Cliffs of Moher was renamed The Cliffsofmoher when sent to race in Australia in October 2018, to avoid confusion with another horse already running in Australia. The Cliffsofmoher broke down during the 2018 Melbourne Cup, reportedly breaking his right shoulder, and was subsequently put down.

== Pedigree ==
Pedigree of Cliffs of Moher (IRE), bay colt, 2014
Sire Galileo (IRE) 1998	Sadler's Wells (USA); 1981	Northern Dancer	Nearctic
Sire Galileo (IRE) 1998	Sadler's Wells (USA); 1981	Northern Dancer	Natalma
Sire Galileo (IRE) 1998	Sadler's Wells (USA); 1981	Fairy Bridge	Bold Reason
Sire Galileo (IRE) 1998	Sadler's Wells (USA); 1981	Fairy Bridge	Special
Sire Galileo (IRE) 1998	Urban Sea (USA) ch. 1989	Miswaki	Mr. Prospector
Sire Galileo (IRE) 1998	Urban Sea (USA) ch. 1989	Miswaki	Hopespringseternal
Sire Galileo (IRE) 1998	Urban Sea (USA) ch. 1989	Allegretta	Lombard
Sire Galileo (IRE) 1998	Urban Sea (USA) ch. 1989	Allegretta	Anatevka
Dam Wave (IRE) 2009	Dansili (GB); 1996	Danehill	Danzig
Dam Wave (IRE) 2009	Dansili (GB); 1996	Danehill	Razyana
Dam Wave (IRE) 2009	Dansili (GB); 1996	Hasili	Kahyasi
Dam Wave (IRE) 2009	Dansili (GB); 1996	Hasili	Kerali
Dam Wave (IRE) 2009	Queen Cleopatra (IRE); 2003	Kingmambo	Mr. Prospector
Dam Wave (IRE) 2009	Queen Cleopatra (IRE); 2003	Kingmambo	Miesque
Dam Wave (IRE) 2009	Queen Cleopatra (IRE); 2003	Sequoyah	Sadler's Wells
Dam Wave (IRE) 2009	Queen Cleopatra (IRE); 2003	Sequoyah	Brigid (Family 9-b)
