= Wings of Eagles (horse) =

French-bred Thoroughbred racehorse

- Racing silks of Derrick Smith
- Sire: Pour Moi
- Grandsire: Montjeu
- Dam: Ysoldina
- Damsire: Kendor
- Sex: Colt
- Foaled: 17 March 2014
- Country: France
- Colour: Bay
- Breeder: Mme Aliette Forien & Mr Gilles Forien
- Owner: Michael Tabor, Derrick Smith & Sue Magnier
- Trainer: Aidan O'Brien
- Record: 7: 2-1-1
- Earnings: £1,075,441

Major wins
- Epsom Derby (2017)

Wings of Eagles (foaled 17 March 2014) is a French-bred, Irish-trained Thoroughbred racehorse. He is best known for his victory in the 2017 Epsom Derby at odds of 40–1, having never previously won a stakes race. He sustained a career-ending injury when finishing third in the Irish Derby on his only subsequent appearance.

== Background ==
Wings of Eagles is a dark-coated bay colt with a large white star bred in France by Aliette and Gilles Forien. He is from the second crop of the Irish-bred stallion Pour Moi, who won the 2011 Epsom Derby as well as the Group 2 Prix Greffulhe the same year. Pour Moi entered stud at Coolmore Stud in Ireland in 2012 and shuttled intermittently to Windsor Park Stud in New Zealand. For the 2017 breeding season, he was moved to Grange Stud as a Coolmore National Hunt stallion. Pour Moi's other notable runners include Australian Group 1 winner Sacred Elixir and Irish Group 3 winner Only Mine.

Wings of Eagles' dam Ysoldina only won one of her 11 races but finished third in the 2005 Poule d'Essai des Pouliches. As of 2017, she has five named foals, four of whom have won. With his Epsom Derby win, Wings of Eagles became his dam's first stakes winner.

As a yearling, Wings of Eagles was sold for 220,000 euros to MV Magnier at the Arqana August Yearling Sale. The colt was sent into training with Aidan O'Brien at Ballydoyle. Like many Coolmore horses, the official details of his ownership changed from race to race: he was sometimes listed as being the property of Derrick Smith, while on other occasions he has been described as being owned by a partnership of Derrick Smith, Michael Tabor and Susan Magnier.

== Racing career ==
=== 2016: two-year-old season ===
Wings of Eagles began his racing career in a maiden race over seven furlongs at Galway Races on 29 July in which he was ridden by Seamie Heffernan and started at odds of 7/1 in an eleven-runner field. He showed some reluctance to enter the starting stalls and made no impact in the race, finishing seventh behind the Dermot Weld-trained Lost in Silence. Three weeks later the colt was partnered by Emmet McNamara for a similar event at Killarney Racecourse and started the 5/2 second choice in the betting behind the John Oxx-trained Birds of Prey. After racing in third place Wings of Eagles went to the front a furlong out and won by one and a quarter lengths from the favourite despite showing signs of inexperience (running "green"). Wings of Eagles was then sent to England for the Listed Zetland Stakes over ten furlongs on 10 October at Newmarket Racecourse. Ridden by Ryan Moore he started at odds of 10/1 and finished fourth behind the filly Coronet. On his final appearance of the season the colt was sent to France and stepped up to Group 1 class for the Critérium de Saint-Cloud on 30 October. He never looked likely to win and finished ninth of the thirteen runners, seven lengths behind the winner Waldgeist.

=== 2017: three-year-old season ===
Wings of Eagles began his three-year-old campaign in the Group 3 Chester Vase. In the beginning of the race, he was towards the rear of the field but rallied to finish second as part of a 1-2-3 finish for his trainer Aidan O'Brien. Following the race, O'Brien said he was "delighted" with Wings of Eagles' performance. "We liked him last year and he had a lovely run in France – he was back a bit (ninth in the Critérium de Saint-Cloud) but it was a lovely run... [i]f he was going to be ready for the Derby, he needed to run and he travelled well and settled well."

For his next start in the Epsom Derby, Wings of Eagles was paired with jockey Padraig Beggy for the first time. Before the race, Beggy had never ridden in the Epsom Derby. Wings of Eagles was one of six starters for O'Brien in the Derby and was generally overlooked by bettors in favour of his stablemates, going off at odds of 40–1. Beggy said he was not worried about the long odds. "That's my first ride, but when you're riding one for Aidan [O'Brien] you don't worry about the price, they always have a chance." In the Derby, Wings of Eagles was caught back at the start and sat in the back of the field for most of the race. Three furlongs before the finish, Wings of Eagles was third last, but began rapidly closing. Entering the final furlong, it appeared as if his stablemate Cliffs of Moher was going to be the victor, but Wings of Eagles came "from the clouds" in the final strides to win the Derby by 3/4 lengths. After the race Beggy said "Turning in, I knew I’d pass the back half of the field – I wasn’t sure about the whole lot, though. Two out I thought I had a chance and a furlong out I thought I’d win. He's actually won a shade cosily. I’ve won plenty of big handicaps but I could get used to this". O'Brien commented "I don’t know what happened there. All I know is that Padraig gave the winner a brilliant ride. He knew all about him. We knew Ryan's horse was a bit of a baby and he just tired in the last 50 yards. We thought Wings Of Eagles would even get a bit further".

On 1 July Wings of Eagles started 2/1 favourite ahead of Cracksman and Waldgeist for the Irish Derby at the Curragh. Ridden by Ryan Moore he was restrained in the early stages before staying on in the straight and finished third, beaten a neck and a short head by Capri and Cracksman. After the race it was discovered that the colt had sustained a serious leg injury described as a "fracture of his left front sesamoid". He was immediately retired from racing.

== Pedigree ==
Pedigree of Wings of Eagles (FR), bay colt, 2014
Sire Pour Moi (IRE) 2008	Montjeu (IRE); 1996	Sadler's Wells	Northern Dancer
Sire Pour Moi (IRE) 2008	Montjeu (IRE); 1996	Sadler's Wells	Fairy Bridge
Sire Pour Moi (IRE) 2008	Montjeu (IRE); 1996	Floripedes	Top Ville
Sire Pour Moi (IRE) 2008	Montjeu (IRE); 1996	Floripedes	Toute Cy
Sire Pour Moi (IRE) 2008	Gwynn (IRE); 1997	Darshaan	Shirley Heights
Sire Pour Moi (IRE) 2008	Gwynn (IRE); 1997	Darshaan	Delsy
Sire Pour Moi (IRE) 2008	Gwynn (IRE); 1997	Victoress	Conquistador Cielo
Sire Pour Moi (IRE) 2008	Gwynn (IRE); 1997	Victoress	Royal Statute
Dam Ysoldina (FR) 2002	Kendor (FR); 1986	Kenmare	Kalamoun
Dam Ysoldina (FR) 2002	Kendor (FR); 1986	Kenmare	Belle of Ireland
Dam Ysoldina (FR) 2002	Kendor (FR); 1986	Belle Mecene	Gay Mecene
Dam Ysoldina (FR) 2002	Kendor (FR); 1986	Belle Mecene	Djaka Belle
Dam Ysoldina (FR) 2002	Rotina (IRE); 1988	Crystal Glitters	Blushing Groom
Dam Ysoldina (FR) 2002	Rotina (IRE); 1988	Crystal Glitters	Tales to Tell
Dam Ysoldina (FR) 2002	Rotina (IRE); 1988	Rudolfina	Pharly
Dam Ysoldina (FR) 2002	Rotina (IRE); 1988	Rudolfina	Rojanya (Family 14-c)
