= Leopardstown Derby Trial =

Flat horse race in Ireland

- Class: Group 3
- Location: Leopardstown; County Dublin, Ireland
- Inaugurated: 1971
- Race type: Flat / Thoroughbred
- Sponsor: Cashel Palace Hotel
- Website: Leopardstown.com

Race information
- Distance: 1m 2f (2,012 metres)
- Surface: Turf
- Track: Left-handed
- Qualification: Three-year-olds
- Weight: 9 st 5 lb Allowances; 3 lb for fillies
- Purse: €80,000 (2024); 1st: €47,200

Leopardstown Derby Trial Stakes
2026
| James J Braddock | Pierre Bonnard | Endorsement |

Previous years
2025
Delacroix | Purview | Tennessee Stud
2024
Los Angeles | Euphoric | Taraj
2023
Sprewell | Up And Under | Proud And Regal
2022
Stone Age | Glory Daze | French Claim
2021
Bolshoi Ballet | Lough Derg | Fernando Vichi

2020-2011
2020
Cormorant | Russian Emperor | Iberia
2019
Broome | Blenheim Palace | Sovereign
2018
Hazapour | Delano Roosevelt | The Pentagon
2017
Douglas Macarthur | Yucatan | Capri
2016
Moonlight Magic | Shogun | Idaho
2015
Success Days | Summaya | Carbon Dating
2014
Fascinating Rock | Ebanoran | Geoffrey Chaucer
2013
Battle Of Marengo | Loch Garman | Little White Cloud
2012
Light Heavy | Tower Rock | Wrote
2011
Recital | Memphis Tennessee | Regent Street

2010-2001
2010
Midas Touch | Address Unknown | At First Sight
2009
Fame And Glory | Mourayan | Fergus Mciver
2008
Casual Conquest | Washington Irving | Moiqen
2006
Dylan Thomas | Mountain | Youmzain
2005
Fracas | Alayan | Grand Central
2004
Yeats | Relaxed Gesture | Medicinal
2003
Alamshar | The Great Gatsby | Brian Boru
2002
High Chaparral | In Time's Eye | Surveyor
2001
Galileo | Exaltation | El Bueno

2000-1991
2000
Sinndar | Bach | Muakaad
1999
Port Bayou | Tchaikovsky | River Canyon
1998
Risk Material | Sunshine Street | Takarian
1997
Ashley Park | Casey Tibbs | Ebadiyla
1996
Truth Or Dare | Touch Judge | Ashbal
1995
Humbel | Shemaran | Johansson
1994
Artema | Cajarian | Bawardi
1993
Perfect Imposter | Advocat | Foresee
1992
St Jovite | Firing Line | Garabagh
1991
Runyon | George Augustus | Smooth Performance

1990-1988
1990
Anvari | Dovekie | Spinning
1989
Phantom Breeze | Upward Trend | Dail Eireann
1988
Kris Kringle | Maksud | Little Bighorn

The Leopardstown Derby Trial, currently run as the Cashel Palace Hotel Derby Trial, is a Group 3 flat horse race in Ireland open to three-year-old thoroughbreds. It is run over a distance of 1 mile and 2 furlongs (2,012 metres) at Leopardstown in May.

== History ==
Established in 1971, the event was originally called the Nijinsky Stakes. It was named after Nijinsky, the previous year's Irish-trained English Triple Crown winner.

For a period the Nijinsky Stakes held Group 2 status. It was open to older horses for several years from the mid-1970s.

The race was renamed the Derby Trial Stakes in 1984. From this point it was sponsored by Derrinstown Stud. It was downgraded to Group 3 level in the early 1990s, and promoted back to Group 2 in 2003. It was downgraded again to Group 3 status in 2014. Derrinstown Stud's sponsorship ended after the 2021 race and there was no sponsor in 2022 or 2023. Since 2024 the race has been sponsored by Cashel Palace Hotel.

The Derby Trial can serve as a trial for the Epsom Derby. The last horse to win both races was High Chaparral in 2002. The last winner to achieve victory in the Irish Derby was Los Angeles in 2024.

The title "Nijinsky Stakes" was later assigned to a different race at Leopardstown, a Listed event for three-year-olds in June which is now run as the King George V Cup.

== Records ==
Leading jockey (8 wins):

- Christy Roche – Ballymore (1973), Noelino (1979), Toca Madera (1986), St Jovite (1992), Perfect Imposter (1993), Truth or Dare (1996), Ashley Park (1997), Risk Material (1998)

Leading trainer (17 wins):

- Aidan O'Brien – Risk Material (1998), Galileo (2001), High Chaparral (2002), Yeats (2004), Dylan Thomas (2006), Archipenko (2007), Fame and Glory (2009), Midas Touch (2010), Recital (2011), Battle of Marengo (2013), Douglas Macarthur (2017), Broome (2019), Cormorant (2020), Bolshoi Ballet (2021), Stone Age (2022), Los Angeles (2024), Delacroix (2025)

== Winners ==
| Year | Winner | Jockey | Trainer | Time |
|---|---|---|---|---|
| 1971 | Sea Friend | Buster Parnell | Paddy Prendergast | 2:12.90 |
| 1972 | Boucher | Johnny Roe | Vincent O'Brien | 2:10.00 |
| 1973 | Ballymore | Christy Roche | Paddy Prendergast |
| 1974 | Hail the Pirates | Lester Piggott | Vincent O'Brien |
| 1975 | Nuthatch | Wally Swinburn | John Oxx, Sr. | 2:12.20 |
| 1976 | Meneval | Lester Piggott | Vincent O'Brien |
| 1977 | Orchestra | Raymond Carroll | John Oxx, Sr. | 2:15.20 |
| 1978 | Slaney Idol | Wally Swinburn | Liam Browne |
| 1979 | Noelino | Christy Roche | Paddy Prendergast | 2:20.50 |
| 1980 | Ramian | Wally Swinburn | Dermot Weld |
| 1981 | Young Kildare | Michael Kinane | Liam Browne | 2:18.90 |
| 1982 | Golden Fleece | Pat Eddery | Vincent O'Brien | 2:06.80 |
| 1983 | Salmon Leap | Pat Eddery | Vincent O'Brien | 2:20.70 |
| 1984 | Sadler's Wells | George McGrath | Vincent O'Brien | 2:11.50 |
| 1985 | Theatrical | Michael Kinane | Dermot Weld | 2:13.80 |
| 1986 | Toca Madera | Christy Roche | Liam Browne |
| 1987 | Seattle Dancer | Cash Asmussen | Vincent O'Brien | 2:07.90 |
| 1988 | Kris Kringle | John Reid | Vincent O'Brien | 2:11.20 |
| 1989 | Phantom Breeze | Michael Kinane | Dermot Weld | 2:09.60 |
| 1990 | Anvari | Basil Marcus | Clive Brittain | 2:03.40 |
| 1991 | Runyonii | Stephen Craine | Tommy Stack | 2:07.80 |
| 1992 | St Jovite | Christy Roche | Jim Bolger | 2:10.40 |
| 1993 | Perfect Imposter | Christy Roche | Jim Bolger | 2:07.90 |
| 1994 | Artema | Michael Kinane | Dermot Weld | 2:08.90 |
| 1995 | Humbel | Michael Kinane | Dermot Weld | 2:06.30 |
| 1996 | Truth or Dare | Christy Roche | Charles O'Brien | 2:05.00 |
| 1997 | Ashley Park | Christy Roche | Charles O'Brien | 2:15.30 |
| 1998 | Risk Material | Christy Roche | Aidan O'Brien | 2:06.90 |
| 1999 | Port Bayou | Pat Shanahan | Dermot Weld | 2:16.00 |
| 2000 | Sinndar | Johnny Murtagh | John Oxx | 2:04.90 |
| 2001 | Galileo | Seamie Heffernan | Aidan O'Brien | 2:08.50 |
| 2002 | High Chaparral | Seamie Heffernan | Aidan O'Brien | 2:03.50 |
| 2003 | Alamshar | Johnny Murtagh | John Oxx | 2:07.40 |
| 2004 | Yeats | Jamie Spencer | Aidan O'Brien | 2:10.30 |
| 2005 | Fracas | Jamie Spencer | David Wachman | 2:16.40 |
| 2006 | Dylan Thomas | Seamie Heffernan | Aidan O'Brien | 2:07.80 |
| 2007 | Archipenko | Michael Kinane | Aidan O'Brien | 2:07.90 |
| 2008 | Casual Conquest | Pat Smullen | Dermot Weld | 2:05.35 |
| 2009 | Fame and Glory | Seamie Heffernan | Aidan O'Brien | 2:03.62 |
| 2010 | Midas Touch | Johnny Murtagh | Aidan O'Brien | 2:02.54 |
| 2011 | Recital | Kieren Fallon | Aidan O'Brien | 2:04.09 |
| 2012 | Light Heavy | Kevin Manning | Jim Bolger | 2:11.50 |
| 2013 | Battle of Marengo | Joseph O'Brien | Aidan O'Brien | 2:07.79 |
| 2014 | Fascinating Rock (Note: Ebanoran finished first in 2014, but was relegated to second place following a stewards' inquiry) | Pat Smullen | Dermot Weld | 2:14.95 |
| 2015 | Success Days | Shane Foley | Ken Condon | 2:19.50 |
| 2016 | Moonlight Magic | Kevin Manning | Jim Bolger | 2:07.74 |
| 2017 | Douglas Macarthur | Emmet McNamara | Aidan O'Brien | 2:09.50 |
| 2018 | Hazapour | Declan McDonogh | Dermot Weld | 2:08.58 |
| 2019 | Broome | Donnacha O'Brien | Aidan O'Brien | 2:09.18 |
| 2020 | Cormorant (Note: The 2020 race was run in June due to the COVID-19 pandemic in the Republic of Ireland) | Padraig Beggy | Aidan O'Brien | 2:08.88 |
| 2021 | Bolshoi Ballet | Ryan Moore | Aidan O'Brien | 2:07.37 |
| 2022 | Stone Age | Ryan Moore | Aidan O'Brien | 2:08.25 |
| 2023 | Sprewell | Shane Foley | Jessica Harrington | 2:15.57 |
| 2024 | Los Angeles | Wayne Lordan | Aidan O'Brien | 2:06.82 |
| 2025 | Delacroix | Wayne Lordan | Aidan O'Brien | 2:10.59 |
| 2026 | James J Braddock | Dylan Browne McMonagle | Joseph O'Brien | 2:08:20 |

== See also ==
- Horse racing in Ireland
- List of Irish flat horse races
