= Cape Blanco (horse) =

Irish-bred Thoroughbred racehorse

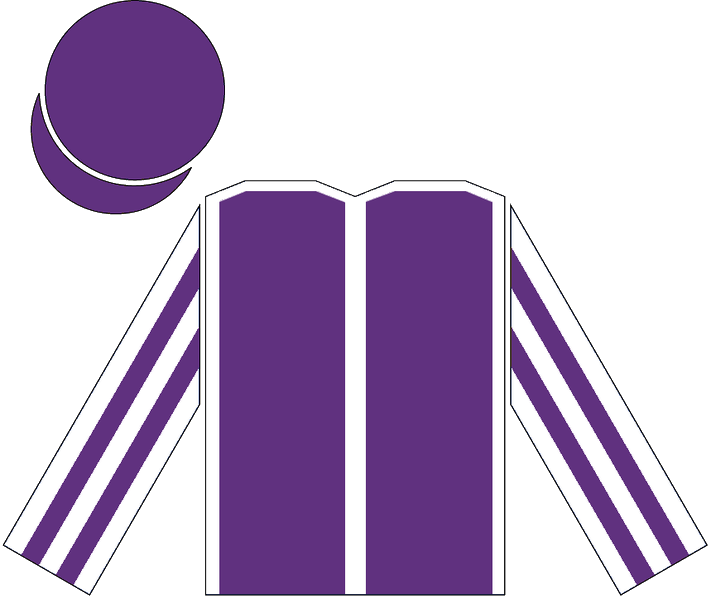
- Racing silks of Derrick Smith
- Sire: Galileo
- Grandsire: Sadler's Wells
- Dam: Laurel Delight
- Damsire: Presidium
- Sex: Stallion
- Foaled: 2007
- Country: Ireland
- Colour: Chestnut
- Breeder: Tower Bloodstock
- Owner: Smith/Magnier/Tabor/Mrs F Hay
- Trainer: Aidan O'Brien
- Record: 15: 9-1-0
- Earnings: £2,574,670 or $3,855,665

Major wins
- Tyros Stakes (2009); Futurity Stakes (Ireland) (2009); Dante Stakes (2010); Irish Derby (2010); Irish Champion Stakes (2010); Man o' War Stakes (2011); Arlington Million (2011); Joe Hirsch Turf Classic Stakes (2011)

Awards
- Irish Three-Year-Old Colt of the Year (2010); American Champion Male Turf Horse (2011)
- Last updated on February 20, 2012

Cape Blanco (foaled 20 April 2007 in Ireland) is an Irish Thoroughbred racehorse who won five Group One/Grade I races from 2009 to 2011. He also won twice at Group 2 level and once at Group 3 level between 2009 and 2010. He was the Irish Three-Year-Old Colt of the Year in 2010 and also the American Champion Male Turf Horse for the 2011 season.

== Background ==
Cape Blanco was sired by champion sire Galileo out of the Presidium mare Laurel Delight. As a foal of Laurel Delight he is a half-brother to the Kelso Stakes winner Mr O'Brien. Cape Blanco was trained throughout his racing career by Aidan O'Brien at Ballydoyle Stables near Cashel in County Tipperary for John Magnier and his Coolmore Stud associates.

== Racing career ==
He is the winner of the 2010 Irish Derby and Irish Champion Stakes as well as being placed second in the 2010 King George VI and Queen Elizabeth Stakes behind Harbinger. In 2011, he won the Grade 1 Man o' War Stakes at Belmont Park, Arlington Million at Arlington Park and Joe Hirsch Turf Classic Invitational Stakes at Belmont Park, New York, USA. In the last-named Grade 1 classic race, he sustained a knee fracture and was retired to stud after the race.

== Assessment ==
In the 2010 World Thoroughbred Racehorse Rankings Cape Blanco was rated the eighth best horse in the world on a mark of 126.

In addition, Cape Blanco was given a Timeform rating of 130 for top middle-distance performers in 2010 alongside his stablemate Fame and Glory.

Finally for his final racing year in 2011, Cape Blanco was given a Timeform rating of 128 with a global ranking at number 18.

== Stud career ==
According to a news release by Coolmore Stud, Cape Blanco will stand for them at the Ashford Stud in Kentucky for the 2012 breeding season. He moved to Japan in 2015 and has also been shuttled to stand in New Zealand at Cambridge Stud. His foals have included Californiagoldrush (Sands Point Stakes) and Lance of Puraana (Mainichi Hai).
