= Enable (horse) =

British-bred Thoroughbred racehorse

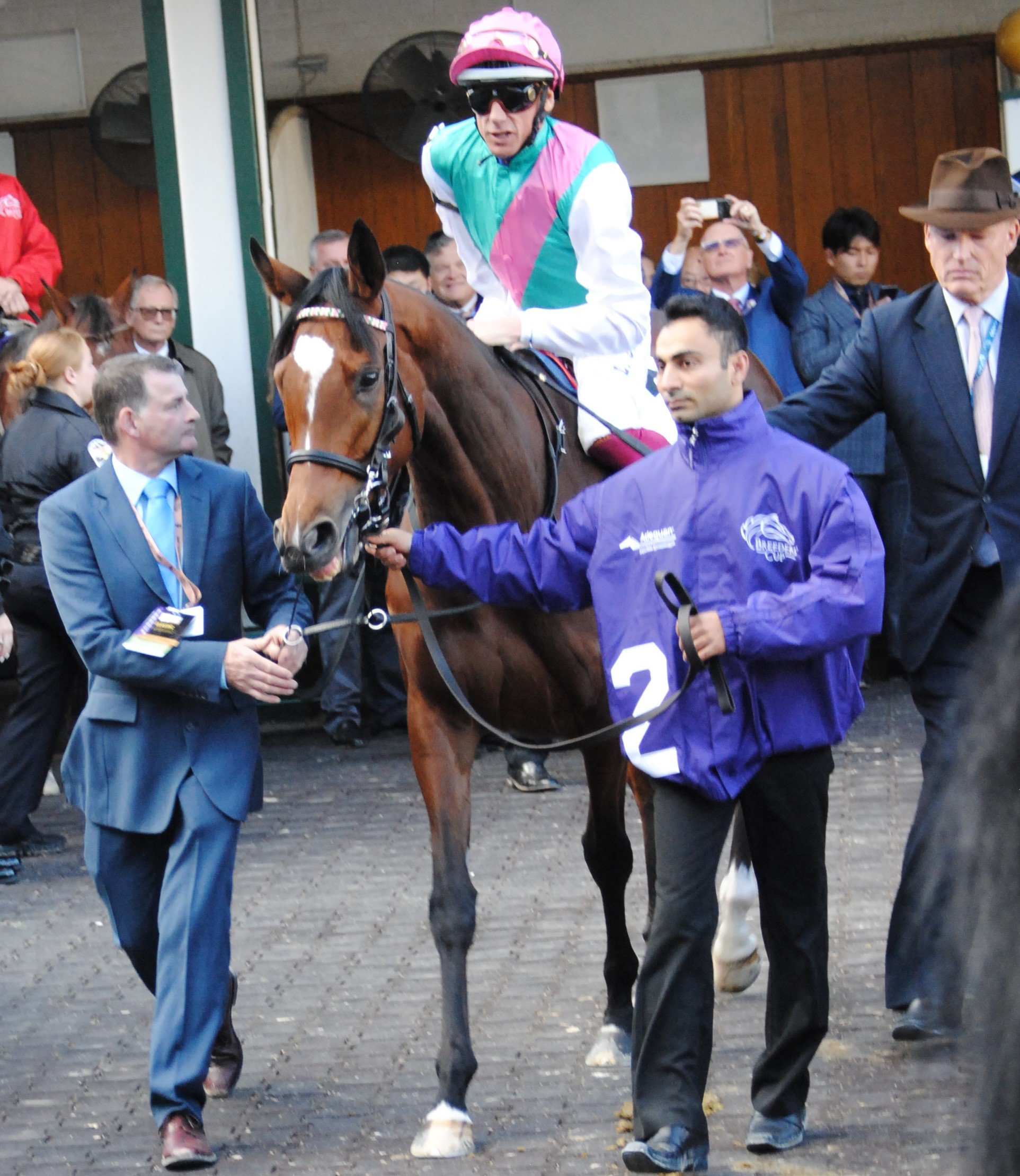
- Enable at the 2018 Breeders' Cup
- Sire: Nathaniel
- Grandsire: Galileo
- Dam: Concentric
- Damsire: Sadler's Wells
- Sex: Mare
- Foaled: 12 February 2014
- Country: United Kingdom
- Colour: Bay
- Breeder: Juddmonte Farms
- Owner: Khalid Abdullah
- Trainer: John Gosden
- Record: 19: 15-2-1
- Earnings: £10,724,320

Major wins
- Cheshire Oaks (2017); Epsom Oaks (2017); Irish Oaks (2017); King George VI and Queen Elizabeth Stakes (2017, 2019, 2020); Yorkshire Oaks (2017, 2019); Prix de l'Arc de Triomphe (2017, 2018); September Stakes (2018, 2020); Breeders' Cup Turf (2018); Eclipse Stakes (2019)

Awards
- Cartier Champion Three-year-old Filly (2017); Cartier Horse of the Year (2017, 2019); Cartier Champion Older Horse (2018, 2019); British Racing Hall of Fame (2025); Timeform rating: 134

Enable (foaled 12 February 2014) is a champion British Thoroughbred racehorse and broodmare who won 15 of her 19 races, including 11 Group One races. Her biggest wins include the Breeders' Cup Turf, Prix de l'Arc de Triomphe, Epsom Oaks, Irish Oaks, King George VI and Queen Elizabeth Stakes, Eclipse Stakes and Yorkshire Oaks. Enable was the 2017 and 2019 European Horse of the Year.

Enable's racing career lasted from November 2016 to October 2020. After winning her only race as a two-year-old in 2016, she emerged as the dominant middle-distance horse in Europe in 2017, winning the Cheshire Oaks, Epsom Oaks, Irish Oaks, King George VI and Queen Elizabeth Stakes, Yorkshire Oaks and Prix de l'Arc de Triomphe.

As a four-year-old, Enable won the September Stakes, a second Prix de l'Arc de Triomphe and the Breeders' Cup Turf. In doing so, she became the first Arc winner to win the Breeders' Cup Turf in the same year. In 2019, Enable won the Eclipse Stakes and recorded repeat victories in the King George VI and Queen Elizabeth Stakes and the Yorkshire Oaks before her long unbeaten run came to an end when she finished second to Waldgeist in the Prix de l'Arc de Triomphe. As a six-year-old, Enable ran second to Ghaiyyath in the Eclipse before becoming the first horse to win a third King George VI and Queen Elizabeth Stakes. In the autumn of 2020, Enable won another September Stakes before failing in her second attempt to win a third Prix de l'Arc Triomphe.

== Background ==
Enable was bred in England by Khalid Abdullah's Juddmonte Farms. She is a bay mare with a large white star and a narrow irregular blaze, a white sock on her left hind leg and smaller white markings on her front feet. She was sent into training with John Gosden at Newmarket, Suffolk.

Enable is from the first crop of foals sired by Nathaniel who won the King George VI and Queen Elizabeth Stakes in 2011 and the Eclipse Stakes in the following year. Her dam Concentric showed good form in France, winning a Listed race and finishing second in the Prix de Flore. She is also a full sister to the dam of Flintshire.

== Racing career ==
=== 2016: two-year-old season ===
Enable made her only appearance as a two-year-old in a maiden race over one mile on the synthetic Tapeta track at Newcastle Racecourse on 28 November 2016 and started at odds of 7/2 in a field of nine fillies. Ridden by Robert Havlin, she was restrained towards the rear before taking the lead inside the final furlong and drawing away to win by three and three quarter lengths.

=== 2017: three-year-old season ===
==== Spring ====
Enable began her second season in a minor stakes race over ten furlongs at Newbury Racecourse on 21 April when she was partnered by William Buick. Starting at odds of 5/1, she stayed on well in the closing stages to finish third behind her stablemate Shutter Speed and Raheen House. Frankie Dettori took the ride when Enable moved up in class and distance to contest the Cheshire Oaks over eleven and a half furlongs at Chester Racecourse on 10 May and was made the 2/1 second choice in the seven-runner field behind the Aidan O'Brien-trained Alluringly.. After racing in second place, Enable took the lead three furlongs out and went clear of her rivals before being eased down by Dettori to win by one and three quarter lengths.

==== Summer ====
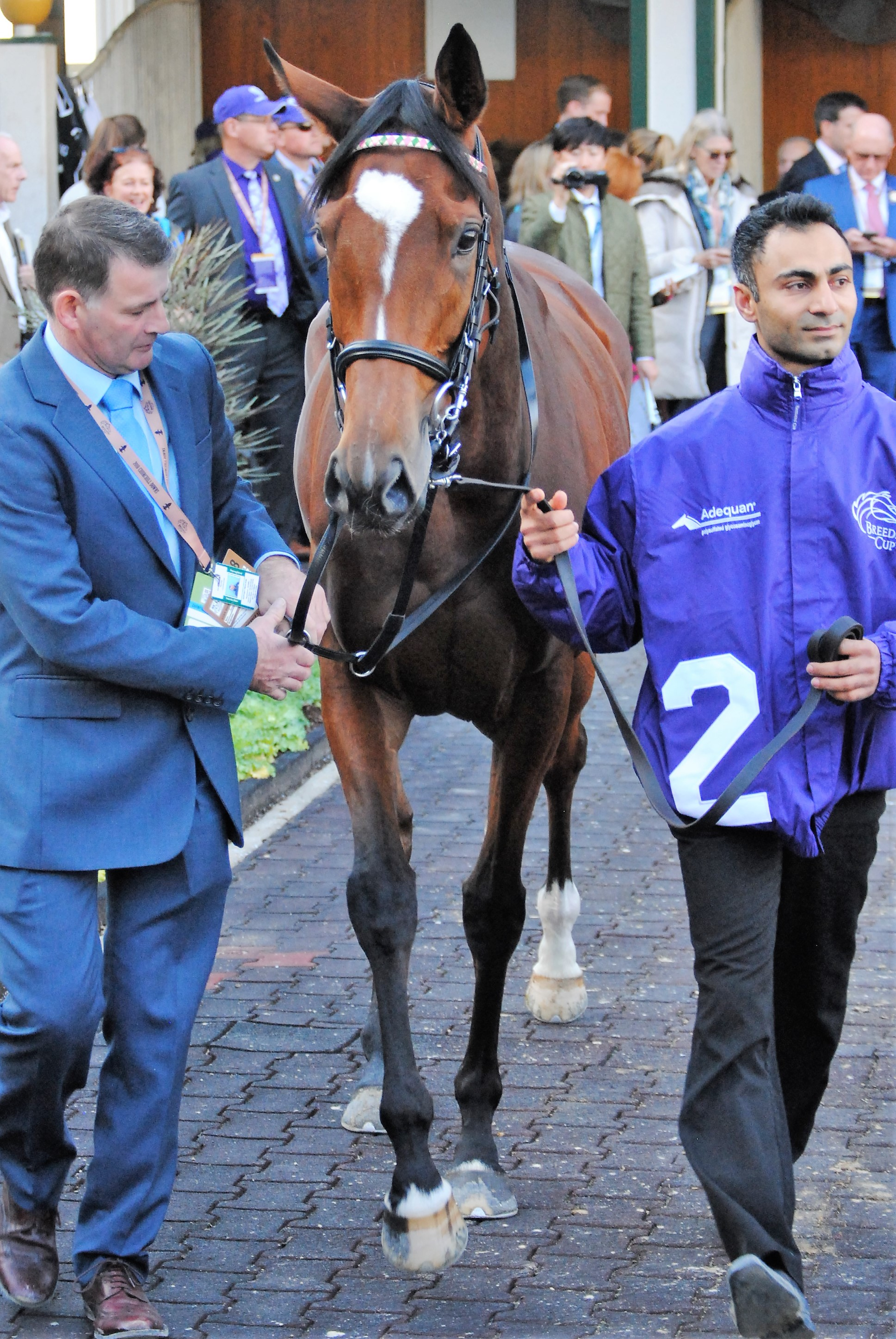
Enable at Churchill Downs in 2018

On 2 June, Enable was one of nine fillies to contest the 238th running of the Oaks Stakes over one and a half miles at Epsom Racecourse. The race was run in heavy rain after a thunderstorm struck the course shortly before the start. The Irish filly Rhododendron, ridden by Ryan Moore, was made the 8/11 favourite with Enable second choice in the betting on 6/1 alongside the Godolphin challenger Sobetsu (winner of the Prix Saint-Alary). The other runners included Alluringly, Natavia (Fillies' Trial Stakes), Coronet (Zetland Stakes) and Horseplay (Pretty Polly Stakes). With Dettori again in the saddle, Enable raced in third place before going to the front two furlongs out with Rhododendron as her only serious challenger. In the closing stages Enable drew right away from the favourite to win by five lengths with another six lengths back to Alluringly in third place. After the race Dettori commented "When I saw Ryan wasn't moving alongside me, I thought I was in trouble, but once I saw his distress signals coming I knew my filly would stay right to the end. She's only run three times, she's very good. She's still a bit of a frame but I think she'll get better and better."

Enable made her next appearance in the Irish Oaks at the Curragh on 15 July. She was partnered by Dettori who had just returned to riding after sustaining an arm injury at Yarmouth on 13 June. She was made the 2/5 favourite ahead of her stablemate Coronet, whilst the other eight runners included Rain Goddess (runner-up in the Pretty Polly Stakes), Alluringly, Intricately (Moyglare Stud Stakes) and Eziyra (C L Weld Park Stakes). After tracking the leader Rain Goddess, Enable went to the front two furlongs out, accelerated away from her rivals and won "easily" by five and a half lengths. Dettori commented "Enable is a very special filly and it was so important to ride her – she is a true professional and I think she has improved since Epsom. She has a good turn of foot and put the race to bed".

Less than two weeks after her win at the Curragh, Enable, with Dettori again in the saddle, was matched against older horses and male opposition in the King George VI and Queen Elizabeth Stakes at Ascot Racecourse. She started the 5/4 favourite against nine opponents including Highland Reel, Jack Hobbs, Idaho, Ulysses and My Dream Boat. She raced in second place behind the pacemaker Maverick Wave before going to the front entering the straight. She accelerated several lengths clear of her rivals and never looked in any danger of defeat coming home four and a half lengths clear of Ulysses with Idaho in third place. After the race Dettori, who was riding at his minimum weight of 119 pounds said, "I haven't had a feeling like that since Golden Horn in the Arc... She's top-drawer and that's three times she's proved it, three times that she's won by a wide margin. I didn't want to see a sprint and I knew she stays, so I kicked for home early". John Gosden described Enable as being "as good a filly as I've ever trained... she just takes the race by the horns" before suggesting the Yorkshire Oaks and the Prix de l'Arc de Triomphe as future targets.

As Gosden had predicted, Enable made her next appearance in the Yorkshire Oaks at York Racecourse on 24 August. She went off the 1/4 favourite against five opponents including Queen's Trust (Breeders' Cup Filly & Mare Turf), Nezwaah (Pretty Polly Stakes), Coronet and Alluringly. She took the lead from the start, drew away from the field in the straight and won "very readily" by five lengths from Coronet. Gosden commented "There was no obvious pace so I said to Frankie that he could do his own thing. She got lonely in the last part, she was looking around and idling. It's not her favourite way of racing but she can do it that way. It was a lovely prep for the Arc, and it's a nice run-in now. She'd be the best mile-and-a-half filly that I've trained".

==== Autumn ====
Enable started odds-on favourite for the Prix de l'Arc de Triomphe on 1 October at Chantilly. As she had not been among the original entries, her owner had to pay a supplementary fee of €120,000 to run her in the race. Ulysses and Idaho were again in opposition, whilst the other runners included Order of St George, Winter, Capri, Satono Diamond and Seventh Heaven. After racing in third place, Enable took the lead in the straight, went clear of the field and stayed on to win by two and a half lengths from Cloth of Stars. Dettori commented "It was too perfect... It happened exactly like I thought and she won like I thought. Usually in an Arc something happens but it was so smooth, so effortless" while Gosden added "She's really only had one very busy season so there's a possibility she might stay in training next year and go to the new Longchamp. She's truly exceptional, straight out of the top drawer".

On 16 November 2017 at the Cartier Racing Awards Enable was named Champion Three-year-old Filly and Horse of the Year In the 2017 World's Best Racehorse Rankings, Enable was rated the fifth-best horse in the world and the best three-year-old filly with a rating of 129.

=== 2018: four-year-old season ===
In May 2018, it was announced that Enable had suffered a "training setback" and would not race as a four-year-old until August at the earliest. On 6 September, Enable made a belated seasonal debut in the September Stakes on the synthetic polytrack surface at Kempton, winning by 3 1/2 lengths over Crystal Ocean. After the race Gosden said "She's 80 per cent fit, 85 per cent if you had to stretch it. She is in a good place mentally. She loves her racing. It frustrated her when the other horses went out on the Heath every morning and she couldn't. It's a hard thing for her to stand around doing nothing".

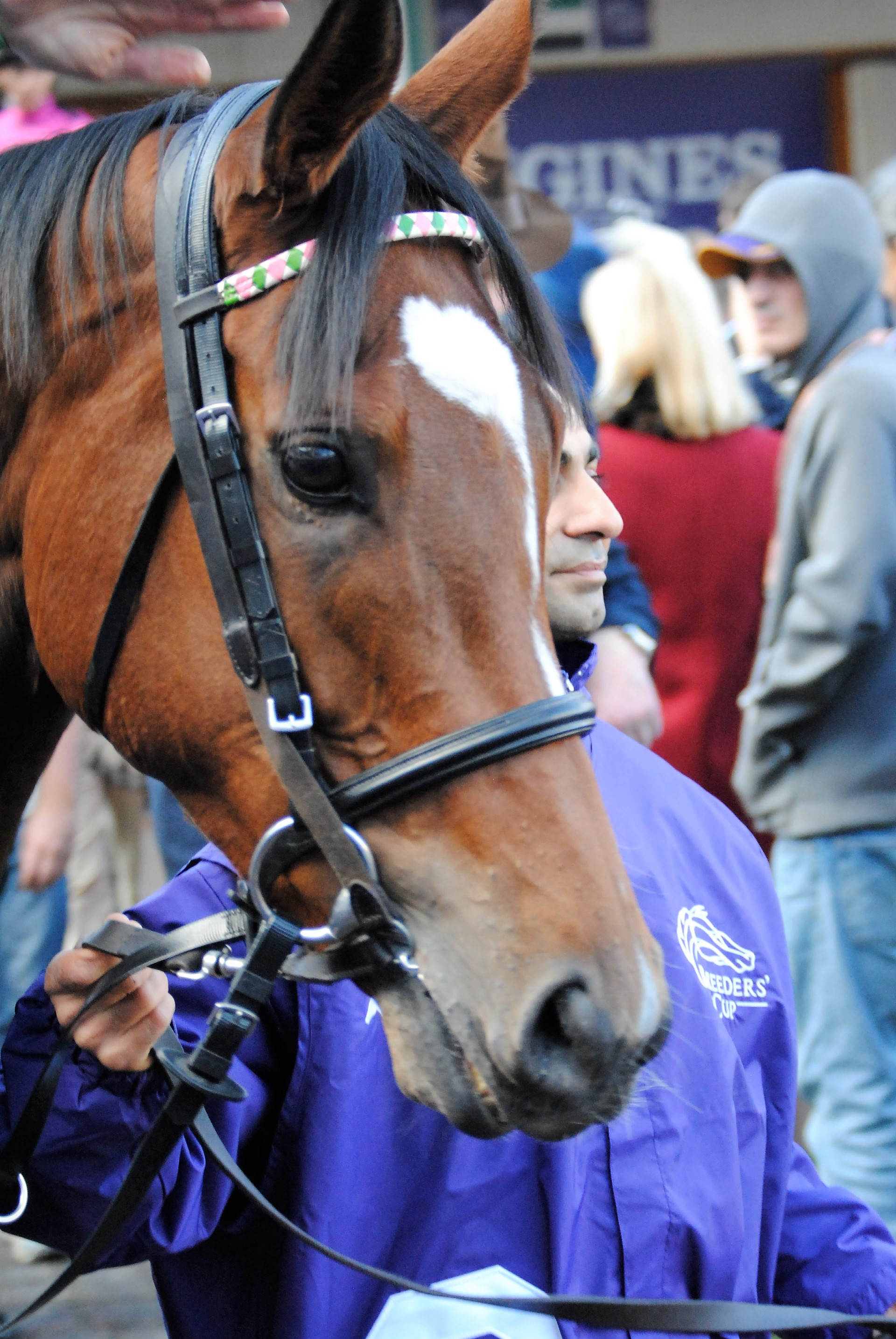
Enable prior to winning the Breeders' Cup Turf

Enable was given a month's break prior to the 2018 Prix de l'Arc de Triomphe, in which she attempted to become the eighth horse, and the first trained in England, to win the race for a second time.. She started as the favourite ahead of Sea of Class, Waldgeist and Kew Gardens, while the other fifteen runners included Capri, Cloth of Stars, Talismanic, Study of Man (Prix du Jockey Club) and Clincher (Kyoto Kinen). Nelson set the pace before giving way to Capri in the straight but Enable, having tracked the leaders from the start, moved smoothly into the lead 300 metres from the finish. After looking likely to win easily she came under strong pressure in the last 100 metres but held on to win by a short neck from Sea of Class. Dettori said "as we got to the false straight, the life in the old girl came back. I knew then we were in business. I waited as long as I could and, when I said 'come on, let's go', the trademark turn of foot was there... She wasn't the Enable of last year but she's got the job done". John Gosden commented "It's not been the preparation we wanted, it has been very difficult, and we had a hiccup between Kempton and here with a slight temperature thing, so it has not been easy. She was not at her best today. I have had a difficult year with her, it is entirely down to the filly and her guts and a lovely ride from Frankie. She has got the job done and it is down to her mind, she is a wonderful filly".

In her final run of the season, Enable went to the United States for the Breeders' Cup Turf at Churchill Downs on 3 November. She was the 8/13 favourite ahead of 12 opponents including Waldgeist, Talismanic and Magical from Europe, while the only North American runners given any serious chance were Robert Bruce (Arlington Million) and Channel Maker (Joe Hirsch Turf Classic). After racing in mid-division, Enable moved up on the wide outside on the final turn to take the lead in the straight but was immediately joined by Magical, ridden by Ryan Moore. The two fillies pulled well clear of the rest and at the line Enable prevailed by three quarters of a length with a gap of nine lengths back to the 80/1 outsider Sadler's Joy in third. Explaining the race, Dettori said "She didn't break that well and then the pace was on straight away. I managed to get out to four off the fence, and then she was moving good again. I was waiting for her to give me the message that she was ready to go, and I could see Magical on my inside. Magical took me on pretty early and then it was a punch-up to see who was the best. She went half a length up and I knew she was fighting for me but Ryan was like a wasp that wouldn't go away. The ground made it hard for her today, but she's a superstar". Enable was the first Arc winner to win the Breeders' Cup Turf in the same year.

At the 2018 Cartier Awards, Enable was named Cartier Champion Older Horse. In the 2018 World's Best Racehorse Rankings, Enable was placed eighth, with a rating of 125.

=== 2019: five-year-old season ===
In 2019, Enable missed scheduled entries in the Coronation Cup at Epsom and at Royal Ascot before returning to the track for the Eclipse Stakes over ten furlongs at Sandown Park on 6 July. Magical appeared to be her biggest threat, while the other six runners were Regal Reality (Brigadier Gerard Stakes), Telecaster (Dante Stakes), Mustashry, Zabeel Prince, Hunting Horn (Hampton Court Stakes) and Danceteria (La Coupe). Starting the 4/6 favourite, Enable tracked the front-running Hunting Horn before taking the lead two furlongs out and held off the challenge of Magical to win by three quarters of a length. She became the third mare to win the race after Pebbles and Kooyonga, and the first five-year-old mare to take the prize. Frankie Dettori said "I'm as ecstatic as when I won my first race on her... Her longevity has been incredible. I never stop getting excited when I ride her in the morning. She's very special. I really love her... She's got so many gears and the unbelievable will to win. She's got everything."

Three weeks after her win at Sandown, Enable started at odds of 8/15 as she attempted to repeat her 2017 success in the King George VI and Queen Elizabeth Stakes. Her ten opponents included Crystal Ocean, Anthony Van Dyck, Defoe, Waldgeist and Cheval Grand. She raced towards the rear of the field as Norway and Magic Wand set a strong pace before moving up quickly approaching the final turn. Enable took the lead from Crystal Ocean two furlongs out and held off a renewed challenge from the latter in the closing stages to win by a neck with Waldgeist a length and a quarter back in third place. After the race Dettori said "At the five [furlong pole], I looked up and thought, the only one I've got to beat is Crystal Ocean. I've got to get on to his tail. Then [James Doyle on Crystal Ocean] was sitting pretty going really well, so I jumped on him and made a race of it, and I probably took him by surprise. Then, he was fighting back and the gloves were off. In fairness, he served it up to me and we had a right titanic battle... She is extraordinary and she really surprised me. She's an amazing horse in every way: ability, courageous, uncomplicated."

On 22 August, three horses—Magical, Lah Ti Dar (Middleton Stakes) and the 100/1 outsider South Sea Pearl—seemed able to oppose Enable as she ran for a second Yorkshire Oaks. Starting at odds of 1/4, Enable led from the start, saw off a challenge from Magical in the last quarter mile and won by two and three quarter lengths. The race was regarded as a trial for the Prix de l'Arc de Triomphe and Gosden commented "This was a lovely prep for her, a gorgeous race in its own right and we couldn't be more pleased with her... She has this amazingly competitive mind. She's just a great filly with a great constitution."

On 6 October, Enable started the 1/2 favourite in the Prix de l'Arc de Triomphe as she attempted to record an unprecedented third success. After settling in fourth place, she went to the front 400 metres from the finish and looked the likely winner, but was run down in the final strides by Waldgeist and beaten into second place. After the race, Dettori said "The ground was very sticky... She just folded a bit and the winner was too good for me today, but my filly was already tired... I think ground had a lot to do with it."

On 12 November, Enable was named Horse of the Year and Champion Older Horse at the Cartier Awards, taking both honours for the second time. These were her fourth and fifth awards, tying the record set by Frankel. In the 2019 World's Best Racehorse Rankings, Enable was given a rating of 128, placing her in a three-way tie for first place alongside Crystal Ocean and Waldgeist.

=== 2020: six-year-old season ===
Enable's first start of 2020 was the Eclipse Stakes at Sandown Park on 5 July. Owing to the restructuring of the British flat racing because of the COVID-19 pandemic, the race was not open to three-year-olds for the first time in its history. In her attempt to win the race for a second time, Enable started favourite ahead of Ghaiyyath and Japan, despite Gosden warning that she was likely to be in need of the race and short of peak fitness. After racing in mid-division, she stayed on well in the straight but was unable to reel in the front-running Ghaiyyath and finished second, beaten two and a quarter lengths. Gosden was satisfied with the run, commenting "We're delighted with that, she ran a gorgeous race... She enjoyed it and the zest and desire was there, but trying to get involved with a front-running horse like [Ghaiyyath] was never going to be her deal... It was the perfect platform she needed for the King George".

When Enable attempted to record an unprecedented third victory in the King George VI and Queen Elizabeth Stakes on 25 July, only two horses appeared to oppose her: Japan and the 2019 Irish Derby winner Sovereign. Enable went off the 4/9 favourite in a race run behind closed doors in heavy rain. She settled in second place behind Sovereign before moving up to take the lead in the straight and drew away in the final furlong to win "easily" by five and a half lengths. Frankie Dettori, who was winning the race for a record-equalling seventh time said "We tried a variety of things to get the fire back, and that's why John Gosden is a great trainer, he does things outside the box, and we got her back. She's not getting better, but her enthusiasm throughout the race today was plain to see and she's thriving with racing... I love her so much. I've become friends with her, she's got tremendous presence and she knows she's good".

Enable's connections took her to Kempton to attempt a second September Stakes win instead of going to the Yorkshire Oaks or the Juddmonte International. After missing the start, Dettori raced Enable into a lead that she maintained for the rest of the race. She pulled away from Kirstenbosch and the previous year's Melbourne Cup runner up, Prince of Arran, to win by 7 lengths at a starting price of 1-14.

Her next start was the Prix de l'Arc de Triomphe, where she was the 5/4 favourite trying for a record third win in Europe's arguably most prestigious race. But she came sixth in the eleven horse field in heavy going.

In the 2020 World's Best Racehorse Rankings, Enable was rated on 122, making her the equal twenty-first best racehorse in the world.

== Retirement and breeding career ==
Juddmonte announced Enable's retirement on 12 October 2020. Khalid Abdullah's racing manager, Teddy Beckett, said that Enable had "brought so much joy to everyone who has been involved with her" and John Gosden stated "Enable has retired happy and sound after an extraordinary career. Her daily presence has been a joy and her record in Group Ones including four Oaks, three King Georges, two Arcs, an Eclipse and a Breeders' Cup Turf is a marvel and unprecedented." Frankie Dettori also paid his tribute, saying "Obviously I shed a tear as I was a bit emotional. She has touched my heart and has been one of the great mares of our generation."

Enable was retired to stud and her first foal, a colt by Kingman, was born on 11 February 2022. Encompass never raced and was sent to Cyprus to stand at stud. Her second foal, a chestnut filly by Dubawi, was born in March 2023. Envisage had not raced by October 2026. Her third foal, Entrust, a colt by Dubawi, made a winning racecourse debut in October 2026.

== Race record ==
Date	Race name	D(f)	Course	Class	Prize (£K)	Odds	Runners	Place	Margin	Runner-up	Time	Jockey	Trainer
28 November 2016	Maiden Stakes	8	Newcastle	5	3	7/2	9	1	3.75	Gallifrey	1:38.52	Robert Havlin	John Gosden
21 April 2017	Conditions Stakes	10	Newbury	3	10	5/1	6	3			2:07.34	William Buick	John Gosden
10 May 2017	Cheshire Oaks	11	Chester	1 (L)	34	2/1	7	1	1.75	Alluringly	2:23.80	Frankie Dettori	John Gosden
2 June 2017	Epsom Oaks	12	Epsom	1 (G1)	284	6/1	9	1	5	Rhododendron	2:34.13	Frankie Dettori	John Gosden
15 July 2017	Irish Oaks	12	Curragh	1 (G1)	198	2/5 F	10	1	5.5	Rain Goddess	2:32.13	Frankie Dettori	John Gosden
29 July 2017	King George VI and Queen Elizabeth Stakes	12	Ascot	1 (G1)	652	5/4 F	10	1	4.5	Ulysses	2:36.22	Frankie Dettori	John Gosden
24 August 2017	Yorkshire Oaks	12	York	1 (G1)	198	1/4 F	6	1	5	Coronet	2:35.79	Frankie Dettori	John Gosden
1 October 2017	Prix de l'Arc de Triomphe	12	Chantilly	1 (G1)	2442	10/11 F	18	1	2.5	Cloth of Stars	2:28.69	Frankie Dettori	John Gosden
8 September 2018	September Stakes	12	Kempton Park	1 (G3)	40	8/15 F	4	1	3.5	Crystal Ocean	2:30.57	Frankie Dettori	John Gosden
7 October 2018	Prix de l'Arc de Triomphe	12	Longchamp	1 (G1)	2528	Evs F	19	1	snk	Sea of Class	2:29.24	Frankie Dettori	John Gosden
3 November 2018	Breeders' Cup Turf	12	Churchill Downs	1 (G1)	1630	8/13 F	13	1	0.75	Magical	2:32.65	Frankie Dettori	John Gosden
6 July 2019	Eclipse Stakes	10	Sandown Park	1 (G1)	425	4/6 F	8	1	0.75	Magical	2:04.77	Frankie Dettori	John Gosden
27 July 2019	King George VI and Queen Elizabeth Stakes	12	Ascot	1 (G1)	708	8/15 F	11	1	0.25	Crystal Ocean	2:32.42	Frankie Dettori	John Gosden
22 August 2019	Yorkshire Oaks	12	York	1 (G1)	241	1/4 F	4	1	2.75	Magical	2:29.90	Frankie Dettori	John Gosden
6 October 2019	Prix de l'Arc de Triomphe	12	Longchamp	1 (G1)	2573	1/2 F	12	2			2:31.97	Frankie Dettori	John Gosden
5 July 2020	Eclipse Stakes	10	Sandown Park	1 (G1)	141	Evs F	7	2			2:04.48	Frankie Dettori	John Gosden
25 July 2020	King George VI and Queen Elizabeth Stakes	12	Ascot	1 (G1)	226	4/9 F	3	1	5.5	Sovereign	2:28.92	Frankie Dettori	John Gosden
5 September 2020	September Stakes	12	Kempton Park	1 (G3)	31	1/14 F	6	1	7	Kirstenbosch	2:30.33	Frankie Dettori	John Gosden
4 October 2020	Prix de l'Arc de Triomphe	12	Longchamp	1 (G1)	1452	9/10 F	12	6			2:39.30	Frankie Dettori	John Gosden

== Pedigree ==
Pedigree of Enable (GB), bay filly, 2014
Sire Nathaniel (IRE) 2008	Galileo (IRE); 1998	Sadler's Wells	Northern Dancer
Sire Nathaniel (IRE) 2008	Galileo (IRE); 1998	Sadler's Wells	Fairy Bridge
Sire Nathaniel (IRE) 2008	Galileo (IRE); 1998	Urban Sea	Miswaki
Sire Nathaniel (IRE) 2008	Galileo (IRE); 1998	Urban Sea	Allegretta
Sire Nathaniel (IRE) 2008	Magnificient Style (USA); 1993	Silver Hawk	Roberto
Sire Nathaniel (IRE) 2008	Magnificient Style (USA); 1993	Silver Hawk	Gris Vitesse
Sire Nathaniel (IRE) 2008	Magnificient Style (USA); 1993	Mia Karina	Icecapade
Sire Nathaniel (IRE) 2008	Magnificient Style (USA); 1993	Mia Karina	Basin
Dam Concentric (GB) 2004	Sadler's Wells (USA); 1981	Northern Dancer	Nearctic
Dam Concentric (GB) 2004	Sadler's Wells (USA); 1981	Northern Dancer	Natalma
Dam Concentric (GB) 2004	Sadler's Wells (USA); 1981	Fairy Bridge	Bold Reason
Dam Concentric (GB) 2004	Sadler's Wells (USA); 1981	Fairy Bridge	Special
Dam Concentric (GB) 2004	Apogee (GB); 1990	Shirley Heights	Mill Reef
Dam Concentric (GB) 2004	Apogee (GB); 1990	Shirley Heights	Hardiemma
Dam Concentric (GB) 2004	Apogee (GB); 1990	Bourbon Girl	Ile de Bourbon
Dam Concentric (GB) 2004	Apogee (GB); 1990	Bourbon Girl	Fleet Girl (Family: 4-m)

- Enable is inbred 3x2 to Sadler's Wells, meaning that this stallion appears in both the second and third generations of her pedigree.
- Enable is inbred 4x3 to Northern Dancer, meaning that this stallion appears in both the third and fourth generations of her pedigree.
