= 2018 Prix de l'Arc de Triomphe =

97th running of the Prix de l'Arc de Triomphe horse race

97th Prix de l'Arc de Triomphe
- Prix de l'Arc de Triomphe
- Location: Longchamp Racecourse
- Date: 7 October 2018
- Winning horse: Enable
- Jockey: Frankie Dettori
- Trainer: John Gosden (GB)

The 2018 Prix de l'Arc de Triomphe was a horse race which was held at Longchamp on Sunday 7 October 2018. The race was run at Longchamp Racecourse for the first time since 2015, having been staged at Chantilly Racecourse in 2016 and 2017 while Longchamp was closed for major redevelopment. It was the 97th running of the Prix de l'Arc de Triomphe.

== Full result ==
Pos.	Marg.	Horse	Age	Jockey	Trainer (Country)
1		Enable	4	Frankie Dettori	John Gosden (GB)
2	snk	Sea of Class	3	James Doyle	William Haggas (GB)
3	¾	Cloth of Stars	5	Vincent Cheminaud	André Fabre (FR)
4	¾	Waldgeist	4	Pierre-Charles Boudot	André Fabre (FR)
5	1½	Capri	4	Donnacha O'Brien	Aidan O'Brien (IRE)
6	½	Salouen	4	Oisin Murphy	Sylvester Kirk (GB)
7	nk	Kew Gardens	3	Ryan Moore	Aidan O'Brien (IRE)
8	nk	Nelson	3	Michael Hussey	Aidan O'Brien (IRE)
9	snk	Study of Man	3	Stéphane Pasquier	Pascal Bary (FR)
10	¾	Magical	3	Wayne Lordan	Aidan O'Brien (IRE)
11	½	Way to Paris	5	Gerald Mosse	Antonio Marcialis (ITA)
12	¾	Tiberian	6	William Buick	Alain Couteil (FR)
13	4½	Talismanic	5	Mickael Barzalona	André Fabre (FR)
14	snk	Patascoy	3	Olivier Peslier	Xavier Thomas-Demeaulte (FR)
15	½	Defoe	4	Andrea Atzeni	Roger Varian (GB)
16	4½	Hunting Horn	3	Seamie Heffernan	Aidan O'Brien (IRE)
17	2	Clincher	4	Yutaka Take	Hiroshi Miyamoto (JPN)
18	3½	Neufbosc	3	Cristian Demuro	Pia Brandt (FR)
19	dist	Louis D'Or	3	Antoine Hamelin	Tony Castanheira (FR)

- Abbreviations: snk = short neck; nk = neck, dist = distance
