= 2016 Prix de l'Arc de Triomphe =

- Location: Chantilly Racecourse
- Date: October 2, 2016
- Winning horse: Found

The 2016 Prix de l'Arc de Triomphe was a horse race held at Chantilly on Sunday 2 October 2016. The race could not take place at its usual venue at Longchamp Racecourse as that course was closed in 2016 for major redevelopment. It was the 95th running of the Prix de l'Arc de Triomphe. The race was won by Michael Tabor, Derrick Smith & Sue Magnier's four-year-old filly Found, trained in Ireland by Aidan O'Brien and ridden by Ryan Moore. Moore had previously won the race on Workforce whilst O'Brien was also recording his second success, having trained Dylan Thomas.

== The contenders ==
The five-year-old British-trained horse Postponed was regarded as the most likely winner after six consecutive wins including the King George VI and Queen Elizabeth Stakes, Dubai Sheema Classic, Coronation Cup and International Stakes. The only other British runner was The Grey Gatsby who had been an outstanding three-year-old in 2014 (winning the Prix du Jockey Club and the Irish Champion Stakes) but had not won for over two years. Japan was represented by Makahiki, a three-year-old colt whose wins included the Tokyo Yushun in Japan before taking the Prix Niel on his most recent start. The best of the Irish runners appeared to be Harzand who had won the Epsom Derby and the Irish Derby but who was recovering from an injury incurred in the Irish Champion Stakes. The remainder of the Irish consisted of three four-year-olds from the Aidan O'Brien stable, all of whom had been sired by Galileo: Found was a filly who had won the Breeders' Cup Turf but finished second in her last five races; Order of St George was a stayer who had won the Irish St Leger and the Ascot Gold Cup, whilst Highland Reel was a seasoned international campaigner whose wins included the Hong Kong Vase and the King George VI and Queen Elizabeth Stakes. The best-fancied of the French-trained runners were the 2015 Prix du Jockey Club winner New Bay, the three-year-old filly Left Hand who had won the Prix Vermeille over the same course and distance in September and Silverwave, the winner of the Grand Prix de Saint-Cloud and the Prix Foy. The other six runners were Talismanic (winner of two Listed races), Savoir Vivre (Grand Prix de Deauville), Siljan's Saga (Grand Prix de Deauville), Vedevani (acting as a pacemaker for New Bay), Migwar, and One Foot In Heaven (Grand Prix de Chantilly).

Postponed was made the 2/1 favourite ahead of Makahiki on 3.9/1 and Harzand on 6.5/1. New Bay (9/1) and Found (9.6/1) were next in the betting ahead of Left Hand (13/1), Order of St George (14/1) and Silverwave (16/1).

== The race ==
Vedevani took the lead soon after the starts and set a strong pace with Order of St George, Highland Reel Postponed and The Grey Gatsby. Harzand, Found, Left Hand, Silverwave and Makahiki raced in mid-division whilst New Bay was restrained towards the rear of the field. Vedevani maintained his advantage into the straight but was overtaken by Found 400 metres from the finish. The Irish filly quickly opened up a clear advantage and won decisively from her stablemates Highland Reel and Order of St George. Siljan's Saga finished strongly from the rear of the field to take fourth ahead of Postponed.

== Full result ==
Pos.	Marg.	Horse	Age	Jockey	Trainer (Country)
1		Found	4	Ryan Moore	Aidan O'Brien (IRE)
2	1¾	Highland Reel	4	Seamie Heffernan	Aidan O'Brien (IRE)
3	1½	Order of St George	4	Frankie Dettori	Aidan O'Brien (IRE)
4	¾	Siljan's Saga	6	Pierre-Charles Boudot	Jean-Pierre Gauvin (FR)
5	2½	Postponed	5	Andrea Atzeni	Roger Varian (GB)
6	nse	One Foot In Heaven	4	Cristian Demuro	Alain de Royer-Dupré (FR)
7	snk	New Bay	4	Vincent Cheminaud	André Fabre (FR)
8	1½	Savoir Vivre	3	Frederik Tylicki	Jean-Pierre Carvalho (FR)
9	1½	Harzand	3	Pat Smullen	Dermot Weld (IRE)
10	2	Vedevani	3	Alexis Badel	Alain de Royer-Dupré (FR)
11	7	Talismanic	3	Mickael Barzalona	André Fabre (FR)
12	1	Left Hand	3	Maxime Guyon	Carlos Laffon-Parias (FR)
13	¾	Silverwave	4	Christophe Soumillon	Pascal Bary (FR)
14	3	Makahiki	3	Christophe Lemaire	Yasuo Tomomichi (JPN)
15	1¼	Migwar	4	Olivier Peslier	Freddy Head (FR)
16	1¼	The Grey Gatsby	5	James Doyle	Kevin Ryan (GB)

- Abbreviations: ns = nose; shd = short-head; hd = head; snk = short neck; nk = neck

== Race details ==
- Sponsor: Qatar Racing and Equestrian Club
- Purse:5.000.000 €
- Going: Good
- Distance: 2,400 metres
- Number of runners: 16
- Winner's time: 2:23.61
