= Glasgow Stakes =

- Class: Listed
- Location: Hamilton Park; Hamilton, Scotland
- Race type: Flat / Thoroughbred
- Sponsor: British Stallion Studs
- Website: Hamilton Park

Race information
- Distance: 1m 3f 15y (2,227 m)
- Surface: Turf
- Track: Right-handed
- Qualification: Three-year-olds excluding G1 / G2 winners
- Weight: 9 st 7 lb Allowances; 5 lb for fillies Penalties; 5 lb for Group 3 winners * 3 lb for Listed winners * * after 2024
- Purse: £55,000 (2025); 1st: £31,191

Glasgow Stakes
2026
Superior Choice	Prizeland	Plaid

Previous years
2025
Nahraan	Arabian Force	Tiernan
2024
Kalpana	God's Window	Caviar Heights
2023
Chesspiece	Sea Of Roses	Circle of Fire
2022
West Wind Blows	Groundbreaker	Zain Sarinda
2021
Aleas	Title	Glenartney

2020-2011
2020
Subjectivist	Tritonic	Tulip Fields
2019
Sameem	Persian Moon	Aspire Tower
2018
Raymond Tusk	Austrian School	Shailene
2017
Defoe	Frankuus	Call To Mind
2016
Ventura Storm	Ormito	Montsarrat
2015
Medrano	Prince Gagarin	Red Tornado
2014
Postponed	Double Bluff	Impulsive Moment
2013
Maputo	Alta Lilea	Mister Impatience
2012
Sparkling Portrait	Goldoni	Albamara
2011
Hunter's Light	Malthouse	Albaraka

2010-2001
2010
Corsica	Admission	Take It To The Max
2009
Parthenon	Stately Home	Holberg
2008
Captain Webb	Love Galore	Bold Choice
2007
Boscobel	Dansant	Western Adventure
2006
Tam Lin	Futun	Genari
2004
Day Flight	Mac Regal	Go For Gold
2003
Lateen Sails	Illustrator	Rocket Force
2002
Imtiyaz	L'Oiseau D'Argent	Nysaean
2001
Musha Merr	Potemkin	Londoner

2000-1991
2000
Hataab	Sandmason	Fast Track
1999
Zaajer	Mukhalif	Deal Fair
1998
Greek Dance	Capri	Fruits Of Love
1997
Symonds Inn	Shaya	Greek Palace
1996
Dr Massini	King Alex	Astor Place
1995
Tamure	Minds Music	Sonic Boy
1994
Foyer	Overbury	Darnay
1993
Commander In Chief	Needle Gun	Norfolk Hero
1992
Polish Blue	Binkhaldoun	Tony San
1991
Cruachan	Saddlers' Hall	Close Friend

1990-1988
1990
Sasaki	Waathig	Kasayid
1989
Monsagem	Konigsberg	Just My Bill
1988
Atlaal	National Service	Spring Creek Road

The Glasgow Stakes is a Listed flat horse race in Great Britain open to three-year-old horses. It is run at Hamilton Park over a distance of 1 mile, 3 furlongs and 15 yards (2,227 metres), and it is scheduled to take place each year in July.

== History ==
The event was formerly contested at York over 1 mile, 2 furlongs and 88 yards. It used to be held in May, and it sometimes served as a trial for the Epsom Derby. Both races were won by Commander in Chief in 1993.

The Glasgow Stakes was given Listed status in 1999. For a period it was restricted to colts and geldings. It was last run at York in 2004.

The race was transferred to Hamilton Park, several miles to the south-east of Glasgow, in 2006. It was reopened to fillies and switched to mid-July in 2011.

== Records ==
Leading jockey (5 wins):

- Pat Eddery – Illustrious Prince (1976), New Berry (1979), Pelerin (1980), Polish Blue (1992), Commander in Chief (1993)

Leading trainer (7 wins):

- Sir Michael Stoute – Hill's Yankee (1978), Sasaki (1990), Polish Blue (1992), Foyer (1994), Dr Massini (1996), Greek Dance (1998), Tam Lin (2006)

== Winners ==
Year	Winner	Jockey	Trainer	Time
1976	Illustrious Prince	Pat Eddery	Peter Walwyn	2:19.60
1977	Gregarious	Willie Carson	Dick Hern	2:17.70
1978	Hill's Yankee	Greville Starkey	Michael Stoute	2:11.27
1979	New Berry	Pat Eddery	Peter Walwyn	2:12.80
1980	Pelerin	Pat Eddery	Harry Wragg	2:10.16
1981	Amyndas	Geoff Baxter	Bruce Hobbs	2:19.14
1982	Corked	Geoff Baxter	Bruce Hobbs	2:13.19
1983	Gay Lemur	Geoff Baxter	Bruce Hobbs	2:19.62
1984	Chaumiere	Tony Ives	Robert Williams	2:10.98
1985	Line of Fire	Geoff Baxter	Bruce Hobbs	2:19.72
1986	Kadial	Steve Cauthen	Fulke Johnson Houghton	2:14.31
1987	Pillar of Wisdom	Steve Cauthen	Olivier Douieb	2:14.47
1988	Atlaal	Steve Cauthen	Henry Cecil	2:14.49
1989	Monsagem	Steve Cauthen	Henry Cecil	2:09.82
1990	Sasaki	Walter Swinburn	Michael Stoute	2:13.48
1991	Cruachan	Ray Cochrane	Guy Harwood	2:15.03
1992	Polish Blue	Pat Eddery	Michael Stoute	2:09.81
1993	Commander in Chief	Pat Eddery	Henry Cecil	2:13.57
1994	Foyer	Walter Swinburn	Michael Stoute	2:08.52
1995	Tamure	Frankie Dettori	John Gosden	2:11.58
1996	Dr Massini	Michael Kinane	Michael Stoute	2:09.39
1997	Symonds Inn	Kieren Fallon	Jimmy FitzGerald	2:16.02
1998	Greek Dance	Walter Swinburn	Sir Michael Stoute	2:12.11
1999	Zaajer	Richard Hills	Ed Dunlop	2:16.38
2000	Hataab	Richard Hills	Ed Dunlop	2:10.14
2001	Musha Merr	Frankie Dettori	Saeed bin Suroor	2:12.59
2002	Imtiyaz	Richard Hills	Saeed bin Suroor	2:08.34
2003	Lateen Sails	Frankie Dettori	Saeed bin Suroor	2:09.79
2004	Day Flight	Richard Hughes	John Gosden	2:15.39
2005	no race
2006	Tam Lin	Robert Winston	Sir Michael Stoute	2:28.04
2007	Boscobel	Joe Fanning	Mark Johnston	2:25.77
2008	Captain Webb	Greg Fairley	Mark Johnston	2:19.32
2009	Parthenon	Greg Fairley	Mark Johnston	2:22.07
2010	Corsica	Joe Fanning	Mark Johnston	2:24.77
2011	Hunter's Light	Phillip Makin	Saeed bin Suroor	2:21.67
2012	Sparkling Portrait	Paul Hanagan	Richard Fahey	2:32.01
2013	Maputo	Joe Fanning	Mark Johnston	2:20.01
2014	Postponed	Andrea Atzeni	Luca Cumani	2:18.66
2015	Medrano	Fergal Lynch	David Brown	2:28.98
2016	Ventura Storm	Sean Levey	Richard Hannon Jr.	2:26.98
2017	Defoe	Harry Bentley	Roger Varian	2:19.17
2018	Raymond Tusk	Phillip Makin	Richard Hannon Jr.	2:19.30
2019	Sameem	David Allan	James Tate	2:25.92
2020	Subjectivist	Joe Fanning	Mark Johnston	2:21.87
2021	Aleas	Daniel Tudhope	Ralph Beckett	2:24.42
2022	West Wind Blows	Ben Curtis	Simon & Ed Crisford	2:17.60
2023	Chesspiece	James Doyle	Simon & Ed Crisford	2:22.21
2024	Kalpana	P. J. McDonald	Andrew Balding	2:19.84
2025	Nahraan	Oisin Murphy	John & Thady Gosden	2:21.43
2026	Superior Choice	Shane Foley	John & Thady Gosden	2:21.20

== See also ==
- Horse racing in Great Britain
- List of British flat horse races
