= Study of Man =

Irish-bred racehorse

- Sire: Deep Impact
- Grandsire: Sunday Silence
- Dam: Second Happiness
- Damsire: Storm Cat
- Sex: Stallion
- Foaled: 9 April 2015
- Country: Ireland
- Colour: Bay
- Breeder: Flaxman Stables
- Owner: Flaxman Stables
- Trainer: Pascal Bary
- Record: 11: 3-3-2
- Earnings: £1,033,142

Major wins
- Prix Greffulhe (2018); Prix du Jockey Club (2018)

Study of Man (foaled 9 April 2015) is an Irish-bred, French-trained retired Thoroughbred racehorse and active breeding stallion. After winning his only race as a juvenile in 2017 he developed into a top-class performer in the following spring, finishing second in the Prix La Force and winning the Prix Greffulhe before recording his biggest victory in the Prix du Jockey Club. He never won again but ran second in both the Prix Ganay and Prix d'Ispahan as a four-year-old in 2019.

== Background ==
Study of Man is a bay horse with a small white star, bred in Ireland by his owners Flaxman Stables, a company set up to manage the racing interests of the Niarchos family. He was sent into training with Pascal Bary at Chantilly and was ridden in all of his races by Stéphane Pasquier.

He was from the eighth crop of foals sired by Deep Impact, who was the Japanese Horse of the Year in 2005 and 2006, winning races including the Tokyo Yushun, Tenno Sho, Arima Kinen and Japan Cup. Deep Impact's other progeny include Gentildonna, Harp Star, Kizuna, A Shin Hikari, Marialite and Saxon Warrior. Study of Man's dam Second Happiness finished unplaced on her only start but was a daughter of the outstanding racehorse and broodmare Miesque.

== Racing career ==
=== 2017: two-year-old season ===
Study of Man made his first and only appearance as a two-year-old in a maiden race over 1600 metres on heavy ground at Saint-Cloud Racecourse on 21 September. Starting at odds of 4.4/1 in a twelve-runner field he started slowly but took the lead 300 metres from the finish and won "cosily" by two lengths from the Freddy Head-trained favourite Near Gold.

=== 2018: three-year-old season ===
For his three-year-old debut, Study of Man was stepped up in class and started favourite for the Group 3 Prix La Force over 1800 metres at Longchamp Racecourse on 10 April. After being restrained at the rear of the nine-runner field, he made steady progress in the straight to take second place, one and a quarter lengths behind the British-trained winner Chilean. The Group 2 Prix Greffulhe over 2100 metres at Saint-Cloud Racecourse four weeks later saw the colt start 1.1/1 favourite ahead of three rivals: Alhadab (runner-up in the Prix Noailles), Alounak (a Listed winner in Germany) and Assiro. Study of Man took an early lead before settling in second place behind Assiro. He regained the advantage 400 metres from the finish and drew away in the closing stages to win "readily" by three and a half lengths. The Niarchos family's racing manager Alan Cooper commented "Pascal Bary told me over the phone recently that Study of Man possesses a similar turn of foot to his grand-dam, Miesque, which gives us great encouragement. Stéphane Pasquier gave him a proper race because this is only his third start and, if we were going to go on to a major Group 1 next, he needed experience. I think he'll have learned from today".

On 3 June at Chantilly Study of Man started the 4/1 second favourite behind the Poule d'Essai des Poulains winner Olmedo in the Group 1 Prix du Jockey Club. The other fourteen runners included Key Victory (Newmarket Stakes), Rostropovich (Futurity Stakes, Dee Stakes), Dice Roll (Prix Djebel), Hey Gaman (Washington Singer Stakes) and Intellogent (Prix de Guiche). After settling in mid-division the colt moved up to join the leaders in the straight, took a narrow lead 200 metres out and kept on well to win by half a length from the outsider Patascay, with Louis d'Or and Intellogent close behind in third and fourth. After the race Pascal Bary said "Ever since he arrived in the yard, he's been a fantastic horse because he understands everything. He does everything well... To train him is a dream. The horse has more of a miler's pedigree than for a mile and a half, and if we're going to go up to that trip, we had to do it progressively. He's a young horse who'd run only three times, and so you mustn't ask the impossible straight away."

After a break of over two months, Study of Man returned in the Group 2 Prix Guillaume d'Ornano over 2000 metres at Deauville Racecourse on 15 August. He started the 4/5 favourite but never looked likely to win as he came home third behind Knight To Behold and Patascay, beaten six lengths by the winner. One month later the colt started at odds of 8/1 for the Irish Champion Stakes at Leopardstown Racecourse in which he finished fifth of the seven runners behind Roaring Lion. Study of Man ended his season in the Prix de l'Arc de Triomphe over 2400 metres at Longchamp on 7 October and started a 40/1 outsider in a nineteen-runner field. After racing in mid-division he made some progress in the straight but faded in the last 200 metres and came home ninth, four and a half lengths behind the winner Enable.

In the 2018 World's Best Racehorse Rankings Study of Man was given a rating of 115, making him the 221st best racehorse in the world.

=== 2019: four-year-old season ===
Study of Man began his third campaign in the Prix Ganay over 2100 metres at Longchamp on 28 April in which he ran second to Waldgeist with Ghaiyyath, Soleil Marin (Prix Exbury) and Intellogent finishing behind. At the same track on 26 May the colt went off at odds of 4/1 for the 1800 metre Prix d'Ispahan in a nine-runner field. After being restrained in the early stages he kept on well in the straight to take second place, three quarters of a length behind the winner Zabeel Prince. In the Prix Messidor over 1600 metres at Deauville on 21 July, Study of Man started the 1.3/1 favourite but was outpaced in the closing stages and finished third behind Impulsif and Trais Fluors. At the same track three weeks later the colt started second favourite for the Prix Jacques Le Marois but never looked likely to win and came home sixth of the eight runners behind Romanised.

In the 2019 World's Best Racehorse Rankings Study of Man was given a rating of 115, making him the 201st best racehorse in the world.

== Stud record ==
At the end of his racing career Study of Man was retired to become a breeding stallion at the Lanwades Stud in Newmarket, Suffolk.

=== Notable progeny ===
c = colt, f = filly, g = gelding

Foaled	Name	Sex	Major wins
2021	Kalpana	f	British Champions Fillies and Mares Stakes (twice), King George VI and Queen Elizabeth Stakes, Yorkshire Oaks

== Pedigree ==
Pedigree of Study of Man (IRE), bay stallion, 2015
Sire Deep Impact (JPN) 2002	Sunday Silence (USA); 1986	Halo	Hail to Reason
Sire Deep Impact (JPN) 2002	Sunday Silence (USA); 1986	Halo	Cosmah
Sire Deep Impact (JPN) 2002	Sunday Silence (USA); 1986	Wishing Well	Understanding
Sire Deep Impact (JPN) 2002	Sunday Silence (USA); 1986	Wishing Well	Mountain Flower
Sire Deep Impact (JPN) 2002	Wind in Her Hair (IRE); 1991	Alzao (USA)	Lyphard
Sire Deep Impact (JPN) 2002	Wind in Her Hair (IRE); 1991	Alzao (USA)	Lady Rebecca (GB)
Sire Deep Impact (JPN) 2002	Wind in Her Hair (IRE); 1991	Burghclere (GB)	Busted
Sire Deep Impact (JPN) 2002	Wind in Her Hair (IRE); 1991	Burghclere (GB)	Highclere
Dam Second Happiness (USA) 2002	Storm Cat (USA); 1983	Storm Bird (CAN)	Northern Dancer
Dam Second Happiness (USA) 2002	Storm Cat (USA); 1983	Storm Bird (CAN)	South Ocean
Dam Second Happiness (USA) 2002	Storm Cat (USA); 1983	Terlingua	Secretariat
Dam Second Happiness (USA) 2002	Storm Cat (USA); 1983	Terlingua	Crimson Saint
Dam Second Happiness (USA) 2002	Miesque (USA); 1984	Nureyev	Northern Dancer (CAN)
Dam Second Happiness (USA) 2002	Miesque (USA); 1984	Nureyev	Special
Dam Second Happiness (USA) 2002	Miesque (USA); 1984	Pasadoble	Prove Out
Dam Second Happiness (USA) 2002	Miesque (USA); 1984	Pasadoble	Santa Quilla (FR) (Family: 20)

- Through his dam, Study of Man was inbred 4 × 4 to Northern Dancer, meaning that this stallion appears twice in the fourth generation of his pedigree.
