= Kalpana (horse) =

British bred Thoroughbred racehorse

- Racing Silk of Juddmonte
- Sire: Study of Man
- Grandsire: Deep Impact
- Dam: Zero Gravity
- Damsire: Dansili
- Sex: Mare
- Foaled: 29 April 2021 (age 5)
- Country: United Kingdom
- Colour: Bay
- Breeder: Juddmonte Farm
- Owner: Juddmonte
- Trainer: Andrew Balding
- Record: 20: 9-6-2
- Earnings: £2,861,364

Major wins
- Glasgow Stakes (2024); September Stakes (2024); British Champions Fillies and Mares Stakes (2024, 2025); Aston Park Stakes (2026); King George VI & Queen Elizabeth Stakes (2026); Yorkshire Oaks (2026)
- Last updated on 18 October 2026

Kalpana (foaled 21 April 2021) is a retired British-bred thoroughbred racehorse known for winning the British Champions Fillies and Mares Stakes back to back and the King George VI & Queen Elizabeth Stakes.

== Background ==
Kalpana was bred by Juddmonte Farm. She was a homebred for Juddmonte, sired by Study Of Man out of Zero Gravity (by Dansili), and has been trained by Andrew Balding. She was the first crop of Study of Man as stallion.

== Racing career ==
=== 2024 : three-year-old season ===
On her three-year-old season, Kalpana ran 8 times, achieving 5 wins, 2 seconds, and 1 third. After winning her debut in Wolverhampton Racecourse, she then entered two more races, achieved 1 win and 1 second.

On 5 May, she entered the Listed Pretty Polly Stakes and finished second. She then entered Gr.2 race Ribblesdale Stakes on 20 June, finished third. Kalpana would win her three next races, the Listed race Glasgow Stakes on 19 July at Hamilton Park Racecourse, the Gr.3 September Stakes on 7 September at Kempton racecourse and her first Gr.1 win at Ascot Racecourse on 19 October in British Champions Fillies and Mares Stakes.

=== 2025 : four-year-old season ===
On her four-old-year, Kalpana started the season with a third place finish in the Gr.1 Tattersalls Gold Cup at the Curragh Racecourse. She then got second-place finishes 3-in-a row in the Gr.1 Pretty Polly Stakes at Curragh Racecourse on 28 June, Gr.1 King George VI and Queen Elizabeth Stakes at Ascot racecourse on 26 July and Gr.3 September Stakes on 6 September. She then taking the Prix de l'Arc de Triomphe on 5 October where she finished 7th.
On 18 October, Kalpana back to Ascot entered the Gr.1 British Champions Fillies and Mares Stakes, where she once again won the race, make it her 2nd Gr.1 win and achieved back to back British Champions Fillies and Mares Stakes winner.

=== 2026 : five-year-old season ===
She made the first start of her five-year-old season in the Gr.3 Aston Park Stakes at Newbury Racecourse on 16 May 2026. After gate opened, she settled in rear until 4 furlongs left, with 3 furlongs left she then moved from inside rail chasing West Wind Blows; she passed West Wind Blows with 2 furlongs left, then held her led and won the race.

== Racing statistics ==
The following racing form is based on information available on racingpost.com.

Date	Track	Race	Grade	Distance	Entry	Finish	Time (Note: Official time of winning horse. The time written in grey doesn't belong to Kalpana.)	Jockey	Winner (Runner-up)
2024 – three-year-old season
19 Jan	Wolverhampton	Novice Stakes	C5	1m 1/2f	7	1st	1:50.07	Hayley Turner	(Tatateo)
07 Mar	Newcastle	Novice Stakes	C4	1m	7	2nd	1:44.26	Hayley Turner	Inisherin
17 Apr	Newmarket	Price Promise Handicap	C3	1m2f	9	1st	2:03.19	Ryan Moore	Align The Stars
05 May	Newmarket	Pretty Polly Stakes	Listed	1m2f	8	2nd	2:03.22	Oisin Murphy	Friendly Soul
20 Jun	Ascot	Ribblesdale Stakes	G2	1m 3f 211 yards	12	3rd	2:29.04	Oisin Murphy	Port Fairy
19 Jul	Hamilton	Glasgow Stakes	Listed	1m3f	5	1st	2:19.84	P. J. McDonald	(God's Window)
07 Sep	Kempton	September Stakes	G3	1m4f	7	1st	2:33.34	P. J. McDonald	(Lion's Pride)
19 Oct	Ascot	British Champions Fillies and Mares Stakes	G1	1m 3f 211 yards	14	1st	2:29.57	William Buick	(Wingspan)
2025 – four-year-old season
25 May	Curragh	Tattersalls Gold Cup	G1	1m2 1/2f	9	3rd	2:08.41	Oisin Murphy	Los Angeles
28 Jun	Curragh	Pretty Polly Stakes	G1	1m2f	7	2nd	2:04.95	Colin Keane	Whirl
26 Jul	Ascot	King George VI and Queen Elizabeth Stakes	G1	1m 3f 211 yards	5	2nd	2:29.74	Oisin Murphy	Calandagan
06 Sep	Kempton	September Stakes	G3	1m4f	6	2nd	2:31.13	Colin Keane	Giavellotto
05 Oct	Longchamp	Prix de l'Arc de Triomphe	G1	2400 m	17	7th	2:29.17	Colin Keane	Daryz
18 Oct	Ascot	British Champions Fillies and Mares Stakes	G1	1m 3f 211 yards	10	1st	2:32.67	Colin Keane	(Estrange)
2026 – five-year-old season
16 May	Newbury	Aston Park Stakes	G3	1m4f	5	1st	2:28.71	Colin Keane	(West Wind Blows)
20 Jun	Ascot	Hardwicke Stakes	G2	1m 3f 211 yards	12	2nd	2:27.91	Colin Keane	Giavellotto
25 Jul	Ascot	King George VI and Queen Elizabeth Stakes	G1	1m 3f 211 yards	9	1st	2:27.73	Colin Keane	(Calandagan)
20 Aug	York	Yorkshire Oaks	G1	1m 3f 188 yards	9	1st	2:36.00	Colin Keane	(Sparan Nua)
04 Oct	Longchamp	Prix de l'Arc de Triomphe	G1	2400 m	16	5th	2:27.11	Colin Keane	Daryz
17 Oct	Ascot	British Champions Fillies and Mares Stakes	G1	1m 3f 211 yards	12	7th	2:29.49	Colin Keane	Minnie Hauk

== Pedigree ==
Pedigree of Kalpana (GB), bay mare, 2021
Sire Study of Man (IRE) 2015	Deep Impact (JPN); 2002	Sunday Silence (USA)	Halo
Sire Study of Man (IRE) 2015	Deep Impact (JPN); 2002	Sunday Silence (USA)	Wishing Well
Sire Study of Man (IRE) 2015	Deep Impact (JPN); 2002	Wind in Her Hair (IRE)	Alzao
Sire Study of Man (IRE) 2015	Deep Impact (JPN); 2002	Wind in Her Hair (IRE)	Burghclere
Sire Study of Man (IRE) 2015	Second Happiness (USA); 2002	Storm Cat (USA)	Storm Bird
Sire Study of Man (IRE) 2015	Second Happiness (USA); 2002	Storm Cat (USA)	Terlingua
Sire Study of Man (IRE) 2015	Second Happiness (USA); 2002	Miesque (USA)	Nureyev
Sire Study of Man (IRE) 2015	Second Happiness (USA); 2002	Miesque (USA)	Pasadoble
Dam Zero Gravity (GB) 2009	Dansili (GB); 1996	Danehill (USA)	Danzig
Dam Zero Gravity (GB) 2009	Dansili (GB); 1996	Danehill (USA)	Razyana
Dam Zero Gravity (GB) 2009	Dansili (GB); 1996	Hasili (IRE)	Kahyasi
Dam Zero Gravity (GB) 2009	Dansili (GB); 1996	Hasili (IRE)	Kerali
Dam Zero Gravity (GB) 2009	Imbabala (GB); 1995	Zafonic (USA)	Gone West
Dam Zero Gravity (GB) 2009	Imbabala (GB); 1995	Zafonic (USA)	Zaizafon
Dam Zero Gravity (GB) 2009	Imbabala (GB); 1995	Interval (IRE)	Habitat
Dam Zero Gravity (GB) 2009	Imbabala (GB); 1995	Interval (IRE)	Intermission

- Kalpana (GB) is inbred 5 × 5 × 5 to Northern Dancer, meaning that this stallion appears thrice in the fifth generation of her pedigree.
