= Defoe (horse) =

Irish-bred Thoroughbred racehorse

- Racing silks of Mohammed Obaid Al Maktoum
- Sire: Dalakhani
- Grandsire: Darshaan
- Dam: Dulkashe
- Damsire: Pivotal
- Sex: Gelding
- Foaled: 8 May 2014
- Country: Ireland
- Colour: Grey
- Breeder: Darley Stud
- Owner: Mohammed Obaid Al Maktoum
- Trainer: Roger Varian
- Record: 22: 9-5-2
- Earnings: £809,192

Major wins
- Glasgow Stakes (2017); Geoffrey Freer Stakes (2017); John Porter Stakes (2018); Jockey Club Stakes (2018); Coronation Cup (2019); Hardwicke Stakes (2019)

Defoe (8 May 2014 – 29 July 2020) was an Irish-bred, British-trained Thoroughbred racehorse. After winning one minor race as a juvenile he won four consecutive races in the following year including the Glasgow Stakes and Geoffrey Freer Stakes. In 2018 he won the John Porter Stakes and Jockey Club Stakes but was gelded at the end of the year. As a five-year-old he recorded his first Group 1 victory when he took the Coronation Cup and followed up by winning the Hardwicke Stakes. He remained in training in 2020 but suffered a fatal injury in July of that year.

== Background ==
Defoe was a grey gelding bred in Ireland by Sheikh Mohammed's Darley Stud. He entered the ownership of Mohammed Obaid Al Maktoum and was sent into training with Roger Varian at Newmarket, Suffolk. He has been ridden in most of his races by Andrea Atzeni.

His sire Dalakhani (from whom he inherited his grey coat) was named Cartier Horse of the Year in 2003 after wins in the Prix Lupin, Prix du Jockey Club and Prix de l'Arc de Triomphe. As a breeding stallion his other offspring have included Conduit, Duncan, Integral and Reliable Man. Defoe's dam Dulkashe showed very modest racing ability, winning one minor handicap from seven starts. She was a female-line descendant of the British broodmare Radiopye (foaled 1954) whose other descendants have included Scottish Rifle and Winter.

== Racing career ==
=== 2016: two-year-old season ===
On his racecourse debut, Defoe started the 3/10 favourite for a four-runner maiden race over one mile on soft ground at Ffos Las Racecourse on 11 September and won by a head from the filly Bianca Minola. Two weeks later at Epsom Racecourse he finished second of the five runners in a minor race, beaten one and three quarter lengths by the Paul Cole-trained Medieval. On his final run of the year he was stepped up in class and distance for the Listed Zetland Stakes over ten furlongs at Newmarket Racecourse but ran very poorly and came home eleventh of the twelve runners, more than twenty-six lengths behind the winner Coronet.

=== 2017: three-year-old season ===
Defoe began his second season in the London Gold Cup, a handicap race over ten furlong at Newbury Racecourse on 20 May in which he was assigned a weight of 126 pounds. Starting at odds of 8/1 he took the lead inside the final furlong and won by a length and a quarter from the favourite Fearless Fire. On 1 July he started favourite for a similar event at York Racecourse and won from eleven opponents carrying 133 pounds. Less than three weeks later the colt was promoted in class for the Listed Glasgow Stakes over eleven furlongs at Hamilton Park Racecourse and started 5/4 favourite ahead of Call To Mind (March Stakes) and Frankuus (Prix de Condé). Ridden as on his previous start by Harry Bentley he tracked the leaders before taking the lead in the final furlong and winning by one and a half lengths from Frankuus. Defoe was then moved up in class and distance again and matched against older horses for the first time when he started 13/8 favourite for the Group 3 Geoffrey Freer Stakes over thirteen and a half furlongs at Newbury in August. With Atzeni in the saddle he went to the front approaching the final furlong and won a "shade cosily" by three quarters of a length from the four-year-old Wall of Fire. In the 241st running of the St Leger over fourteen and a half furlongs at Doncaster Racecourse on 16 September Defoe started the 6/1 fourth choice in the betting but failed to reproduce his best form and finished eleventh in a race which saw Capri win from Crystal Ocean, Stradivarius and Rekindling.

=== 2018: four-year-old season ===
On 21 April 2018 Defoe began his third campaign in the Group 3 John Porter Stakes and started the 5/4 favourite ahead of Call To Mind and four others. After being restrained by Atzeni towards the rear of the field in the early stages he took the lead a furlong out and drew away in the closing stages to win by two and a half lengths from the Cumberland Lodge Stakes winner Danehill Kodiac. Two weeks later the colt started 1/2 favourite for the Group 2 Jockey Club Stakes at Newmarket and after tracking the leader Count Octave he went to the front inside the final furlong and won "comfortably" by three and a half lengths from Red Verdon. Atzeni commented "We don't know how good this fellow is, he keeps improving and could be anything". On 27 May he was sent to Ireland and started 5/4 favourite for the Tattersalls Gold Cup at the Curragh but never looked likely to win and came home third of the five runners behind Lancaster Bomber and Cliffs of Moher.

After a three-month break Defoe returned in autumn and was campaigned in continental Europe. On 2 September in Germany he started favourite for the Grosser Preis von Baden in which he produced a strong late run but failed by a neck to overhaul the Godolphin contender Best Solution. He then contested the Prix de l'Arc de Triomphe at Longchamp Racecourse on 7 October in which he started a 40/1 outsider and finished fifteenth of the nineteen runners behind Enable. On his final run of the season he returned to Germany and ran second behind Iquitos in the Grosser Preis von Bayern on 1 November.

Four weeks later Defoe was gelded. Varian commented "His owner decided to have him gelded and I am very much in agreement with his decision, as it should elongate his career and he is a fun horse to have around".

=== 2019: five-year-old season ===
As in 2018, Defoe began his season in the John Porter Stakes but he failed to repeat his success of the previous year as he came home fourth of the eight finishers behind Marmelo. He continued to follow his path of the previous year when he contested the Jockey Club Stakes and finished second, beaten one and a quarter lengths by the four-year-old colt Communique. On 31 May Defoe started the 11/1 in a nine-runner field for the Group 1 Coronation Cup over one and half miles at Epsom Racecourse. The filly Lah Ti Dar started favourite while the other runners included Kew Gardens, Old Persian, Marmelo, Marando (Ormonde Stakes) and Communique. Defoe started slowly and raced towards the rear of the field before making progress on the inside in the straight. Kew Gardens hit the front approaching the final furlong, but Defoe made a strong late run to gain the advantage in the closing stages and won by half a length with a gap of five lengths back to Salouen in third. After the race Varian said "It's fully deserved for the horse—you dream about results like that... He was slow away from the gates and didn't get the handy pitch we were looking for, but when the field fanned out on the straight, he found a gap... and he took it without flinching. Once he had a target, he always looked like he was going to get there".

At Royal Ascot on 22 June Defoe started the 11/4 favourite for the Hardwicke Stakes against seven opponent including Masar, Salouen, Communique, Marando and Mirage Dancer (Glorious Stakes). After racing in mid-division he took the lead in the straight and despite hanging to the right in the closing stages he won by half a length from the Czech-trained outsider Nagano Gold with Mirage Dancer a length away in third place. Varian commented "He is just a lovely horse. He is very straightforward, tries and relaxes and is getting better with age. He is a joy to train. ... We are excited for the rest of the season". Defoe started the 10/1 fourth choice in the betting for the King George VI and Queen Elizabeth Stakes over the same course and distance in July but ran very poorly and came home ninth of the eleven runners, more than 34 lengths behind the winner Enable. He did not race again in 2019.

In the 2019 World's Best Racehorse Rankings Defoe was given a rating of 118, making him the 78th best racehorse in the world.

=== 2020: six-year-old season ===
For his first run of 2020 Defoe was sent to the United Arab Emirates for the Dubai City of Gold over 2400 metres at Meydan Racecourse on 7 March. He started the odds-on favourite but despite finishing very strongly he failed by a short head to overhaul Loxley. The 2020 flat racing season was disrupted by the COVID-19 pandemic and the Coronation Cup was run behind closed doors at Newmarket on 5 June. Defoe started at odds of 7/1 as he attempted to repeat his 2019 success but came home fifth of the seven runners, beaten more than fifteen lengths by the winner Ghaiyyath. Two weeks later in the Hardwicke Stakes at Royal Ascot he kept on well in the straight to take third place behind Fanny Logan and Alounak.

On 29 July Defoe sustained a fatal injury in a training gallop. Roger Varian said "Although not large in stature Defoe had the heart of a lion... We can’t help but have favourites and Defoe was everyone's favourite... He was a lovely horse. He climbed the ranks from humble beginnings... He was just a pleasure to do anything with. My children loved him and he was the first one they went to give a carrot to".

== Pedigree ==
Pedigree of Defoe, grey gelding, 2014
Sire Dalakhani (IRE) 2000	Darshaan (GB); 1981	Shirley Heights	Mill Reef (USA)
Sire Dalakhani (IRE) 2000	Darshaan (GB); 1981	Shirley Heights	Hardiemma
Sire Dalakhani (IRE) 2000	Darshaan (GB); 1981	Delsy (FR)	Abdos
Sire Dalakhani (IRE) 2000	Darshaan (GB); 1981	Delsy (FR)	Kelty
Sire Dalakhani (IRE) 2000	Daltawa (IRE); 1989	Miswaki (USA)	Mr. Prospector
Sire Dalakhani (IRE) 2000	Daltawa (IRE); 1989	Miswaki (USA)	Hopespringseternal
Sire Dalakhani (IRE) 2000	Daltawa (IRE); 1989	Damana (FR)	Crystal Palace
Sire Dalakhani (IRE) 2000	Daltawa (IRE); 1989	Damana (FR)	Denia
Dam Dulkashe (IRE) 2009	Pivotal (GB); 1993	Polar Falcon (USA)	Nureyev
Dam Dulkashe (IRE) 2009	Pivotal (GB); 1993	Polar Falcon (USA)	Marie d'Argonne (FR)
Dam Dulkashe (IRE) 2009	Pivotal (GB); 1993	Fearless Revival	Cozzene (USA)
Dam Dulkashe (IRE) 2009	Pivotal (GB); 1993	Fearless Revival	Stufida
Dam Dulkashe (IRE) 2009	Saik (USA); 1996	Riverman	Never Bend
Dam Dulkashe (IRE) 2009	Saik (USA); 1996	Riverman	River Lady
Dam Dulkashe (IRE) 2009	Saik (USA); 1996	Close Comfort	Far North (CAN)
Dam Dulkashe (IRE) 2009	Saik (USA); 1996	Close Comfort	Caterina (GB) (Family 15-a)
