= Coronet (horse) =

British-bred Thoroughbred racehorse

- Sire: Dubawi
- Grandsire: Dubai Millennium
- Dam: Approach
- Damsire: Darshaan
- Sex: Mare
- Foaled: 24 February 2014
- Country: United Kingdom
- Colour: Grey
- Breeder: Denford Stud
- Owner: Denford Stud
- Trainer: John Gosden
- Record: 18: 6-4-3
- Earnings: £1,217,469

Major wins
- Zetland Stakes (2016); Ribblesdale Stakes (2017); Middleton Stakes (2018); Grand Prix de Saint-Cloud (2019); Prix Jean Romanet (2019)

Coronet (foaled 24 February 2014) is a British-trained Thoroughbred racehorse. As a two-year-old in 2016 she won both of her races including the Listed Zetland Stakes. In the following year her only win came in the Ribblesdale Stakes but she also finished second in the Yorkshire Oaks, third in the Prix Saint-Alary and the British Champions Fillies & Mares Stakes and fourth in the Irish Oaks. As a four-year-old she won the Middleton Stakes and was placed in the Grand Prix de Saint-Cloud, Yorkshire Oaks, British Champions Fillies & Mares Stakes and King George VI and Queen Elizabeth Stakes. She had her greatest success as a five-year-old when she recorded Group 1 victories in the Grand Prix de Saint-Cloud and Prix Jean Romanet.

== Background ==
Coronet is a grey mare bred and owned by Faisal bin Salman's Denford Stud. She was sent into training with John Gosden at the Clarehaven Stable in Newmarket, Suffolk

She was sired by Dubawi, whose wins included the Irish 2,000 Guineas and the Prix Jacques Le Marois. At stud, Dubawi has been a highly-successful breeding stallion, siring major winners such as Monterosso, Al Kazeem, Makfi, Lucky Nine and Night of Thunder. Coronet's dam Approach showed very good form on the track, winning the Ballymacoll Stud Stakes. She went on to a successful broodmare whose other foals included the St Leger runner-up Midas Touch. Approach's dam Last Second won the Nassau Stakes and produced the Poule d'Essai des Poulains winner Aussie Rules.

== Racing career ==
=== 2016: two-year-old season ===
Coronet's racecourse career began on 6 September 2016 when she started the 11/10 favourite for a maiden race over one mile at Leicester Racecourse. Ridden by Frankie Dettori she took the lead approaching the final furlong and despite "idling" in the closing stages she won "comfortably" by half a length from Alwaysandforever. On 8 October, with Dettori again in the saddle, the filly was moved up in class and distance for the Listed Zetland Stakes over ten furlongs at Newmarket Racecourse in which she was pitted against male opposition. Starting the 3/1 favourite she overcame a slow start and interference in the last quarter mile to win by a neck from her stablemate Cunco with Wings of Eagles in fourth and Defoe unplaced. After the race Dettori said "She's an inexperienced filly but has learned a lot from her first race. She's a lovely filly and one we can dream about over the winter."

=== 2017: three-year-old season ===
Coronet began her second season in the Group 1 Prix Saint-Alary (run that year at Deauville Racecourse) for which she started favourite but was beaten into third behind Sobetsu and Vue Fantastique. In the Epsom Oaks over one and a half miles at Epsom Racecourse on 2 June she was never in serious contention and came home fifth of the nine runners, almost sixteen lengths behind the winner Enable (also trained by Gosden). Three weeks later at Royal Ascot the filly was dropped back to Group 2 class for the Ribblesdale Stakes and started the 9/1 fourth choice in the betting behind Mori (Height of Fashion Stakes), Alluringly (third in the Oaks) and Naughty Or Nice (Yeats Stakes). After racing in mid-division she was switched to the outside in the straight by her rider Olivier Peslier and produced a strong late run to win by a neck from Mori. John Gosden commented "It was a great run from Coronet. She ran in the Oaks and liked the uphill but not the downhill. It was a high-class race today. She will get further than a mile and a half."

In her remaining four races Coronet was campaigned in the highest class and ran well without winning. She finished fourth to Enable in the Irish Oaks at the Curragh in July and second to the same filly in the Yorkshire Oaks at York Racecourse in August. In September she took on male opponents in the St Leger at Doncaster Racecourse and came home fifth behind Capri, Crystal Ocean, Stradivarius and Rekindling. On her final run of the season she contested the British Champions Fillies & Mares Stakes at Ascot and finished third to Hydrangea.

=== 2018: four-year-old season ===
On her debut as a four-year-old Coronet started 2/1 favourite for the Group 2 Middleton Stakes over ten and a half furlongs at York on 17 May when her six opponents included Mori, Chain of Daisies (Winter Hill Stakes), Turret Rocks (May Hill Stakes) and the South African mare Smart Call. After tracking the leaders, Dettori sent the favourite to the front two furlongs out and Coronet stayed on well to win by one and a half lengths from Horseplay. Dettori said "She's brilliant, she's honest and she's got an engine. It's just nice to be around her. When you get up on a morning and see your name down to ride her it's a privilege".

On 1 July the filly was sent to France for the Group 1 Grand Prix de Saint-Cloud and went down by a short head to the four-year-old colt Waldgeist after a closely contested struggle in the last 100 metres. At the end of the month she contested Britain's most prestigious weight-for-age race, the King George VI and Queen Elizabeth Stakes over on and a half miles at Ascot and finished third behind Poet's Word and Crystal Ocean. In August she ran for the second time in the Yorkshire Oaks and ran second to the three-year-old Sea of Class. As in 2017 the filly ended her campaign with a run in the British Champions Fillies & Mares Stakes in October when she finished second of the eleven runners behind Magical.

=== 2019: five-year-old season ===
Coronet's fourth campaign began on 4 May 2019 when she finished fourth behind Defoe in the Jockey Club Stakes at Newmarket. On 30 June she made her second attempt to win the Grand Prix de Saint-Cloud in which she was partnered by Dettori and started at odds of 2.2/1. The favourite was Morgan La Faye (Prix Corrida), while the other five runners were Lah Ti Dar (Middleton Stakes), Marmelo (runner-up in the Melbourne Cup), Aspetar (Grand Prix de Chantilly), Ziyad (Prix Michel Houyvet) and Thundering Blue (Stockholm Cup International). After racing in mid-division Coronet produced a sustained run along the inside rail in the straight and got up in the final strides to win by a short neck and a short head from Ziyad and Lah Ti Dar. John Gosden said "We had planned for this race all year after she just missed out last year... She's a very honest filly. She deserves this first Group 1 success".

Immediately after her Group 1 breakthrough win, it was reported that Coronet would retire at the end of the season and join the other broodmares at her owner-breeder's Denford Stud in Hungerford.

The mare was back in France for the Prix Jean Romanet over 2000 metres on heavy ground at Deauville on 18 August and was made the 1.7/1 favourite ahead of seven opponents including With You (Prix Rothschild), Wild Illusion, I Can Fly (runner-up in the Queen Elizabeth II Stakes), Worth Waiting (Dahlia Stakes) and Musis Amica (Prix de la Grotte). Coronet raced in third place behind Wild Illusion and Red Tea before going to the front 300 metres out nd holding off the late challenge of With You to win by three quarters of a length. Gosden commented "We were losing count of how many times she was second in a Group 1, so it's great she's come and won. She had to battle to win the Grand Prix de Saint-Cloud and a mile and a quarter is probably not her best trip here. It's lovely to get two Group 1s into her".

On her final appearance the mare started second favourite for the Champion Stakes at Ascot on 19 October but tired badly in the straight and came home sixth of the nine runners behind Magical.

== Pedigree ==
Pedigree of Coronet (GB), grey mare, 2014
Sire Dubawi (IRE) 2002	Dubai Millennium (GB); 1996	Seeking the Gold (USA)	Mr. Prospector
Sire Dubawi (IRE) 2002	Dubai Millennium (GB); 1996	Seeking the Gold (USA)	Con Game
Sire Dubawi (IRE) 2002	Dubai Millennium (GB); 1996	Colorado Dancer (IRE)	Shareef Dancer (USA)
Sire Dubawi (IRE) 2002	Dubai Millennium (GB); 1996	Colorado Dancer (IRE)	Fall Aspen (USA)
Sire Dubawi (IRE) 2002	Zomaradah (GB); 1995	Deploy	Shirley Heights
Sire Dubawi (IRE) 2002	Zomaradah (GB); 1995	Deploy	Slightly Dangerous (USA)
Sire Dubawi (IRE) 2002	Zomaradah (GB); 1995	Jawaher (IRE)	Dancing Brave (USA)
Sire Dubawi (IRE) 2002	Zomaradah (GB); 1995	Jawaher (IRE)	High Tern
Dam Approach (GB) 2000	Darshaan (GB); 1981	Shirley Heights	Mill Reef (USA)
Dam Approach (GB) 2000	Darshaan (GB); 1981	Shirley Heights	Hardiemma
Dam Approach (GB) 2000	Darshaan (GB); 1981	Delsy (FR)	Abdos
Dam Approach (GB) 2000	Darshaan (GB); 1981	Delsy (FR)	Kelty
Dam Approach (GB) 2000	Last Second (IRE); 1993	Alzao (USA)	Lyphard
Dam Approach (GB) 2000	Last Second (IRE); 1993	Alzao (USA)	Lady Rebecca (GB)
Dam Approach (GB) 2000	Last Second (IRE); 1993	Alruccaba	Crystal Palace (FR)
Dam Approach (GB) 2000	Last Second (IRE); 1993	Alruccaba	Allara (GB) (Family 9-c)

- Coronet was inbred 3 × 4 to Shirley Heights, meaning that this stallion appears in both the third and fourth generations of her pedigree.
