= Middleton Stakes =

Flat horse race in Britain

- Class: Group 2
- Location: York Racecourse; York, England
- Inaugurated: 1981
- Race type: Flat / Thoroughbred
- Sponsor: Al Basti Equiworld
- Website: York

Race information
- Distance: 1m 2f 56y (2,063m)
- Surface: Turf
- Track: Left-handed
- Qualification: Four-years-old and up fillies and mares
- Weight: 9 st 2 lb Penalties; 3 lb for Group 1 winners* since 2023
- Purse: £160,500 (2025); 1st: £91,020

Middleton Stakes
2026
See The Fire	Red Letter	Diamond Rain

Previous years
2025
See The Fire	Beautiful Love	Royal Dress
2024
Bluestocking	Free Wind	Infinite Cosmos
2023
Free Wind	Rogue Millennium	Poptronic
2022
Lilac Road	Aristia	Thunder Kiss
2021
Queen Power	Chamade	Cabaletta

2020-2011
2019
Lah Ti Dar	Rawdaa	Sun Maiden
2018
Coronet	Horseplay	Smart Call
2017
Blond Me	The Black Princess	Smart Call
2016
Beautiful Romance	Koora	Journey
2015
Secret Gesture	Talmada	Ribbons
2014
Ambivalent	Secret Gesture	Odeliz
2013
Dalkala	Ambivalent	Ladys First
2012
Izzi Top	Sajjhaa	I'm A Dreamer
2011
Midday	Sajjhaa	Timepiece

2010-2001
2010
Sariska	Midday	Flying Cloud
2009
Crystal Capella	Dar Re Mi	Princess Taylor
2008
Promising Lead	Under The Rainbow	Flying Clarets
2007
Topatoo	Anna Pavlova	Portal
2006
Strawberry Dale	Mango Mischief	Portrayal
2005
All Too Beautiful	La Persiana	Saintly Rachel
2004
Crimson Palace	Beneventa	Summitville
2003
Zee Zee Top	Chorist	Aldora
2002
Jalousie	Salim Toto	Corsican Sunset
2001
Moselle	Valentine Band	Everlasting Love

2000-1991
2000
Lafite	Fantazia	Boismorand
1999
Lady In Waiting	Primary Colours	Diamond White
1998
Arriving	Star Precision	Tempting Prospect
1997
Papering	Charlotte Corday	Ball Gown
1996
Bathilde	Kinlochewe	Rouge Rancon
1995
Ludgate	Watch The Clock	Dawlah
1994
Wijdan	From Beyond	Little Sister
1993
Dayflower	Helvellyn	Chain Dance
1992
Skimble	Resounding Success	Nina's Chocolates
1991
Clare Heights	Shoka	Fly To The Moon

1990-1988
1990
Hellenic	Ballet Classique	Valira
1989
Nearctic Flame	Shayraz	Krisalya
1988
Catawba	Bourbon Topsy	Karaferya

The Middleton Stakes is a Group 2 flat horse race in Great Britain open to fillies and mares aged four years or older. It is run over a distance of 1 mile, 2 furlongs and 56 yards (2,063 metres) at York in May.

== History ==
The event was established in 1981, and it was originally restricted to three-year-old fillies. The first running was won by Pipina.

The present version for older fillies was introduced in 1997. It initially held Listed status. It was promoted to Group 3 level in 2004, and to Group 2 in 2010.

The Middleton Stakes is currently staged on the second day of York's three-day Dante Festival meeting. It is run on the same day as the Dante Stakes.

== Records ==
Most successful horse (2 wins):

- See The Fire - 2025, 2026

Leading jockey (5 wins):

- Frankie Dettori - Papering (1997), Crimson Palace (2004), Coronet (2018), Lah Ti Dar (2019), Free Wind (2023)

Leading trainer (7 wins):

- Sir Michael Stoute – Nearctic Flame (1989), Hellenic (1990), Bathilde (1996), Zee Zee Top (2003), Promising Lead (2008), Crystal Capella (2009), Queen Power (2021)

== Winners ==
Year	Winner	Age	Jockey	Trainer	Time
1981	Pipina	3	Pat Eddery	Harry Wragg	2:23.32
1982	Cut Loose	3	Willie Carson	Dick Hern	2:14.34
1983	Malvern Beauty	3	Lester Piggott	Henry Cecil	2:21.50
1984	Glowing With Pride	3	Pat Eddery	Geoff Wragg	2:11.89
1985	Rye Tops	3	Brian Rouse	Geoff Wragg	2:18.47
1986	Gull Nook	3	Pat Eddery	John Dunlop	2:18.00
1987	Nom de Plume	3	Steve Cauthen	Henry Cecil	2:12.02
1988	Catawba	3	Steve Cauthen	Henry Cecil	2:14.36
1989	Nearctic Flame	3	Walter Swinburn	Michael Stoute	2:08.15
1990	Hellenic	3	Walter Swinburn	Michael Stoute	2:12.22
1991	Clare Heights	3	Walter Swinburn	James Fanshawe	2:14.06
1992	Skimble	3	Pat Eddery	Henry Cecil	2:11.48
1993	Dayflower	3	Walter Swinburn	Satish Seemar	2:14.10
1994	Wijdan	3	Willie Carson	Dick Hern	2:10.39
1995	Ludgate	3	George Duffield	Robert Williams	2:13.74
1996	Bathilde	3	Michael Kinane	Michael Stoute	2:10.01
1997	Papering	4	Frankie Dettori	Luca Cumani	2:11.77
1998	Arriving	4	Michael Hills	John Hills	2:12.17
1999	Lady in Waiting	4	Richard Quinn	Paul Cole	2:16.20
2000	Lafite	4	Richard Hills	John Hills	2:08.79
2001	Moselle	4	Richard Quinn	William Haggas	2:11.12
2002	Jalousie	4	George Duffield	Chris Wall	2:10.04
2003	Zee Zee Top	4	Kieren Fallon	Sir Michael Stoute	2:11.03
2004	Crimson Palace	5	Frankie Dettori	Saeed bin Suroor	2:15.68
2005	All Too Beautiful	4	Kieren Fallon	Aidan O'Brien	2:15.88
2006	Strawberry Dale	4	Jamie Spencer	James Bethell	2:19.41
2007	Topatoo	5	Michael Hills	Mark Tompkins	2:13.83
2008	Promising Lead	4	Ryan Moore	Sir Michael Stoute	2:08.20
2009	Crystal Capella	4	Ryan Moore	Sir Michael Stoute	2:15.03
2010	Sariska	4	Jamie Spencer	Michael Bell	2:06.20
2011	Midday	5	Tom Queally	Henry Cecil	2:10.05
2012	Izzi Top	4	William Buick	John Gosden	2:11.62
2013	Dalkala	4	Christophe Lemaire	Alain de Royer-Dupré	2:12.43
2014	Ambivalent	5	Andrea Atzeni	Roger Varian	2:10.21
2015	Secret Gesture	5	Andrea Atzeni	Ralph Beckett	2:10.48
2016	Beautiful Romance	4	James Doyle	Saeed bin Suroor	2:08.85
2017	Blond Me	5	Oisin Murphy	Andrew Balding	2:09.76
2018	Coronet	4	Frankie Dettori	John Gosden	2:08.01
2019	Lah Ti Dar	4	Frankie Dettori	John Gosden	2:10.38
	no race 2020 (Note: The 2020 running was cancelled because of the COVID-19 pandemic in the United Kingdom)
2021	Queen Power	5	Silvestre de Sousa	Sir Michael Stoute	2:09.89
2022	Lilac Road	4	Tom Marquand	William Haggas	2:11.50
2023	Free Wind	5	Frankie Dettori	John & Thady Gosden	2:10.06
2024	Bluestocking	4	Rossa Ryan	Ralph Beckett	2:09.80
2025	See The Fire	4	Oisin Murphy	Andrew Balding	2:09.44
2026	See The Fire	5	Oisin Murphy	Andrew Balding	2:17.82

== See also ==
- Horse racing in Great Britain
- List of British flat horse races
