= Talismanic (horse) =

British-bred Thoroughbred racehorse

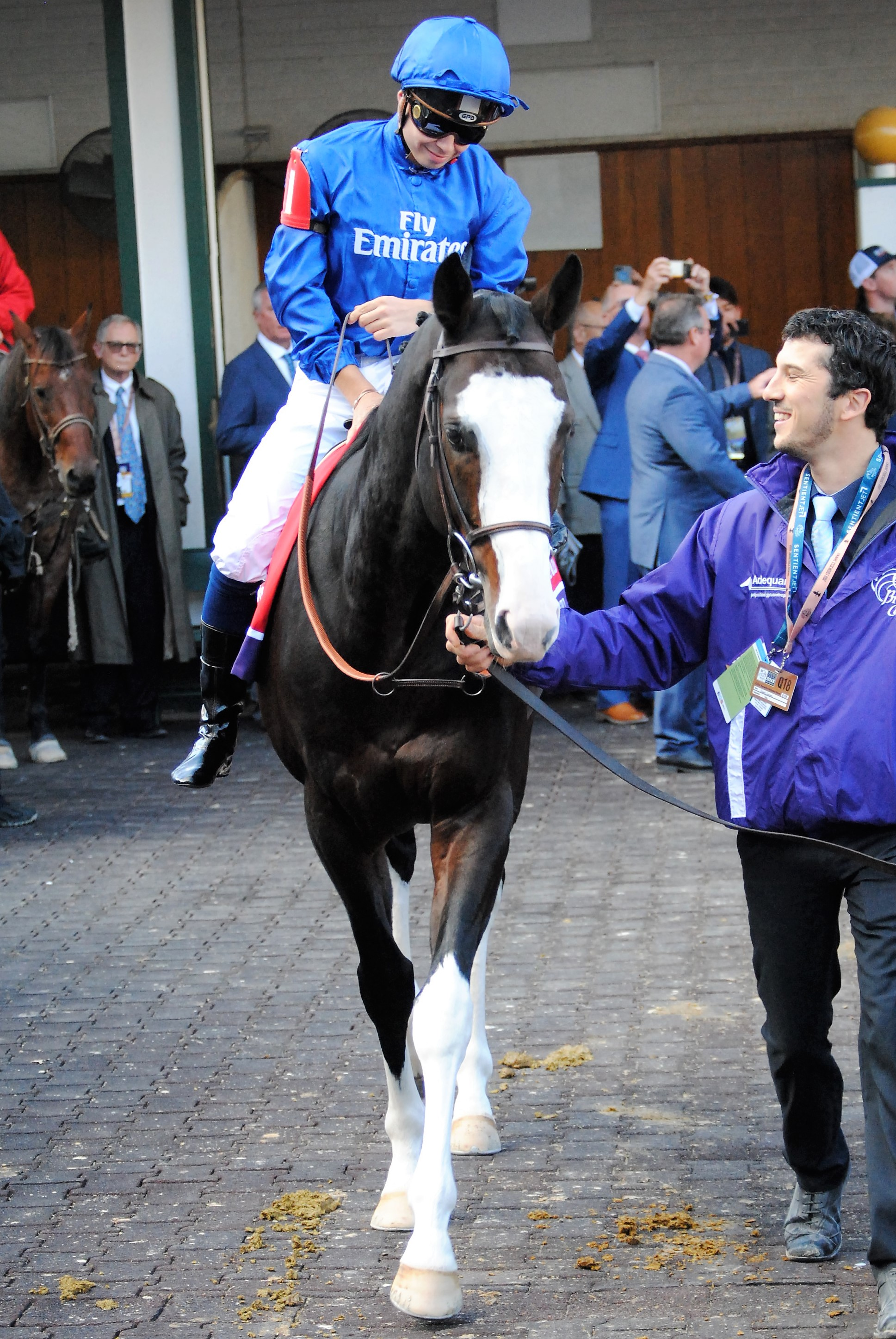
- Talismanic at the 2018 Breeders' Cup
- Sire: Medaglia d'Oro
- Grandsire: El Prado (IRE)
- Dam: Magic Mission (GB)
- Damsire: Machiavellian
- Sex: Stallion
- Foaled: February 28, 2013
- Country: Great Britain
- Colour: Dark bay
- Breeder: Darley
- Owner: Godolphin SNC
- Trainer: André Fabre
- Record: 21: 7-7-1
- Earnings: £2,548,973

Major wins
- Prix l'Avre (2016); Prix Turenne (2016); Prix Lord Seymour (2016); Prix Maurice de Nieuil (2017); Darshaan Stakes (2018); Prix Gontaut-Biron (2018) Breeders' Cup wins: Breeders' Cup Turf (2017)
- Last updated on November 16, 2018

Talismanic (foaled February 28, 2013) is a retired British-bred, French-trained Thoroughbred racehorse who achieved his greatest success in America in the 2017 Breeders' Cup Turf.

== Background ==
Talismanic is a "photogenic" dark bay horse with a large white blaze and four white stockings. He was bred by Darley Stud, which purchased his sire Medaglia d'Oro in 2009. Medaglia d'Oro was the most successful performer on the dirt of El Prado, a son of Sadler's Wells, with major wins including the Travers Stakes, Whitney Handicap and Donn Handicap. As a sire, Medaglia d'Oro is best known for his American runners on the dirt, including champions Rachel Alexandra and Songbird, but has also had success with turf performers in Australia and Europe.

Talismanic's dam Magic Mission is a stakes-winning daughter of Machiavellian. She descends from the outstanding mare Highclere, winner of the 1000 Guineas and Prix de Diane. Other members of this family include Deep Impact, Nayef, Nashwan and Unfuwain.

Talismanic is owned by Godolphin, the racing arm of Darley Stud. He was trained by André Fabre and regularly ridden by Mickael Barzalona.

== Racing career ==
Talismanic made his debut on 15 July 2015 at Deauville, finishing fifth in a maiden race over 1200 metres. He improved to finish second at Fontainebleau on 15 September, then broke his maiden with a seven-length victory at Compiègne over 2200 metres.

Talismanic made his first start as a three-year-old on 2 March 2016 at Saint-Cloud in the listed Prix Maurice Caittault, finishing second. He returned on 16 May to win the Prix de l'Avre at a distance of 2400 metres by 1 3/4 lengths. This encouraged Fabre to enter him in the Prix du Jockey-Club at Chantilly on 16 June, where he finished a creditable fourth to Almanzor. He next started in the Grand Prix de Paris on 14 July, in which he finished fifth but was beaten by only 2 3/4 lengths. He returned to the winner's enclosure in the listed Prix Turenne on 14 September before finishing a well-beaten eleventh in the Prix de l'Arc de Triomphe.

=== 2017: four-year-old season ===
Talismanic began his four-year-old campaign on 17 March 2017 with a second-place finish in the listed Prix de la Porte de Madrid. He then went off as favourite in the Prix Lord Seymour on 17 April over a distance of 2400m. He set a slow early pace then accelerated about 300m from the finish line to win comfortably. In his next starts, he finished second in both the Prix d'Hédouville and Grand Prix de Chantilly.

On 17 July, Talismanic earned his first Group win in the Prix Maurice de Nieuil on firm going at Saint-Cloud, in which he set a course record for 2800m of 2m 58.40. He was held up well behind the early leaders then displayed an impressive turn of foot in the straight to win. Fabre then considered entering him in the Sword Dancer Stakes at Saratoga in America, but arrangements fell through. He instead finished a fast-finishing third on heavy going in the Prix Foy behind Dschingis Secret and Cloth of Stars.

Despite Talismanic's limited success at the highest level of racing, Fabre felt confident enough in the colt's ability to ship him to California for the Breeders' Cup Turf at Del Mar on 4 November. "I thought it would suit him because of his breeding, because of his balance, because of his mind and because of his ability", said Fabre. "He's a better horse than you've seen but difficult to place, which is why he went for longer-distance races."

Handicappers considered him to be a good longshot option in an excellent field that included defending champion Highland Reel and multiple graded/group one stakes winners such as Beach Patrol, Oscar Performance and Seventh Heaven. Talismanic raced a few lengths behind the early pace set by Oscar Performance, with Beach Patrol and Highland Reel tracking in second and third respectively. Around the final turn, Beach Patrol moved to the lead but Talismanic then started his drive and pulled away to win by half a length.

Joe Osborne of Godolphin credited Fabre for the win. "The man is a living legend", he said. "He's just a master trainer and trained this horse perfectly. So, it's just a great result for us by our stallion, and bred by us and everything. So it just ticks all the boxes."

Talismanic finished his four-year-old campaign on 10 December in the Hong Kong Vase at Sha Tin. He tracked a few lengths behind the early pace set by Helene Charisma followed by Highland Reel, who took command at the top of the straight. Talismanic then made a strong move to close to within a half length before Highland Reel responded and drew off to win by 1 3/4 lengths.

=== 2018: five-year-old season ===
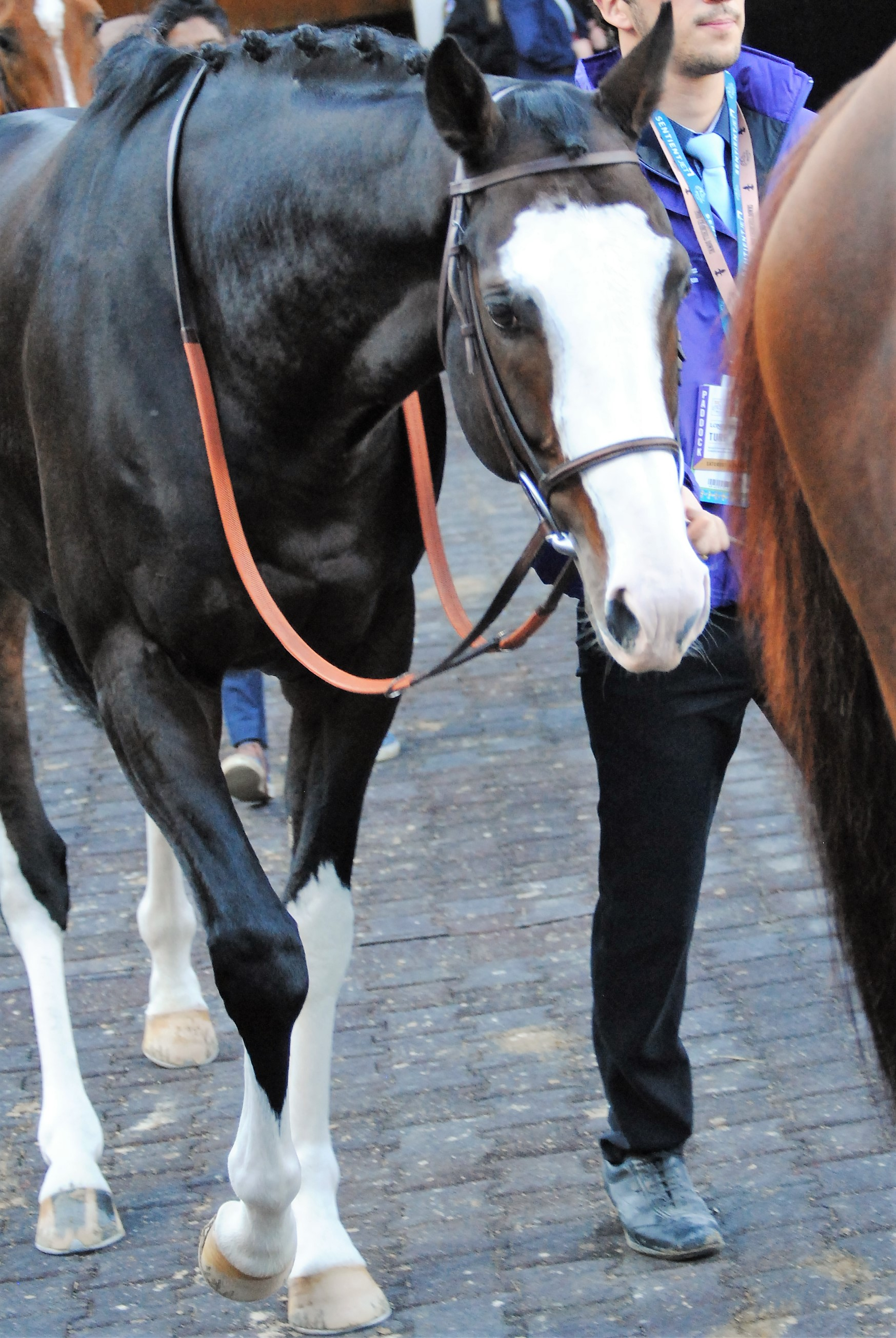
Talismanic at the 2018 Breeders' Cup

Talismanic made his first start of 2018 on 6 March over Chantilly's Fibresand all-weather surface in the Darshaan Stakes at a distance of 1,900m. He tracked the early pace until they entered the stretch, at which time Talismanic took control of the race. Cloth of Stars, the runner-up in the 2017 Prix de l'Arc de Triomphe, finished second. Fabre used the race as a prep for Talismanic's next scheduled start, the Dubai World Cup, in which Talismanic finished a disappointing ninth.

Fabre then gave Talismanic a "short holiday" before resuming training for the Prix Gontaut-Biron at Deauville on 15 August. On a good-to-soft turf course, he settled into fourth place during the early running, then took command with a furlong and a half remaining in the race. Eased near the wire, he still won by two lengths over Subway Dancer.

Talismanic was entered in the Prix Foy on 16 September, in which he tracked the early pace before taking the lead in the homestretch. He could not match the closing speed of Waldgeist and finished 2 1/2 lengths behind, just holding off Cloth of Stars for second. He then finished 13th behind Enable in the Prix de l'Arc de Triomphe on 7 October. Returning to the United States for the Breeders' Cup Turf on 3 November, he had a poor trip and finished sixth.

== Retirement ==
On November 16, Godolphin announced that Talismanic had been retired. He entered stud in 2019 at Darley Japan for a fee of 1,800,000 Yen.

As of 2024, Talismanic stands at Darley Japan for 1,200,000 Yen.

== Pedigree ==
Pedigree of Talismanic, dark bay or brown colt, 2013
Sire Medaglia d'Oro 1999	El Prado (IRE); 1989	Sadler's Wells	Northern Dancer
Sire Medaglia d'Oro 1999	El Prado (IRE); 1989	Sadler's Wells	Fairy Ridge
Sire Medaglia d'Oro 1999	El Prado (IRE); 1989	Lady Capulet	Sir Ivor
Sire Medaglia d'Oro 1999	El Prado (IRE); 1989	Lady Capulet	Caps and Bells
Sire Medaglia d'Oro 1999	Cappucino Bay; 1989	Bailjumper	Damascus
Sire Medaglia d'Oro 1999	Cappucino Bay; 1989	Bailjumper	Court Circuit
Sire Medaglia d'Oro 1999	Cappucino Bay; 1989	Dubbed In	Silent Screen
Sire Medaglia d'Oro 1999	Cappucino Bay; 1989	Dubbed In	Society Singer
Dam Magic Mission (GB) 1998	Machiavellian; 1987	Mr. Prospector	Raise a Native
Dam Magic Mission (GB) 1998	Machiavellian; 1987	Mr. Prospector	Gold Digger
Dam Magic Mission (GB) 1998	Machiavellian; 1987	Coup de Folie	Halo
Dam Magic Mission (GB) 1998	Machiavellian; 1987	Coup de Folie	Raise the Standard
Dam Magic Mission (GB) 1998	Dream Ticket; 1992	Danzig	Northern Dancer
Dam Magic Mission (GB) 1998	Dream Ticket; 1992	Danzig	Pas de Nom
Dam Magic Mission (GB) 1998	Dream Ticket; 1992	Capo Di Monte (IRE)	Final Straw (GB)
Dam Magic Mission (GB) 1998	Dream Ticket; 1992	Capo Di Monte (IRE)	Burghclere (family: 2-f)

Talismanic is inbred 4S x 4D to Northern Dancer, meaning this stallion appears twice in the fourth generation of his pedigree.
