= September Stakes =

Flat horse race in Britain

- Class: Group 3
- Location: Kempton Park, Sunbury, England
- Inaugurated: 1979
- Race type: Flat / Thoroughbred
- Sponsor: Unibet
- Website: Kempton Park

Race information
- Distance: 1m 3f 219y (2,413 metres)
- Surface: Polytrack
- Track: Right-handed
- Qualification: Three-years-old and up
- Weight: 8 st 11 lb (3yo); 9 st 5 lb (4yo+); Allowances; 3 lb for fillies and mares Penalties; 7 lb for Group 1 winners * 5 lb for Group 2 winners * 3 lb for Group 3 winners * * after 31 March
- Purse: £88,533 (2022); 1st: £51,039

September Stakes
2026
Pride Of Arras	Gethin	Warrant Holder

Previous years
2025
Giavellotto	Kalpana	Meydaan
2024
Kalpana	Lion's Pride	God's Window
2023
Bay Bridge	Candleford	Max Vega
2022
Mostahdaf	Dubai Honour	Universal Order
2021
Hamish	Hukum	Fox Tal

2020-2011
2020
Enable	Kirstenbosch	Prince Of Arran
2019
Royal Line	Mootasadir	Prince Of Arran
2018
Enable	Crystal Ocean	Cribbs Causeway
2017
Chemical Charge	Scarlet Dragon	Wild Hacked
2016
Arab Spring	Robin Of Navan	Sky Hunter
2015
Jack Hobbs	Sweeping Up	Arab Dawn
2014
Prince Bishop	Secret Number	Battalion
2013
Prince Bishop	Royal Empire	Main Sequence
2012
Dandino	Sagramor	Modun
2011
Modun	Bronze Cannon	Harris Tweed

2010-2001
2010
Laaheb	Holberg	Classic Punch
2009
Kirklees	All The Aces	Indian Days
2008
Hattan	Illustrious Blue	Mourilyan
2007
Steppe Dancer	Al Tharib	Lion Sands
2006
Kandidate	Crosspeace	Self Defense
2005
Imperial Stride	Mamool	The Whistling Teal
2004
Mamool	Alkaased	Bandari
2003
Mubtaker	First Charter	Indian Creek
2002
Asian Heights	Leadership	Frankies Dream
2001
Mutamam	Perfect Sunday	Delius

2000-1991
2000
Mutamam	Kuwait Trooper	Pawn Broker
1999
Yavana's Pace	Blueprint	Maylane
1998
Crimson Tide	Punishment	Ferny Hill
1997
Maylane	Dushyantor	Posidonas
1996
Sacrament	Salmon Ladder	Ela-Aristokrati
1995
Burooj	Commoner	Wayne County
1994
Wagon Master	Urgent Request	Dancing Bloom
1993
Spartan Shareef	Bobzao	Captain Horatius
1992
Jeune	Red Bishop	Seattle Rhyme
1991
Young Buster	Quest For Fame	Dolpour

1990-1988
1990
Lord Of The Field	Roseate Tern	Song Of Sixpence
1989
Assatis	Relief Pitcher	Tralos
1988
Percy's Lass	Glacial Storm	Alwuhush

The September Stakes is a Group 3 flat horse race in Great Britain open to horses aged three years or older. It is run at Kempton Park over a distance of 1 mile 3 furlongs and 219 yards (2,413 metres), and it is scheduled to take place each year in early September.

== History ==
The event was established in 1979, and it was originally contested on turf over 1 mile, 3 furlongs and 30 yards. For a period it was classed at Listed level, and it was promoted to Group 3 status in 1982.

The race was transferred to Epsom and extended by about 200 yards in 1997. It returned to Kempton in 2000.

The September Stakes was held at Newmarket in 2005, as its regular venue was closed for redevelopment. It was switched to Kempton's newly opened Polytrack track in 2006.

== Records ==
Most successful horse (2 wins):

- Enable – 2018, 2020
- Mutamam – 2000, 2001
- Prince Bishop - 2013, 2014

Leading jockey (4 wins):

- Frankie Dettori – Mamool (2004), Kirklees (2009), Enable (2018, 2020)
- Richard Hills – Mutamam (2000), Mubtaker (2003), Imperial Stride (2005), Laaheb (2010)
- Walter Swinburn – Shernazar (1985), Dihistan (1986), Young Buster (1991), Sacrament (1996)

Leading trainer (7 wins):

- Sir Michael Stoute – Shernazar (1985), Dihistan (1986), Sacrament (1996), Imperial Stride (2005), Modun (2011), Arab Spring (2016), Bay Bridge (2023)

== Winners ==
Year	Winner	Age	Jockey	Trainer	Time
	Turf before 2006
1979	Cracaval	3	Steve Cauthen	Barry Hills	2:18.18
1980	More Light	4	Willie Carson	Dick Hern	2:18.27
1981	Kind of Hush	3	Steve Cauthen	Barry Hills	2:18.29
1982	Critique	4	Lester Piggott	Henry Cecil	2:22.62
1983	Lyphard's Special	3	Brian Rouse	Guy Harwood	2:23.54
1984	Bedtime	4	Willie Carson	Dick Hern	2:19.30
1985	Shernazar	4	Walter Swinburn	Michael Stoute	2:16.20
1986	Dihistan	4	Walter Swinburn	Michael Stoute	2:18.81
1987	Knockando	3	Ray Cochrane	Luca Cumani	2:21.59
1988	Percy's Lass	4	Pat Eddery	Geoff Wragg	2:22.61
1989	Assatis	4	Ray Cochrane	Guy Harwood	2:21.06
1990	Lord of the Field	3	Billy Newnes	James Toller	2:18.19
1991	Young Buster	3	Walter Swinburn	Geoff Wragg	2:19.26
1992	Jeune	3	Ray Cochrane	Geoff Wragg	2:22.61
1993	Spartan Shareef	4	Alan Munro	Clive Brittain	2:20.23
1994	Wagon Master	4	Willie Carson	Alec Stewart	2:22.42
1995	Burooj	5	Brent Thomson	David Morley	2:23.27
1996	Sacrament	5	Walter Swinburn	Michael Stoute	2:19.58
1997	Maylane	3	Michael Roberts	Alec Stewart	2:36.69
1998	Crimson Tide	4	Michael Hills	John Hills	2:44.71
1999	Yavana's Pace	7	Joe Fanning	Mark Johnston	2:35.76
2000	Mutamam	5	Richard Hills	Alec Stewart	2:31.77
2001	Mutamam	6	Philip Robinson	Alec Stewart	2:35.68
2002	Asian Heights	4	Darryll Holland	Geoff Wragg	2:32.99
2003	Mubtaker	6	Richard Hills	Marcus Tregoning	2:31.72
2004	Mamool	5	Frankie Dettori	Saeed bin Suroor	2:31.13
2005 ^{[a]}	Imperial Stride	4	Richard Hills	Sir Michael Stoute	2:29.11
	Polytrack after 2005
2006	Kandidate	4	Seb Sanders	Clive Brittain	2:32.69
2007	Steppe Dancer	4	Tom Queally	Denis Coakley	2:31.58
2008	Hattan	6	Neil Callan	Clive Brittain	2:30.50
2009	Kirklees	5	Frankie Dettori	Saeed bin Suroor	2:31.19
2010	Laaheb	4	Richard Hills	Michael Jarvis	2:30.74
2011	Modun	4	Shane Kelly	Sir Michael Stoute	2:31.10
2012	Dandino	5	Jim Crowley	James Fanshawe	2:30.70
2013	Prince Bishop	6	Kieren Fallon	Saeed bin Suroor	2:30.02
2014	Prince Bishop	7	Frederik Tylicki	Saeed bin Suroor	2:29.77
2015	Jack Hobbs	3	William Buick	John Gosden	2:35.01
2016	Arab Spring	6	Jim Crowley	Sir Michael Stoute	2:33.07
2017	Chemical Charge	5	Oisin Murphy	Ralph Beckett	2:34.55
2018	Enable	4	Frankie Dettori	John Gosden	2:30.57
2019	Royal Line	5	Robert Havlin	John Gosden	2:31.55
2020	Enable	6	Frankie Dettori	John Gosden	2:30.33
2021	Hamish	5	Pat Dobbs	William Haggas	2:34.53
2022	Mostahdaf	4	Dane O'Neill	John and Thady Gosden	2:34.44
2023	Bay Bridge	5	Richard Kingscote	Sir Michael Stoute	2:30.87
2024	Kalpana	3	P. J. McDonald	Andrew Balding	2:33.34
2025	Giavellotto	6	Oisin Murphy	Marco Botti	2:31.13
2026	Pride Of Arras	4	Rossa Ryan	Ralph Beckett	2:29.96

^{a} The 2005 running took place at Newmarket.

== See also ==
- Horse racing in Great Britain
- List of British flat horse races
