= 2015 Prix de l'Arc de Triomphe =

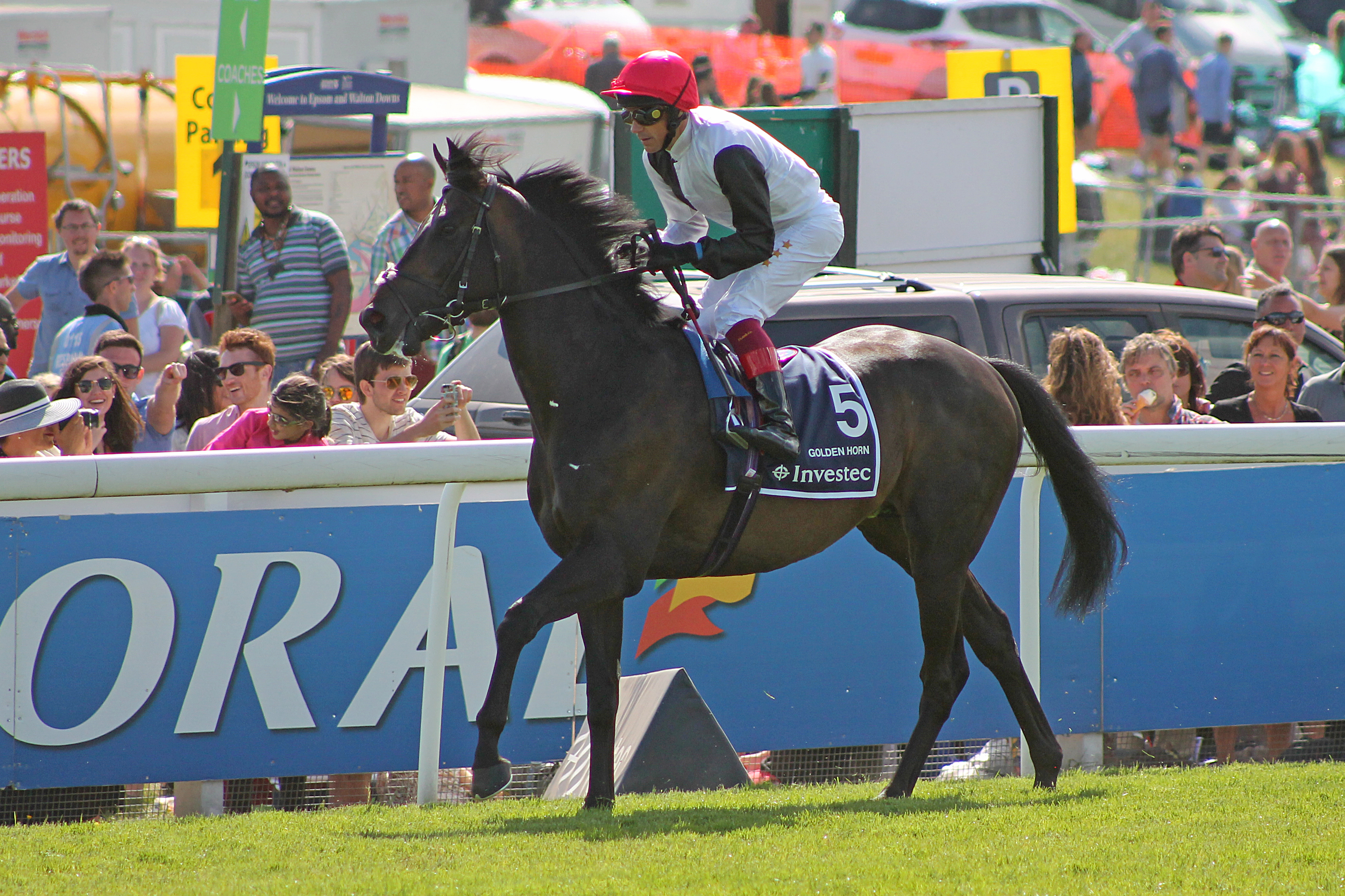
- Location: Longchamp Racecourse
- Date: October 4, 2015
- Winning horse: Golden Horn

The 2015 Prix de l'Arc de Triomphe was a horse race held at Longchamp on Sunday 4 October 2015. It was the 94th running of the Prix de l'Arc de Triomphe.

The winner was Anthony Oppenheimer's Golden Horn, a three-year-old colt trained in England by John Gosden and ridden by Frankie Dettori. Golden Horn's victory was the first in the race for his owner and trainer and was a record-equaling fourth success for Dettori. Golden Horn became the seventh winner of the Epsom Derby to win the Arc, following Sea Bird, Mill Reef, Lammtarra, Sinndar, Sea the Stars and Workforce.

== The contenders ==
The five-year-old mare Treve attempted to become the first horse to win the race three times after her successes in 2013 and 2014. She entered the race unbeaten in three races in 2015, including the Grand Prix de Saint-Cloud and the Prix Vermeille. Her main opposition seemed to come from two three-year-old colts: Golden Horn and New Bay. The British trained Golden Horn's wins had included the Epsom Derby, the Eclipse Stakes and the Irish Champion Stakes. New Bay had appeared to be the best middle-distance colt of his generation in France, winning the Prix du Jockey Club and the Prix Niel. Ireland was represented by Free Eagle (Prince of Wales's Stakes), Found (the top-rated filly of her generation in 2014) and Tapestry (Yorkshire Oaks). Apart from Golden Horn, the only other British challenger was Eagle Top who finished second in the King George VI and Queen Elizabeth Stakes. The other French contenders were Flintshire, Erupt (Grand Prix de Paris), Dolniya (Sheema Classic), Prince Gibraltar (Grosser Preis von Baden), Manatee (Grand Prix de Chantilly), Siljan's Saga (Grand Prix de Deauville), Silverwave (Prix La Force), Spiritjim (disqualified after winning the 2014 Grand Prix de Saint-Cloud), Frine (Prix de Royallieu) and Shahah (Prix d'Aumale) who was expected to act as a pacemaker for Treve. Meleagros was a non-runner. Treve was made the 9/10 favourite ahead of New Bay on 4.8/1 and Golden Horn on 5.2/1. Free Eagle (16.8/1) and Flintshire (18.6/1) were next in the betting ahead of Dolniya (27/1), Found (28/1) and Erupt (29/1).

== The race ==
Sahah fulfilled her expected role as a pacemaker, taking the lead soon after the start. Flintshire and New Bay were close behind, whilst Dettori took Golden Horn to the far outside before tracking right to drop in just behind the leader. Treve was among the backmarkers in the early stages along with Found. As the field entered the straight Golden Horn went to the front, opened up a clear advantage and won by two lengths. Flintshire stayed on to take second just ahead of New Bay and Treve.

== Race card ==
No	Horse	Weight (st–lb)	Jockey	Trainer	Owner	Draw
1	Flintshire (IRE)	9–05	Maxime Guyon	André Fabre	Khalid Abdullah	11
2	Eagle Top	9–05	William Buick	John Gosden (GB)	Carole Bamford	3
3	Manatee	9–05	Mickael Barzalona	André Fabre	Godolphin SNC	1
4	Meleagros	9–05	Adrien Fouassier	Alain Couetil	Denis Gorse	16
5	Prince Gibraltar	9–05	Fabrice Veron	Jean-Claude Rouget	Jean-François Gribomont	10
6	Spiritjim	9–05	Andrea Atzeni	Alain Couetil	Haras des Sablonnets et al.	18
7	Free Eagle	9–05	Pat Smullen	Dermot Weld (IRE)	Moyglare Stud	12
8	Dolniya	9–02	Christophe Soumillon	Alain de Royer-Dupré	HH Aga Khan	13
9	Treve	9–02	Thierry Jarnet	Criquette Head-Maarek	Al Shaqab Racing	8
10	Frine	9–02	Olivier Peslier	Carlos Laffon-Parias	Duke of Alburquerque	6
11	Siljan's Saga	9–02	Pierre-Charles Boudot	Jean-Pierre Gauvin	E Palluat De Besset & E Tassin	7
12	Tapestry	9–02	Joseph O'Brien	Aidan O'Brien (IRE)	Magnier, Tabor, Smith, Flaxman Holdings	9
13	New Bay	8–11	Vincent Cheminaud	André Fabre	Khalid Abdullah	5
14	Silverwave	8–11	James Doyle	Alain Couetil	Hspirit	17
15	Erupt	8–11	Stéphane Pasquier	Francis-Henri Graffard	Niarchos Family	4
16	Golden Horn	8–11	Frankie Dettori	John Gosden (GB)	Anthony Oppenheimer	14
17	Shahah	8–08	Gregory Benoist	Criquette Head-Maarek	Al Shaqab Racing	2
18	Found	8–08	Ryan Moore	Aidan O'Brien (IRE)	Tabor, Smith, Magnier	15

Trainers are based in France unless indicated.

== Full result ==
Pos.	Marg.	Horse	Age	Jockey	Trainer (Country)
1		Golden Horn	3	Frankie Dettori	John Gosden (GB)
2	2	Flintshire	5	Maxime Guyon	André Fabre (FR)
3	nk	New Bay	3	Vincent Cheminaud	André Fabre (FR)
4	nse	Treve	5	Thierry Jarnet	Criquette Head-Maarek (FR)
5	1½	Erupt	3	Stéphane Pasquier	Francis-Henri Graffard (FR)
6	nk	Free Eagle	4	Pat Smullen	Dermot Weld (IRE)
7	snk	Prince Gibraltar	4	Fabrice Veron	Jean-Claude Rouget (FR)
8	snk	Siljan's Saga	5	Pierre-Charles Boudot	J-P Gauvin (FR)
9	½	Found	3	Ryan Moore	Aidan O'Brien (IRE)
10	hd	Silverwave	3	James Doyle	Alain Couetil (FR)
11	2	Manatee	4	Mickael Barzalona	André Fabre (FR)
12	¾	Spiritjim	5	Andrea Atzeni	Alain Couetil (FR)
13	4	Dolniya	4	Christophe Soumillon	Alain de Royer-Dupré (FR)
14	¾	Frine	5	Olivier Peslier	Carlos Laffon-Parias (FR)
15	nk	Eagle Top	4	William Buick	John Gosden (GB)
16	15	Tapestry	4	Joseph O'Brien	Aidan O'Brien (IRE)
17	dist	Shahah	3	Gregory Benoist	Criquette Head-Maarek (FR)

- Abbreviations: ns = nose; shd = short-head; hd = head; snk = short neck; nk = neck

== Race details ==
- Sponsor: Qatar Racing and Equestrian Club
- Purse:5.000.000 €
- Going: Good
- Distance: 2,400 metres
- Number of runners: 17
- Winner's time: 2m 27.23s

== Subsequent breeding careers ==
Leading progeny of participants in the 2015 Prix de l'Arc de Triomphe.

=== Stallions ===
Free Eagle (6th) – Khalifa Sat (2nd Epsom Derby 2020), Justifier (1st Caravaggio Stakes 2019)
Golden Horn (1st) – West End Girl (1st Sweet Solera Stakes 2019)
New Bay (3rd) – Minor flat winners
Prince Gibraltar (7th) – Minor flat winners
Manatee (11th) – Offspring yet to race
Silverwave (10th) – Standing in France
Flintshire (2nd) – Exported to America – Offspring yet to race
Erupt (5th) – Exported to South Africa
Eagle Top (15th) – Exported to Czech Republic

=== Broodmares ===
Tapestry (16th) – Minor flat winner
Frine (14th) – Minor flat runner
Shahah (17th) – Minor flat runner
Treve (4th) – Offspring yet to race
Siljan's Saga (8th) – Offspring yet to race
Found (9th) – Offspring yet to race
Dolniya (13th) – Offspring yet to race
