= Zetland Stakes =

Flat horse race in Britain

- Class: Group 3
- Location: Rowley Mile; Newmarket, England
- Race type: Flat / Thoroughbred
- Sponsor: Godolphin
- Website: Newmarket

Race information
- Distance: 1m 2f (2,012 metres)
- Surface: Turf
- Track: Straight
- Qualification: Two-year-olds
- Weight: 9 st 4 lb Allowances; 5 lb for fillies 3Penalties; 5 lb for a Group 1 or 2 race win 3 lb for a Group 3 race win
- Purse: £65,000 (2025); 1st: £34,026

Zetland Stakes
2026
Drumbeat	Wykehurst Park	Apulia Bay

Previous years
2025
Pierre Bonnard	Endorsement	Del Maro
2024
Starzintheireyes	Green Storm	Shackleton
2023
Arabian Crown	Gasper De Lemos	Dallas Star
2022
Flying Honours	Blanchland	Dear My Friend
2021
Goldspur	Unconquerable	Hafit

2020-2011
2020
Lone Eagle	Recovery Run	Mystery Angel
2019
Max Vega	Miss Yoda	Berkshire Rocco
2018
Norway	I'll Have Another	Nate The Great
2017
Kew Gardens	Dee Ex Bee	Graffiti Master
2016
Coronet	Cunco	Permian
2015
Glamorous Approach	Landofhopeandglory	Move Up
2014
Crafty Choice	Captain Navarre	Murgan
2013
Hartnell	Montaly	Automated
2012
Restraint of Trade	Cap O'Rushes	Linguine
2011
Mojave	Repeater	Rougemont

2010-2001
2010
Indigo Way	Measuring Time	Picture Editor
2009
Take It To The Max	Anhar	Ted Spread
2008
Heliodor	Ouster	It's Dubai Dolly
2007
Twice Over	Planetarium	Stubbs Art
2006
Empire Day	Aaim To Prosper	Fashion Statement
2005
Under The Rainbow	Fiddlers Wood	Genre
2004
Ayam Zaman	Fantasy Ride	Natalie Jane
2003
Fun And Games	Cohn Blue	Carte Sauvage
2002
Forest Magic	Allergy	Wavertree Boy
2001
Alexander Three	Dusky Warbler	Bestam

2000-1991
2000
Worthily	Capal Garmon	Regatta Point
1999
Monte Carlo	Galleon Beach	Whitefoot
1998
Adnaan	Forest Shadow	Time Zone
1997
Trigger Happy	Night Rule	St Helensfield
1996
Silver Patriarch	Eldorado	Shadow Lead
1995
Gentilhomme	Weet-A-Minute	Polar Eclipse
1994
Double Eclipse	Royal Scimitar	Puck's Castle
1993
Double Trigger	Barbaroja	Brentwood
1992
Bob's Return	Bobbie Dee	Sharjah
1991
Bonny Scot	Captain Horatius	Beyton

1990-1988
1990
Matahif	Walim	Marcus Thorpe
1989
Rock Hopper	Access Sun	Laxey Bay
1988
Mamaluna	Prime Display	Artic Envoy

The Zetland Stakes is a Group 3 flat horse race in Great Britain open to two-year-old horses. It is run on the Rowley Mile at Newmarket over a distance of 1 mile and 2 furlongs (2,012 metres), and it is scheduled to take place each year in October.

The event was classed at Listed level until it became an ungraded conditions race in 2007. It returned to Listed level in 2015. It was previously run at Newmarket's last racing fixture of the year but was moved in 2015 to become part of the course's Future Champions Festival. It was upgraded again to Group 3 level from the 2019 running.

== Records ==
Leading jockey (4 wins):

- Ryan Moore - Under The Rainbow (2005), Indigo Way (2010), Kew Gardens (2017), Drumbeat (2026)

Leading trainer (5 wins):

- Mark Johnston – Double Trigger (1993), Double Eclipse (1994), Trigger Happy (1997), Empire Day (2006), Hartnell (2013)

== Winners ==
Year	Winner	Jockey	Trainer	Time
1969	Honorius	Lester Piggott	Jack Clayton	1:43.45
1970	Relate	Geoff Lewis	Noel Murless	2:12.27
1971	Freeby Boy	John Gorton	P Moore	2:12.06
1972	Piccolo Player	Philip Waldron	Ian Balding	2:12.17
1973	Court Dancer	Willie Carson	Paul Cole	2:12.95
1974	Shallow Stream	Geoff Lewis	Noel Murless	2:17.31
1975	Scallywag	Geoff Baxter	Bruce Hobbs	2:08.87
1976	Don't Touch	Tony Kimberley	Jeremy Hindley	2:15.67
1977	Crimson Beau	Philip Waldron	Paul Cole	2:06.25
1978	Halyudh	Frankie Durr	Scobie Breasley	2:12.53
1979	Many Moons	Joe Mercer	Henry Cecil	2:11.45
1980	Krug	Bruce Raymond	Michael Jarvis	2:12.21
1981	Paternoster Row	Geoff Baxter	Bruce Hobbs	2:10.75
1982	John French	Lester Piggott	Henry Cecil	2:12.39
1983	High Debate	Billy Newnes	Malcolm Jefferson	2:08.14
1984	Ulterior Motive	Willie Carson	John Dunlop	2:09.45
1985	Highland Chieftain	Joe Mercer	John Dunlop	2:04.65
1986	Grand Tour	Greville Starkey	William Hastings-Bass	2:15.40
1987	Upper Strata	Ray Cochrane	Luca Cumani	2:11.13
1988	Mamaluna	Greville Starkey	Guy Harwood	2:08.14
1989	Rock Hopper	Greville Starkey	Michael Stoute	2:07.63
1990	Matahif	Willie Carson	Robert Armstrong	2:05.66
1991	Bonny Scot	Michael Roberts	Luca Cumani	2:05.00
1992	Bob's Return	Philip Robinson	Mark Tompkins	2:06.55
1993	Double Trigger	Jason Weaver	Mark Johnston	2:07.84
1994	Double Eclipse	Jason Weaver	Mark Johnston	2:12.40
1995	Gentilhomme	Richard Quinn	Paul Cole	2:06.87
1996	Silver Patriarch	Pat Eddery	John Dunlop	2:07.53
1997	Trigger Happy	John Carroll	Mark Johnston	2:06.02
1998	Adnaan	Richard Hills	John Dunlop	2:14.78
1999	Monte Carlo	Dane O'Neill	Richard Hannon Sr.	2:11.93
2000	Worthily	John Reid	Mick Channon	2:16.79
2001	Alexander Three D	Michael Hills	Barry Hills	2:07.83
2002	Forest Magic	John Egan	Paul D'Arcy	2:10.96
2003	Fun and Games	Ted Durcan	Mick Channon	2:06.17
2004	Ayam Zaman	Philip Robinson	Michael Jarvis	2:10.53
2005	Under the Rainbow	Ryan Moore	Peter Chapple-Hyam	2:15.93
2006	Empire Day	Kevin Darley	Mark Johnston	2:07.03
2007	Twice Over	Richard Hughes	Henry Cecil	2:05.39
2008	Heliodor	Jimmy Fortune	Richard Hannon Sr.	2:12.40
2009	Take It to the Max	Jimmy Fortune	George M. Moore	2:07.57
2010	Indigo Way	Ryan Moore	Brian Meehan	2:09.65
2011	Mojave	Frankie Dettori	Mahmood Al Zarooni	2:04.99
2012	Restraint of Trade	Silvestre de Sousa	Mahmood Al Zarooni	2:09.69
2013	Hartnell	Joe Fanning	Mark Johnston	2:12.26
2014	Crafty Choice	Richard Hughes	Richard Hannon Sr.	2:10.61
2015	Glamorous Approach	Kevin Manning	Jim Bolger	2:07.08
2016	Coronet	Frankie Dettori	John Gosden	2:02.89
2017	Kew Gardens	Ryan Moore	Aidan O'Brien	2:02.76
2018	Norway	Seamie Heffernan	Aidan O'Brien	2:07.87
2019	Max Vega	Harry Bentley	Ralph Beckett	2:09.50
2020	Lone Eagle	Silvestre de Sousa	Martyn Meade	2:05.45
2021	Goldspur	James Doyle	Charlie Appleby	2:05.76
2022	Flying Honours	William Buick	Charlie Appleby	2:02.53
2023	Arabian Crown	William Buick	Charlie Appleby	2:05.93
2024	Starzintheireyes	Rossa Ryan	Ralph Beckett	2:07.03
2025	Pierre Bonnard	Christophe Soumillon	Aidan O'Brien	2:04.63
2026	Drumbeat	Ryan Moore	Aidan O'Brien	2:00.72

== See also ==
- Horse racing in Great Britain
- List of British flat horse races
