= Zabeel Prince =

Irish-bred racehorse

- Sire: Lope de Vega
- Grandsire: Shamardal
- Dam: Princess Serena
- Damsire: Unbridled's Song
- Sex: Gelding
- Foaled: 7 April 2013
- Country: Ireland
- Colour: Chestnut
- Breeder: Roundhill Stud
- Owner: Mohammed Obaid Al Maktoum
- Trainer: Roger Varian
- Record: 16: 6-2-0
- Earnings: £246,026

Major wins
- Doncaster Mile Stakes (2018); Earl of Sefton Stakes (2019); Prix d'Ispahan (2019)

Zabeel Prince (foaled 7 April 2013) is an Irish-bred, British-trained Thoroughbred racehorse. He was unraced as a juvenile and finished second on his only start at three. As a four-year-old he won a maiden race and two handicap races. In 2018 he won the Doncaster Mile Stakes in spring but missed most of the season before returning in autumn to finish second in the Joel Stakes. He reached his peak as a six-year-old in 2019 when he won the Group 3 Earl of Sefton Stakes and the Group 1 Prix d'Ispahan. He failed to win in three starts in 2020.

== Background ==
Zabeel Prince is a chestnut horse with a white sock on his right hind leg bred in Ireland by the County Limerick based Roundhill Stud. In December 2014 he was put up for auction at Tattersalls and was bought by the bloodstock agent Charlie Gordon-Watson for 325,000 guineas. He entered the ownership of Mohammed Obaid Al Maktoum and was sent into training with Luca Cumani in Newmarket, Suffolk. In September 2015 however, all of Mohammed Obaid Al Maktoum's horses were removed from Cumani's stable and transferred to the stable of Roger Varian.

He is from the second crop of foals sired by the Prix du Jockey Club winner Lope de Vega. His other foals have included Newspaperofrecord, Belardo, Phoenix of Spain, Vega Magic (Memsie Stakes) The Right Man (Al Quoz Sprint) and Santa Ana Lane (Stradbroke Handicap). Zabeel Prince's dam Princess Serena showed no racing ability, failing to win or place in five races, but did better as a broodmare as she produced Puissance de Lune who won the P B Lawrence Stakes Queen Elizabeth Stakes (VRC) and Blamey Stakes in Australia. Her dam Serena's Sister was, as her name suggests, a full-sister to Serena's Song.

== Racing career ==
=== 2016: three-year-old season ===
Zabeel Prince did not appear until the autumn of his three-year-old season when he contested maiden race over seven furlongs on soft ground at Redcar Racecourse on 24 October. Ridden by Andrea Atzeni, who became his regular jockey, he started 5/6 favourite but was beaten one and a quarter lengths into second place by Glorious Poet. Three weeks later, the colt was gelded.

=== 2017: four-year-old season ===
On his first appearance in 2017 Zabeel Prince started as the 11/8 second choice in the betting for a maiden race over one mile, seventy-five yards at Nottingham Racecourse on 29 June. He recorded his first success as he won by three lengths from the three-year-old favourite Cape of Cuba. For the rest of the season, the gelding competed in handicap races. On 20 September Zabeel Prince was assigned a weight of 134 in a handicap over one mile at Yarmouth Racecourse in which he was ridden as on his previous start by Atzeni. Starting the 8/11 favourite he took the lead a furlong out and drew away to win "very easily" by three and a half lengths. Silvestre de Sousa took the ride when the gelding started 15/8 favourite for a more valuable one-mile handicap at York Racecourse on 13 October and won "readily" by two and three quarter lengths under top weight of 133 pounds. Eight days later the gelding started second favourite for the Balmoral Handicap at Ascot Racecourse but after being in contention for most of the way he faded badly in the final furlong and came home eleventh of the twenty runners, beaten more than eight lengths by the winner Lord Glitters.

=== 2018: five-year-old season ===
Zabeel Prince began his third campaign with a step up in class for the Listed Doncaster Mile Stakes on 24 March in which he was partnered by Atzeni and started 10/11 favourite against five opponents. He led from the start and drew away from the field in the final furlong to win "comfortably" by two and a half lengths from Born To Be Alive. The gelding was moved up to the highest class for the Group 1 Lockinge Stakes at Newbury Racecourse on 19 May but made little impact and came home thirteenth of the fourteen runners behind Rhododendron. Zabeel Prince was off the track with injury until 28 September when he contested the Group 2 Joel Stakes at Newmarket Racecourse. Ridden by De Sousa he led for most of the way but was overtaken in the final furlong and beaten half a length by Mustashry.

=== 2019: six-year-old season ===
On his six-year-old debut, Zabeel Prince started 9/2 co-favourite alongside Elarqam (Somerville Tattersall Stakes) and Vintager for the Group 3 Earl of Sefton Stakes over nine furlongs at Newmarket on 18 April 2019. The other seven runners included Mustashry, Forest Ranger (winner of the race in 2018) and Robin of Navan (Critérium de Saint-Cloud). After being restrained by Atzeni in the early stages, he was switched to the outside, took the lead a furlong out and kept on well to win by two and three quarter lengths from Forest Ranger. After the race Varian said "We always thought he would get this sort of trip last year, but he got injured in the Lockinge and we couldn't run him until the autumn. The way he has won there he might get 10 furlongs. I loved the way Andrea rode him – he gave him a beautiful ride. He had to switch him as nothing was going forward in front of him. He hit the rising ground and came home really good... That performance has opened things up – the way he has got the trip – and I'd love to try him over 10 furlongs at some point. I think he needs time between races as he has a great record fresh."

On 26 May Zabeel Prince was sent to France to contest the Group 1 Prix d'Ispahan over 1800 metres at Longchamp Racecourse and started the 3/1 second favourite behind Wild Illusion in a nine-runner field which also included Study of Man (Prix du Jockey Club), Dream Castle (Jebel Hatta), With You (Prix Rothschild) and Intellogent (Prix Jean Prat). Zabeel Prince settled in third place alongside Dream Castle as Knight to Behold set the pace from Wild Illusion before producing a sustained run in the straight. He gained the advantage inside the last 200 metres and held off the late challenge of Study of Man to win by three quarters of a length. Atzeni commented "He stumbled coming out of the stalls and I had to chase him early on for a few strides. We didn't go too fast but he travelled nicely into the straight and did it well. Roger has been very patient with him and he's quite lightly raced. His form at Newmarket last time is working out brilliantly and I'm delighted for Sheikh Obaid... He picked up well again today and he never does a lot when he gets to the front, so I thought it was a good performance."

On 19 June Zabeel Prince was moved up in distance for the Prince of Wales's Stakes over ten furlongs on soft ground at Royal Ascot and came home seventh behind Crystal Ocean, Magical, Waldgeist, Hunting Horn, Sea of Class and Deirdre. In the Eclipse Stakes over the same distance at Sandown Park on 6 July he was in contention for most of the way but faded badly in the straight and finished last of the eight runners behind Enable. On 31 July the gelding was dropped back to one mile for the Sussex Stakes over one mile but again faded from contention in the closing stages and came home seventh behind the three-year-old Too Darn Hot. In August Varian announced that Zabeel Prince would not race again in 2019.

=== 2020: seven-year-old season ===
The 2020 flat racing season was disrupted by the COVID-19 pandemic and Zabeel Prince did not reappear until 11 July when he finished fifth behind Patrick Sarsfield when starting favourite for the Meld Stakes over nine furlongs at Leopardstown Racecourse. In the Strensall Stakes at York in August he came home fourth of nine runners behind Certain Lad, beaten two lengths by the winner. On his only other run that year he finished fifth behind Kameko, Regal Reality, Benbatl and Tilsit in the Joel Stakes at Newmarket on 25 September.

== Pedigree ==
Pedigree of Zabeel Prince (IRE), chestnut gelding, 2013
Sire Lope de Vega (IRE) 2007	Shamardal (USA); 2002	Giant's Causeway	Storm Cat
Sire Lope de Vega (IRE) 2007	Shamardal (USA); 2002	Giant's Causeway	Mariah's Storm
Sire Lope de Vega (IRE) 2007	Shamardal (USA); 2002	Helsinki (GB)	Machiavellian (USA)
Sire Lope de Vega (IRE) 2007	Shamardal (USA); 2002	Helsinki (GB)	Helen Street
Sire Lope de Vega (IRE) 2007	Lady Vettori (GB); 1997	Vettori (IRE)	Machiavellian (USA)
Sire Lope de Vega (IRE) 2007	Lady Vettori (GB); 1997	Vettori (IRE)	Air Distingue (USA)
Sire Lope de Vega (IRE) 2007	Lady Vettori (GB); 1997	Lady Golconda (FR)	Kendor
Sire Lope de Vega (IRE) 2007	Lady Vettori (GB); 1997	Lady Golconda (FR)	Lady Sharp
Dam Princess Serena (USA) 1999	Unbridled's Song (USA); 1993	Unbridled	Fappiano
Dam Princess Serena (USA) 1999	Unbridled's Song (USA); 1993	Unbridled	Gana Facil
Dam Princess Serena (USA) 1999	Unbridled's Song (USA); 1993	Trolley Song	Caro (IRE)
Dam Princess Serena (USA) 1999	Unbridled's Song (USA); 1993	Trolley Song	Lucky Spell
Dam Princess Serena (USA) 1999	Serena's Sister (USA); 1994	Rahy	Blushing Groom (FR)
Dam Princess Serena (USA) 1999	Serena's Sister (USA); 1994	Rahy	Glorious Song (CAN)
Dam Princess Serena (USA) 1999	Serena's Sister (USA); 1994	Imagining	Northfields
Dam Princess Serena (USA) 1999	Serena's Sister (USA); 1994	Imagining	Image Intesifier (Family: 7)

- Through his sire, Zabeel Prince was inbred 4 × 4 to Machiavellian, meaning that this stallion appears twice in the fourth generation of his pedigree.
