= Lucky Vega =

British-bred Thoroughbred racehorse

- Racing silks of Zhang Yuesheng
- Sire: Lope de Vega
- Grandsire: Shamardal
- Dam: Queen of Carthage
- Damsire: Cape Cross
- Sex: Colt
- Foaled: 27 February 2018
- Country: Ireland
- Colour: Bay
- Breeder: Kilcarn Stud
- Owner: Zhang Yuesheng
- Trainer: Jessica Harrington
- Record: 8: 2-3-1
- Earnings: £304,778

Major wins
- Phoenix Stakes (2020)

Lucky Vega (foaled 27 February 2018) is an Irish Thoroughbred racehorse. As a two-year-old in 2020 he won the Phoenix Stakes as well as finishing second in the Railway Stakes and the Middle Park Stakes. In the following year he ran third in the 2000 Guineas and third in the St James's Palace Stakes before being retired to become a breeding stallion.

== Background ==
Lucky Vega is a bay colt with a white star bred in Ireland by the County Meath-based Kilcarn Stud. As a foal in November 2018 he was consigned to the Goffs Sale where he was bought for €110,000 by Michael Roy. The colt was returned to the Goffs sales ring in 2019 for the Orby Sale and was sold for €175,000 to BBA Ireland and YuLong Investments. He entered the ownership of YuLong's founder Zhang Yuesheng and was sent into training with Jessica Harrington at Moone, County Kildare.

He was from the seventh crop of foals sired by the Prix du Jockey Club winner Lope de Vega whose other foals have included Phoenix of Spain, Newspaperofrecord, Belardo, Vega Magic (Memsie Stakes) The Right Man (Al Quoz Sprint) and Santa Ana Lane (Stradbroke Handicap). Lucky Vega's dam Queen of Carthage was an unraced daughter of the Prix de l'Opéra winner Satwa Queen.

== Racing career ==
=== 2020: two-year-old season ===
Lucky Vega made his racecourse debut in a maiden race over six furlongs on good to firm ground at Naas Racecourse on 8 June in which he was ridden by Shane Foley and started the 9/2 second favourite in an eighteen-runner field. After tracking the leaders he showed his inexperience as he hung to the left approaching the final furlong but kept on well to overtake the favoured Lipizzaner in the closing stages to win by half a length. For his next start, the colt was stepped up in class to contest the Group 2 Railway Stakes over the same distance on softer ground at the Curragh on 18 July and started the 3/1 second favourite. He lost his position entering the last quarter mile before staying on in the closing stages to finish second, beaten half a length by the 66/1 outsider Laws of Indices.

On 9 August, over the same course and distance, Lucky Vega was partnered by Foley in the Group 1 Phoenix Stakes and started the 4/1 second favourite behind the Aidan O'Brien-trained St Mark's Basilica. The other eight runners included Laws of Indices, Steel Bull (Molecomb Stakes), The Lir Jet (Norfolk Stakes), Ventura Tormenta (Prix Robert Papin) and Aloha Star (Airlie Stud Stakes). Lucky Vega raced just behind the leaders before taking the lead inside the final furlong and drawing away to win "easily" by three and a half lengths and a short head from Aloha Star and The Lir Jet. The placings of the second and third were reversed after a stewards' enquiry. Jessica Harrington said "He probably needed it the last day because he had won his maiden without getting into a battle. The last day, when he got into a bit of a battle, it just hardened him up. He was much more streetwise and, on his work at home, he had really started to come to himself".

At the Curragh on 13 September Lucky Vega was stepped up in distance for the National Stakes over seven furlongs and started the 2/1 joint-favourite in a ten-runner field. After racing in mid-division he was repeatedly blocked as he attempted to gain a clear run in the straight and came home fifth behind Thunder Moon, Wembley, St Mark's Basilica and Master of The Seas, beaten two and a half lengths by the winner. Two weeks later the colt was sent to England and started 5/2 favourite for the Group 1 Middle Park Stakes. He tracked the leaders before finishing strongly but failed by half a length to overhaul the front-running Supremacy.

In the official European classification of for 2020 Lucky Vega was given a rating of 116, making him the fifth best two-year-old of the season four pounds behind the top-rated St Mark's Basilica.

=== 2021: three-year-old season ===
Before the start of the 2021 season it was announced that Lucky Vega would stand as breeding stallion in Australia from August of that year.

For his first run of the season Lucky Vega contested the 2000 Guineas over the Rowley Mile at Newmarket on 1 May and started at odds of 12/1 in a fourteen runner field. He was in contention from the start and kept on strongly in the closing stages to take third place, beaten a short head and a neck by Poetic Flare and Master of The Seas in a closely-contested finish. Three weeks later the colt started 7/2 favourite for the Irish 2000 Guineas at the Curragh but after losing his position two furlongs out he came home fourth behind Mac Swiney, Poetic Flare and Van Gogh. At Royal Ascot on 15 June Lucky Vega started 4/1 favourite for the St James's Palace Stakes and finished second of the thirteen runners behind Poetic Flare.

== Stud career ==
As had been planned, Lucky Vega began his breeding career at the Yulong Stud in Australia in 2021. He was shuttled back to Europe to stand at the Irish National Stud for the 2022 Northern Hemisphere breeding season.

== Pedigree ==
Pedigree of Lucky Vega (IRE), bay colt, 2018
Sire Lope de Vega (IRE) 2007	Shamardal (USA); 2002	Giant's Causeway	Storm Cat
Sire Lope de Vega (IRE) 2007	Shamardal (USA); 2002	Giant's Causeway	Mariah's Storm
Sire Lope de Vega (IRE) 2007	Shamardal (USA); 2002	Helsinki (GB)	Machiavellian (USA)
Sire Lope de Vega (IRE) 2007	Shamardal (USA); 2002	Helsinki (GB)	Helen Street
Sire Lope de Vega (IRE) 2007	Lady Vettori (GB); 1997	Vettori (IRE)	Machiavellian (USA)
Sire Lope de Vega (IRE) 2007	Lady Vettori (GB); 1997	Vettori (IRE)	Air Distingue (USA)
Sire Lope de Vega (IRE) 2007	Lady Vettori (GB); 1997	Lady Golconda (FR)	Kendor
Sire Lope de Vega (IRE) 2007	Lady Vettori (GB); 1997	Lady Golconda (FR)	Lady Sharp
Dam Queen of Carthage (USA) 2009	Cape Cross (IRE); 1994	Green Desert (USA)	Danzig
Dam Queen of Carthage (USA) 2009	Cape Cross (IRE); 1994	Green Desert (USA)	Foreign Courier
Dam Queen of Carthage (USA) 2009	Cape Cross (IRE); 1994	Park Appeal	Ahonoora (GB)
Dam Queen of Carthage (USA) 2009	Cape Cross (IRE); 1994	Park Appeal	Balidaress
Dam Queen of Carthage (USA) 2009	Satwa Queen (FR); 2002	Muhtathir (GB)	Elmaamul (USA)
Dam Queen of Carthage (USA) 2009	Satwa Queen (FR); 2002	Muhtathir (GB)	Majmu (USA)
Dam Queen of Carthage (USA) 2009	Satwa Queen (FR); 2002	Tolga (USA)	Irish River (FR)
Dam Queen of Carthage (USA) 2009	Satwa Queen (FR); 2002	Tolga (USA)	Light of Realm (IRE) (Family: 10)

- Through his sire, Lucky Vega was inbred 4 × 4 to Machiavellian, meaning that this stallion appears twice in the fourth generation of his pedigree.
