= Doncaster Mile =

Doncaster Mile may refer to:

- Doncaster Handicap, a Group One horse race run at Randwick Racecourse, Australia
- Doncaster Mile Stakes, a Listed horse race run at Doncaster Racecourse, England
