= 2026 Epsom Derby =

247th running of the Epsom Derby horse race

- Epsom Derby
- Location: Epsom Downs Racecourse
- Date: 6 June 2026
- Winning horse: Christmas Day
- Starting price: 7–1
- Jockey: Ronan Whelan
- Trainer: Aidan O'Brien
- Owner: Derrick Smith, Susan Magnier, Michael Tabor, Georg von Opel, and Peter M. Brant
- Conditions: Soft

The 2026 Epsom Derby was the 247th annual running of the Derby horse race and took place at Epsom Downs Racecourse on 6 June 2026. The race was heavily affected by rainy weather, resulting in the winning time in the Derby being the slowest since 1983. Christmas Day won the race by 2.75 lengths over Maltese Cross, giving trainer Aidan O'Brien his 4th Derby victory in a row, and 12th overall.

== Full result ==
	Dist *	Horse	Jockey	Trainer	SP
1		Christmas Day	Ronan Whelan	Aidan O'Brien (IRE)	7/1
2	2¾	Maltese Cross	Tom Marquand	William Haggas	12/1
3	2½	James J Braddock	Dylan Browne McMonagle	Joseph Patrick O'Brien (IRE)	9/1
4	2	Bay of Brilliance	Hector Crouch	Ralph Beckett	9/1
5	nk	Alderman	Pat Dobbs	Richard Hannon Jr.	100/1
6	2½	Rebel Rocket	Rob Hornby	Faye Bramley	66/1
7	nk	Pierre Bonnard	Christophe Soumillon	Aidan O'Brien (IRE)	7/2
8	3	Ancient Egypt	David Egan	Charlie Johnston	100/1
9	13	Item	Colin Keane	Andrew Balding	11/2
Void	2¼	Benvenuto Cellini (Note: This horse was deemed a non runner after the race.)	Ryan Moore	Aidan O'Brien (IRE)
10	2¾	A Taste of Glory	Jamie Spencer	Andrew Balding	100/1
11	2¾	Balzac	Silvestre de Sousa	Jane Chapple-Hyam	66/1
12	9	Action	Wayne Lordan	Aidan O'Brien (IRE)	16/1
13	2¾	Poker	Ronan Scott	Karl Burke	80/1

* The distances between the horses are shown in lengths or shorter; hd = head, nk = neck.
† Trainers are based in Great Britain unless indicated.
