= Circus Maximus (horse) =

Irish Thoroughbred racehorse

- Racing silks of Flaxman Stables
- Sire: Galileo
- Grandsire: Sadler's Wells
- Dam: Duntle
- Damsire: Danehill Dancer
- Sex: Colt
- Foaled: 8 February 2016
- Country: Ireland
- Colour: Bay
- Breeder: Flaxman Stables Ireland Ltd
- Owner: Flaxman Stables, Susan Magnier, Michael Tabor & Derrick Smith
- Trainer: Aidan O'Brien
- Record: 17: 5-3-3
- Earnings: £1,481,438

Major wins
- Dee Stakes (2019); St James's Palace Stakes (2019); Prix du Moulin (2019); Queen Anne Stakes (2020)

Circus Maximus, (foaled 8 February 2016) is an Irish Thoroughbred racehorse. He showed promise as a juvenile in 2018 when he won one minor race and ran well in both the Autumn Stakes and the Vertem Futurity Trophy. In the following year he showed top class form over a mile, winning the Dee Stakes, St James's Palace Stakes and Prix du Moulin as well as finishing second in the Sussex Stakes. As a four-year-old he won the Queen Anne Stakes and finished second in both the Sussex Stakes and the Breeders' Cup Mile.

== Background ==
Circus Maximus is a bay horse with a small white star bred in Ireland by Flaxman Stables, a breeding company run by the Niarchos family. During his racing career he has been jointly owned by Flaxman Stables and the Coolmore Stud. He was sent into training with Aidan O'Brien at Ballydoyle.

He was sired by Galileo, who won the Derby, Irish Derby and King George VI and Queen Elizabeth Stakes in 2001. Galileo became one of the world's leading stallions, earning his tenth champion sire of Great Britain and Ireland title in 2018. His other progeny include Cape Blanco, Frankel, Golden Lilac, Nathaniel, New Approach, Rip Van Winkle, Found Minding and Ruler of the World. Circus Maximus's dam Duntle was a top-class performer who won five races including the Sandringham Handicap, Desmond Stakes, Amethyst Stakes and Duke of Cambridge Stakes. She was a female-line descendant of Lady Winborne, a half-sister to Allez France.

== Racing career ==
=== 2018: two-year-old season ===
On his racecourse debut Circus Maximus started the 5/1 favourite in a 23-runner field for a maiden race over seven furlongs at the Curragh on 26 August. Ridden by Ryan Moore he finished fifth, four and three quarter lengths behind the winner Breaking Story, after being hampered in the last quarter mile. On 22 September at Gowran Park the colt was partnered by his trainer's son Donnacha O'Brien in a maiden over one mile on heavy ground and recorded his first victory as he came home two lengths clear of the Ger Lyons trained Army Recruit despite hanging badly to the left in the closing stages. The colt was then sent to England and stepped up in class for the Group 3 Autumn Stakes at Newmarket Racecourse on 13 October and Donnacha O'Brien partnering the stable's best fancied contender Magna Grecia the ride on Circus Maximus went to Seamie Heffernan. After briefly taking the lead a furlong out he was outpaced in the closing stages and finished third behind Persian King and Magna Grecia. Two weeks later Circus Maximus was promoted to Group 1 level when he was one three O'Brien trainees to contest the Vertem Futurity Trophy over one mile at Doncaster Racecourse. Ridden by Wayne Lordan he ran fourth behind Magna Grecia, Phoenix of Spain and Western Australia, beaten a length by the winner after hanging left in the closing stages.

=== 2019: three-year-old season ===
Circus Maximus began his three-year-old season by starting the 5/4 favourite for the Dee Stakes (a trial race for the Epsom Derby) over 10 1/2 furlongs at Chester Racecourse on 9 May. Partnered by Moore he took the lead approaching the last quarter mile and despite hanging left yet again he kept on well to win by a length and a quarter from his stablemate Mohawk. Aidan O'Brien commented "Ryan said he was very happy at a mile-and-a-quarter but he wouldn’t mind stepping up if he needed it... this horse could be a Derby possible... He's lazy, but they're better being a little bit lazy than over-racing." In the 2019 Epsom Derby over 1 1/2 miles on 1 June the colt was partnered by Frankie Dettori and went off the 10/1 sixth choice in a thirteen-runner field. He stumbled at the start but recovered to settle in fourth place but was unable to quicken in the last quarter mile and was eased down by Dettori to come home sixth behind his stablemate Anthony Van Dyck.

On 18 June Circus Maximus, equipped with blinkers for the first time, was dropped back in distance for the Group 1 St James's Palace Stakes over one mile at Royal Ascot when he was ridden by Moore and started at 10/1. Too Darn Hot was made favourite, while the other nine runners included Phoenix of Spain, King of Comedy (Heron Stakes), Skardu (Craven Stakes), Shaman (Prix La Force) and Royal Marine. Racing in heavy rain, Circus Maximus broke quickly and settled in second place behind Fox Champion before taking the lead in the straight. He saw off the challenges of Phoenix of Spain and Too Darn Hot before denying a late charge from King of Comedy on the wide outside to win by a neck. After the race O'Brien explained that the colt had not originally been intended to run in the race and had only been entered when his owners paid a supplementary fee of £45,000 fifteen minutes before the deadline earlier that week. He went on to say "It was a big challenge for the horse. We were worried that the pace was going to be completely different over a mile. We just put the blinkers on him just to sharpen him a little bit. He needed to be focused very quick and he didn't have a lot of time to learn about it".

Circus Maximus was matched against older horses in the Sussex Stakes at Goodwood Racecourse on 31 July. After tracking the front-running Phoenix of Spain he took the lead in the straight but was overtaken by Too Darn Hot and beaten half a length into second place. In the International Stakes over 10 1/2 furlongs at York Racecourse three weeks later, Circus Maximus set the pace before fading in the last quarter mile and coming home seventh behind his stablemate Japan. On 9 September the colt was sent to France and went off at odds of 4.1/1 for the Prix du Moulin over 1600 metres at Longchamp Racecourse. Romanised headed the betting after winning the Prix Jacques Le Marois while the other eight runners included Olmedo (Poule d'Essai des Poulains), Line of Duty (Breeders' Cup Juvenile Turf) and Phoenix of Spain. After racing in third place Circus Maximus moved up to dispute the lead 200 metres from the finish and got the better of a closely contested struggle with Romanised to win by a nose. Circus Maximus hung to the left in the closing stages and slightly impeded the runner-up but after an inquiry by the racecourse stewards the result was allowed to stand. Ryan Moore commented "He was the best horse on the day and was always holding off the second. He had a bit more left in the tank. He's obviously well suited to a mile. There were six group 1 winners in the field and you have to be very happy with what he's done." An appeal by Romanised's connections failed to overturn the decision.

For his final run of the year Circus Maximus was sent to California to contest the Breeders' Cup Mile at Santa Anita Park on 1 November and started joint-favourite alongside the four-year-old filly Got Stormy. He recovered from a poor start and stayed on well in the straight but never looked likely to win and came home fourth behind Uni, Got Stormy, and Without Parole.

=== 2020: four-year-old season ===
The flat racing season in Britain and Ireland was restructured as a result of the COVID-19 pandemic and Circus Maximus made his first appearance in the Queen Anne Stakes which was run behind closed doors at Royal Ascot on 16 June. With Moore in the saddle he went off the 4/1 favourite in a fifteen-runner field which also included Mustashry, Billesdon Brook, Accidental Agent, Terebellum (Prix de la Nonette), Mohaather, Skardu (Craven Stakes), Plumatic (Prix du Muguet) and Duke of Hazzard (Celebration Mile). After tracking the 40/1 outsider Marie's Diamond, Circus Maximus took the lead approaching the final furlong before being overtaken by the filly Terebellum but rallied to regain the advantage in the final strides and won by a head. Aidan O'Brien, watching the race from his training base in Ireland commented "That's him exactly. He's like a fighter. If he doesn't get his blood up then he doesn't perform. He can be quite lazy so he needs the fast tempo of a mile. He loves getting eyeballed. He's a very good horse. He is very tough, he travels, quickens, and then toughs it out."

On 29 July Circus Maximus made his second attempt to win the Sussex Stakes at Goodwood and led from the start and maintained his advantage into the straight but was overtaken by Mohaather in the final strides and beaten three quarters of a length into second place. He reappeared for the Prix Jacques le Marois over 1600 metres on heavy ground at Deauville Racecourse on 16 August and came home third behind the three-year-olds Palace Pier and Alpine Star. In the following month he attempted to repeat his 2019 success in the Prix du Moulin but ran third to Persian King and Pinatubo after leading the field until the last quarter mile. In the Queen Elizabeth II Stakes at Ascot in October he never looked likely to win and came home tenth of the fourteen runners behind The Revenant after fading badly in the closing stages. On his final racecourse appearance Circus Maximus was sent to the United States for a second run in the Breeders' Cup Mile which was run that year at Keeneland on 7 November. He raced in mid-division before finishing strongly, but after briefly struggling to obtain a clear run in the straight he failed by a neck to overhaul his less fancied stablemate Order of Australia.

In the 2020 World's Best Racehorse Rankings, Circus Maximus was rated on 120, making him the equal 40th best racehorse in the world.

== Stud career ==
Five days after his run at Keeneland, it was announced that Circus Maximus would be retired from racing at the end of the year and would stand as a breeding stallion at the Coolmore Stud at an initial fee of £20,000. Aidan O'Brien commented "Circus Maximus is very tough and travels with a lot of speed. He's that type of horse that can often make very good stallions. We'll definitely be breeding to him."

He also shuttled to Windsor Park Stud in Waikato, New Zealand. His 2025 Service fee was set at $17,500 + GST (LFG).

=== Notable progeny ===
Circus Maximus sired Road To Paris, the 2026 New Zealand Derby winner.

In his first New Zealand crop he also sired:

- Circus Dancer (NZ), winner of the O'Leary's Fillies Stakes (a listed race over 1340m
- Towering Vision (NZ), winner of the Waikato Equine Veterinary Stakes (listed 1400m).

== Pedigree ==
Pedigree of Circus Maximus (IRE), bay colt, 2016
Sire Galileo (IRE) 1998	Sadler's Wells (USA); 1981	Northern Dancer	Nearctic
Sire Galileo (IRE) 1998	Sadler's Wells (USA); 1981	Northern Dancer	Natalma
Sire Galileo (IRE) 1998	Sadler's Wells (USA); 1981	Fairy Bridge	Bold Reason
Sire Galileo (IRE) 1998	Sadler's Wells (USA); 1981	Fairy Bridge	Special
Sire Galileo (IRE) 1998	Urban Sea (USA) ch. 1989	Miswaki	Mr. Prospector
Sire Galileo (IRE) 1998	Urban Sea (USA) ch. 1989	Miswaki	Hopespringseternal
Sire Galileo (IRE) 1998	Urban Sea (USA) ch. 1989	Allegretta	Lombard
Sire Galileo (IRE) 1998	Urban Sea (USA) ch. 1989	Allegretta	Anatevka
Dam Duntle (IRE) 2009	Danehill Dancer (IRE); 1993	Danehill (USA)	Danzig
Dam Duntle (IRE) 2009	Danehill Dancer (IRE); 1993	Danehill (USA)	Razyana
Dam Duntle (IRE) 2009	Danehill Dancer (IRE); 1993	Mira Adonde (USA)	Sharpen Up (GB)
Dam Duntle (IRE) 2009	Danehill Dancer (IRE); 1993	Mira Adonde (USA)	Lettre d'Amour
Dam Duntle (IRE) 2009	Lady Angola (USA); 1998	Lord At War (ARG)	General (FR)
Dam Duntle (IRE) 2009	Lady Angola (USA); 1998	Lord At War (ARG)	Luna de Miel
Dam Duntle (IRE) 2009	Lady Angola (USA); 1998	Behguela	Little Current
Dam Duntle (IRE) 2009	Lady Angola (USA); 1998	Behguela	Lady Winborne (Family 1-x)
