= Eyrefield Stakes =

Flat horse race in Ireland

- Class: Group 3
- Location: Leopardstown; County Dublin, Ireland
- Race type: Flat / Thoroughbred
- Website: Leopardstown

Race information
- Distance: 1m 1f (1,811 metres)
- Surface: Turf
- Track: Left-handed
- Qualification: Two-year-olds
- Weight: 9 st 3 lb Allowances; 3 lb for fillies Penalties; 7 lb for Group 1 winners 5 lb for Group 2 win or 2 Group 3 wins 3 lb for Group 3 winners
- Purse: €50,000 (2020); 1st: €29,500

Eyrefield Stakes
2026
Wall Street	Zarak Pasha	Leadlight

Previous years
2025
Christmas Day	A Boy Named Susie	Port Of Spain
2024
Sigh No More	Trinity College	Wemightakedlongway
2023
Grosvenor Square	Cambridge	Zaphod
2022
Speirling Beag	Hiawatha	Village Voice
2021
Duke De Sessa	Piz Badile	Anchorage

2020-2011
2020
Flying Visit	Wuqood	Carlisle Bay
2019
Degraves	Persia	Justifier
2018
Guaranteed	Masaff	Sovereign
2017
Flag Of Honour	Giuseppe Garibaldi	Hazapour
2016
Dubai Sand	Diodorus	Youarewonder
2015
Moonlight Magic	Landofhopeandglory	Leafy Shade
2014
Parish Boy	Order Of St George	Zafilani
2013
Mekong River	Achnaha	Mandatario
2012
Sugar Boy	Coolibah	Cest Notre Gris
2011
Call To Battle	Alla Speranza	Tower Rock

2010-2001
2010
Tiz The Shot	Obligation	Banksters Bonus
2009
Mikhail Glinka	What A Charm	Marfach
2008
Mourayan	Oh Goodness Me	Aristocrat
2007
Alessandro Volta	The Fist Of God	Dick Morris
2006
Anton Chekhov	Star Inside	Luminous One
2005
Wovoka	Danehill Music	Royal Intrigue
2004
Yehudi	Imperial Brief	In The Ribbons
2003
Mikado	Tarakala	Liss Ard
2002
Yesterday	Eklim	Snippets
2001
On The Nile	Wrong Key	Arkaga

2000-1991
2000
Vinnie Roe	Rebelline	Karsavina
1999
Chiang Mai	Homer	Quality Team
1998
Wild Heaven	Port Bayou	Morning Breeze
1997
Andy Dufresne	Chenille	Crystal Wind
1996
Strawberry Roan	Buddy Marvel	Mingling Glances
1995
Deynawari	Ceirseach	Slightly Speedy
1994
Humbel	Fill The Bill	Bluffing
1993
City Nights	New Tribe	Metroella
1992
Sinissipi	Desert Team	Arabic Treasure
1991
Fawaayid	Arrikala	Mr Boal

1990-1988
1990
Enzo	Favoured Nations	Duharra
1989
Catch Twenty Two	Annie Laurie	Daylight Hour
1988
Beyond The Lake	Prince Lyphard	My Corncrake

The Eyrefield Stakes is a Group 3 flat horse race in Ireland open to two-year-old thoroughbreds. It is run at Leopardstown over a distance of 1 mile and 1 furlong (1,811 metres), and it is scheduled to take place each year in October or November.

The event was formerly titled the Old Connell Race, and it used to be held at the Curragh. It became known as the Eyrefield Race in 1990. It was transferred to Leopardstown in 1995, and from this point it was called the Eyrefield Stakes. It was upgraded from Listed to Group 3 status in 2017.

== Records ==
Leading jockey since 1988 (6 wins):

- Michael Kinane – Beyond the Lake (1988), Sinissipi (1992), On the Nile (2001), Yesterday (2002), Mikado (2003), Mourayan (2008)

Leading trainer since 1988 (14 wins):

- Aidan O'Brien – Strawberry Roan (1996), Chiang Mai (1999), On the Nile (2001), Yesterday (2002), Mikado (2003), Yehudi (2004), Anton Chekhov (2006), Alessandro Volta (2007), Mikhail Glinka (2009), Mekong River (2013), Flag Of Honour (2017), Grosvenor Square (2023), Christmas Day (2025), Wall Street (2026)

== Winners since 1988 ==
Year	Winner	Jockey	Trainer	Time
1988	Beyond the Lake	Michael Kinane	Dermot Weld	2:10.80
1989	Catch Twenty Two	Pat Shanahan	Michael Kauntze	2:08.40
1990	Enzo	Christy Roche	Jim Bolger	1:56.40
1991	Fawaayid	Christy Roche	Jim Bolger	1:58.00
1992	Sinissipi	Michael Kinane	John Oxx	1:59.50
1993	City Nights	Pat Shanahan	Dermot Weld	2:00.70
1994	Humbel	Pat Shanahan	Dermot Weld	2:05.30
1995	Deynawari	Johnny Murtagh	John Oxx	2:00.20
1996	Strawberry Roan	Christy Roche	Aidan O'Brien	1:58.20
1997	Andy Dufresne	Kevin Darley	Ted Walsh	2:06.90
1998	Wild Heaven	Micky Fenton	Charles O'Brien	2:08.70
1999	Chiang Mai	Jamie Spencer	Aidan O'Brien	2:05.80
2000	Vinnie Roe	Pat Smullen	Dermot Weld	2:02.10
2001	On the Nile	Michael Kinane	Aidan O'Brien	2:02.60
2002	Yesterday	Michael Kinane	Aidan O'Brien	2:01.20
2003	Mikado	Michael Kinane	Aidan O'Brien
2004	Yehudi	Jamie Spencer	Aidan O'Brien	2:02.20
2005	Wovoka	Tony Culhane	Mick Channon	2:04.10
2006	Anton Chekhov	Colm O'Donoghue	Aidan O'Brien	1:59.00
2007	Alessandro Volta	Seamie Heffernan	Aidan O'Brien	1:54.91
2008	Mourayan	Michael Kinane	John Oxx	2:02.86
2009	Mikhail Glinka	Seamie Heffernan	Aidan O'Brien	2:01.49
2010	Tiz the Shot	Declan McDonogh	Kevin Prendergast	2:02.93
2011	Call to Battle	Johnny Murtagh	John Oxx	1:58.38
2012	Sugar Boy	Chris Hayes	Patrick Prendergast	2:02.21
2013	Mekong River	Seamie Heffernan	Aidan O'Brien	1:54.43
2014	Parish Boy	Kevin Manning	Jim Bolger	1:54.38
2015	Moonlight Magic	Kevin Manning	Jim Bolger	2:01.05
2016	Dubai Sand	Kevin Manning	Jim Bolger	1:56.81
2017	Flag Of Honour	Padraig Beggy	Aidan O'Brien	2:04.79
2018	Guaranteed	Kevin Manning	Jim Bolger	1:54.94
2019	Degraves	Shane Crosse	Joseph O'Brien	2:09.32
2020	Flying Visit	Luke McAteer	Jim Bolger	2:03.64
2021	Duke De Sessa	Colin Keane	Dermot Weld	1:56.74
2022	Speirling Beag	Rory Cleary	Jim Bolger	2:03.05
2023	Grosvenor Square	Seamie Heffernan	Aidan O'Brien	2:07.50
2024	Sigh No More	Mikey Sheehy	Joseph O'Brien	1:59.17
2025	Christmas Day	Jack Cleary	Aidan O'Brien	1:56.71
2026	Wall Street	Wayne Lordan	Aidan O'Brien	1:55.62

== See also ==
- Horse racing in Ireland
- List of Irish flat horse races
