= Christmas Day (horse) =

Irish Thoroughbred racehorse

- Racing silks of Susan Magnier
- Sire: Camelot
- Grandsire: Montjeu
- Dam: Beauly
- Damsire: Sea the Stars
- Sex: Colt
- Foaled: 22 February 2023
- Country: Ireland
- Colour: Bay
- Breeder: Framont Ltd.
- Owner: Magnier, Smith, Tabor, Westerberg, & Brant
- Trainer: Aidan O'Brien
- Record: 9: 4-1-3

Major wins
- Eyrefield Stakes (2025); Ballysax Stakes (2026); Epsom Derby (2026)
- Last updated on 2 August 2026

Christmas Day (foaled 22 February 2023) is an Irish Thoroughbred racehorse. He took victories in the Group 3 Eyrefield Stakes and Ballysax Stakes before taking victory in the Derby in 2026.

== Background ==
Christmas Day is a bay colt bred in Ireland by Framont Ltd. He is owned by a partnership of owners consisting of Magnier, Smith, Tabor, Westerberg and Brant. He is trained by Aidan O'Brien.

Christmas Day is sired by Camelot, a winner of two legs of the English Triple Crown. His dam is Beauly, who is a daughter of the highly successful Sea the Stars.

== Career ==
=== 2025: two-year-old season ===
Christmas Day made his racing debut on 2 August 2025 at Gallway in a 1-mile & 73 yard race, where he finished in third. His next race was another maiden race at a distance of 1 mile & 1 furlong, this time at Tipperary on 31 August. Christmas Day finished only fifth in a field of 12. His next race was a 1-mile race at Gowran Park on 20 September. In heavy going, he took his first race win.

Christmas Day's first significant stakes entry was at the Group-3 Eyrefield Stakes. Christmas Day went off with 13/2 SP and charged to the lead in the final furlong to take his first major win.

=== 2026: three-year-old season ===
After being rested for the winter, Christmas Day returned to racing in April 2026 at the Group 3 Ballysax Stakes. He once again pushed into the lead in the final furlong to take another race victory. In May, he was entered into the Dante Stakes, marking his first race start outside of Ireland. He finished third.

Christmas Day was next entered into the Derby, marking the most significant start of his career. He entered with 7/1 SP. In soft conditions and driving rain, he was taken to victory by 2 3/4 lengths. The win was a record-extending 15th Derby win for trainer Aidan O'Brien but the first for his jockey Ronan Whelan Christmas Day next ran in the Irish Derby, where he finished second, being defeated by his stablemate Benvenuto Cellini.

== Statistics ==
Racing form based on Racing Post.

Date	Distance	Race	Grade/ Group	Track	Odds	Field	Finish	Winning Time	Winning (Losing) Margin	Winner (2nd place)	Jockey	Ref
2025 – two-year-old season
2 Aug 2025	1m 73y	Maiden		Galway	11/2	9	3rd	1:48.69	(5 3/4 lengths)	Action	Jack Cleary	
31 Aug 2025	1m 1f	Maiden		Tipperary	5/1	12	5th	2:01.35	(6 1/4 lengths)	Endorsement	Jack Cleary	
20 Sep 2025	1m	Maiden		Gowran Park	6/4*	9	1st	1:46.48	1/2 length	(Hedjet)	Wayne Lordan	
18 Oct 2025	1m 1f	Eyrefield Stakes	III	Leopardstown	13/2	8	1st	1:56.71	Short head	(A Boy Named Susie)	Jack Cleary	
2026 – three-year-old season
12 Apr 2026	1m 2f	Ballysax Stakes	III	Leopardstown	11/1	9	1st	2:12.76	1/2 length	(Endorsement)	Wayne Lordan	
14 May 2026	1m 2f 56y	Dante Stakes	II	York	11/4*	8	3rd	2:10.80	(4 1/2 lengths)	Item	Ryan Moore	
6 Jun 2026	1m 4f 6y	Epsom Derby	I	Epsom Downs	7/1	14	1st	2:43.75	2 3/4 lengths	(Maltese Cross)	Ronan Whelan	
28 Jun 2026	1m 4f	Irish Derby	I	The Curragh	4/1	8	2nd	2:28.33	(1 3/4 lengths)	Benvenuto Cellini	Ronan Whelan	
19 Aug 2026	1m 3f 188y	Great Voltigeur Stakes	II	York	9/4	6	3rd	2:32.04	(4 1/4 lengths)	Maltese Cross	Ryan Moore	

Notes:
An (*) asterisk after the odds means Christmas Day was the post-time favourite.

== Pedigree ==
Pedigree of Christmas Day (IRE), bay colt, 2023
Sire Camelot (GB) 2013	Montjeu; 1996	Sadler's Wells (USA)	Northern Dancer (CAN)
Sire Camelot (GB) 2013	Montjeu; 1996	Sadler's Wells (USA)	Fairy Bridge (USA)
Sire Camelot (GB) 2013	Montjeu; 1996	Floripedes (FR)	Top Ville
Sire Camelot (GB) 2013	Montjeu; 1996	Floripedes (FR)	Toute Cy (FR)
Sire Camelot (GB) 2013	Tarfah (USA); 2001	Kingmambo (USA)	Mr. Prospector (USA)
Sire Camelot (GB) 2013	Tarfah (USA); 2001	Kingmambo (USA)	Miesque (USA)
Sire Camelot (GB) 2013	Tarfah (USA); 2001	Fickle (GB)	Danehill (USA)
Sire Camelot (GB) 2013	Tarfah (USA); 2001	Fickle (GB)	Fade (GB)
Dam Beauly (GB) 2005	Sea the Stars; 2006	Cape Cross	Green Desert (USA)
Dam Beauly (GB) 2005	Sea the Stars; 2006	Cape Cross	Park Appeal
Dam Beauly (GB) 2005	Sea the Stars; 2006	Urban Sea (USA)	Miswaki
Dam Beauly (GB) 2005	Sea the Stars; 2006	Urban Sea (USA)	Allegretta (GB)
Dam Beauly (GB) 2005	Pickle (GB); 2001	Piccolo (GB)	Warning (GB)
Dam Beauly (GB) 2005	Pickle (GB); 2001	Piccolo (GB)	Woodwind (FR)
Dam Beauly (GB) 2005	Pickle (GB); 2001	Crackle (GB)	Anshan (GB)
Dam Beauly (GB) 2005	Pickle (GB); 2001	Crackle (GB)	Crackling (GB) (Family 14-c)
