= Phoenix of Spain =

Irish-bred Thoroughbred racehorse

- Racing silks of Tony Wechsler & Ann Plummer
- Sire: Lope de Vega
- Grandsire: Shamardal
- Dam: Lucky Clio
- Damsire: Key of Luck
- Sex: Colt
- Foaled: 17 February 2016
- Country: Ireland
- Colour: Grey
- Breeder: Cherry Faeste
- Owner: Tony Wechsler & Ann Plummer
- Trainer: Charles Hills
- Record: 10: 3-2-0
- Earnings: £368,804

Major wins
- Acomb Stakes (2018); Irish 2000 Guineas (2019)

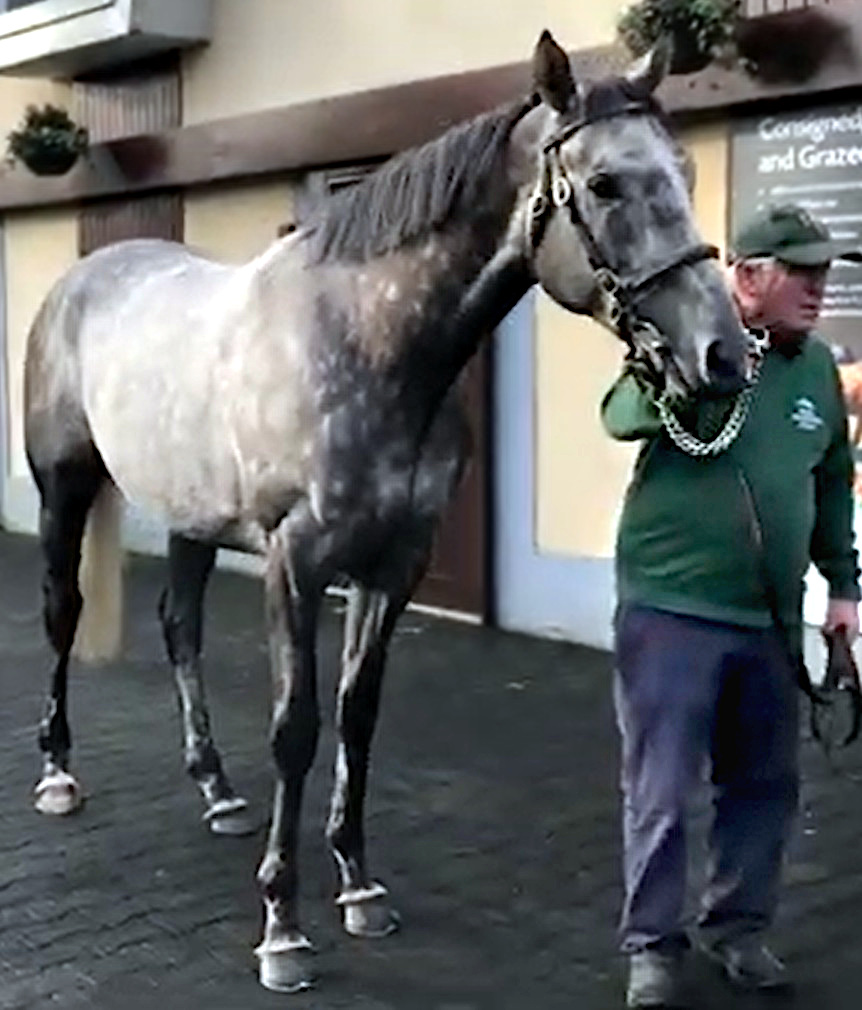
Phoenix Of Spain in 2020

Phoenix of Spain (foaled 17 February 2016) is an Irish-bred, British-trained Thoroughbred racehorse. As a two-year-old in 2018 he showed top-class form to win two races including the Acomb Stakes as well as finishing second in both the Champagne Stakes and the Vertem Futurity Trophy. He recorded his greatest success on his first run of 2019 when he easily defeated a strong field to take the Irish 2000 Guineas. He failed to reproduce his best form in four subsequent starts and was retired from racing at the end of the year.

== Background ==
Phoenix of Spain is a grey colt bred in Ireland by Cherry Faeste. As a foal in December 2016 he was offered for sale at Tattersalls and was bought for 78,000 guineas by Good Will Bloodstock. He returned to the Tattersalls sale ring in October 2017 and was sold to Howson & Houldsworth Bloodstock for 220,000 guineas. The colt entered the ownership of Tony Wechsler and Ann Plummer and was sent into training with Charles Hills at Lambourn in Berkshire. He was ridden in seven of his ten races by Jamie Spencer.

He is from the fifth crop of foals sired by the Prix du Jockey Club winner Lope de Vega. His other foals have included Newspaperofrecord, Belardo, Vega Magic (Memsie Stakes) The Right Man (Al Quoz Sprint) and Santa Ana Lane (Stradbroke Handicap). Phoenix of Spain's dam Lucky Clio showed no racing ability, failing to win in five starts, but did better as a broodmare, producing six other winners. She was distantly descended from La Faisanderie, a full sister to Slieve Gallion.

== Racing career ==
=== 2018: two-year-old season ===
On 6 July 2018 Phoenix of Spain began his racing career in a novice race (for horses with no more than two previous wins) over seven furlongs at Sandown Park for which he started a 16/1 outsider and came home fourth behind the John Gosden-trained King of Comedy. Later that month in a similar event on the Tapeta surface at Wolverhampton Racecourse the colt was ridden by Callum Shepherd and started the 6/5 favourite against six opponents. After tracking the leaders he went to the front a furlong out and recorded his first success as he won "comfortably" by two and a half lengths. He was then stepped up in class for the Group 3 Acomb Stakes at York Racecourse on 22 August and started at odds of 9/2 in an eight-runner field. Phoenix of Spain was restrained towards the rear by Spencer before taking the lead a furlong out and winning by one and a half lengths from the favourite Watan. After the race Charles Hills said: "He was impressive at Wolverhampton and we felt York would suit him better. I thought Jamie gave him a great ride. He was a bit windy beforehand and he settled him well... You'd like to think a mile would be within his compass this season".

James Doyle took the ride when Phoenix of Spain contested the Group 2 Champagne Stakes on 15 September at Doncaster Racecourse. He raced in third place and kept on well in the closing stages to finish second of the six runners, beaten one and a quarter lengths by the odds-on favourite Too Darn Hot. The colt returned to the same track on 27 October when he was moved up in class and distance for the Vertem Futurity Trophy over one mile and went off the 11/2 third choice in the betting. Phoenix of Spain came from well off the pace to dispute the lead inside the final furlong, but after being hampered in the closing stages he finished second in a blanket finish, beaten a head by Magna Grecia with Western Australia, Circus Maximus and Great Scot close behind.

In the official ratings of European juveniles for 2018 Phoenix of Spain was given a mark of 112, making him the fourteen pounds inferior to the top-rated Too Darn Hot.

=== 2019: three-year-old season ===
For his three-year-old debut Phoenix of Spain was sent to Ireland to contest the Irish 2000 Guineas at the Curragh on 25 May and went off at odds of 16/1. Too Darn Hot and Magna Grecia started joint favourites while the other eleven runners included Skardu (Craven Stakes), Mohawk (Royal Lodge Stakes), Shelir (Tetrarch Stakes), Emaraaty Ana (Gimcrack Stakes) and Van Beethoven (Railway Stakes). Phoenix of Spain led from the start, opened up a clear advantage approaching the final furlong and came home three lengths clear of Too Darn Hot in second place. Charles Hills said "The plan wasn’t really to make the running, but Jamie gave him an absolute peach and he’s some horse. He sustained that gallop all the way through and he just keep lengthening. He’s a big horse and whatever he did last year was a bonus. He’s got a hell of a future ahead of him".

In June at Royal Ascot Phoenix of Spain started 5/2 second favourite for the St James's Palace Stakes but after racing in third place for most of the way he made no impression in the closing stages and finished sixth of the nine runners behind Circus Maximus. At Goodwood Racecourse on 31 July the colt was matched against older horses for the first time in the Sussex Stakes. He led for most of the way before fading in the last quarter mile and came home sixth as Too Darn Hot won from Circus Maximus. In September he was sent to France and ran fifth to Circus Maximus in the Prix du Moulin at Longchamp Racecourse. On his final racecourse appearance Phoenix of Spain contested the Queen Elizabeth II Stakes at Ascot on 19 October. Ridden by Doyle he raced in second place before dropping out of contention in the last quarter mile and finished tenth behind King of Change, beaten almost twelve lengths by the winner.

Four days after his final race it was announced that Phoenix of Spain had been retired from racing and would begin his career as a breeding stallion at the Irish National Stud in 2020.

== Pedigree ==
Pedigree of Phoenix of Spain (IRE), grey colt, 2016
Sire Lope de Vega (IRE) 2007	Shamardal (USA); 2002	Giant's Causeway	Storm Cat
Sire Lope de Vega (IRE) 2007	Shamardal (USA); 2002	Giant's Causeway	Mariah's Storm
Sire Lope de Vega (IRE) 2007	Shamardal (USA); 2002	Helsinki (GB)	Machiavellian (USA)
Sire Lope de Vega (IRE) 2007	Shamardal (USA); 2002	Helsinki (GB)	Helen Street
Sire Lope de Vega (IRE) 2007	Lady Vettori (GB); 1997	Vettori (IRE)	Machiavellian (USA)
Sire Lope de Vega (IRE) 2007	Lady Vettori (GB); 1997	Vettori (IRE)	Air Distingue (USA)
Sire Lope de Vega (IRE) 2007	Lady Vettori (GB); 1997	Lady Golconda (FR)	Kendor
Sire Lope de Vega (IRE) 2007	Lady Vettori (GB); 1997	Lady Golconda (FR)	Lady Sharp
Dam Lucky Clio (IRE) 2004	Key of Luck (USA); 1991	Chief's Crown	Danzig
Dam Lucky Clio (IRE) 2004	Key of Luck (USA); 1991	Chief's Crown	Six Crowns
Dam Lucky Clio (IRE) 2004	Key of Luck (USA); 1991	Balbonella (FR)	Gay Mecene (USA)
Dam Lucky Clio (IRE) 2004	Key of Luck (USA); 1991	Balbonella (FR)	Bamieres
Dam Lucky Clio (IRE) 2004	Special Lady (FR); 1992	Kaldoun	Caro (IRE)
Dam Lucky Clio (IRE) 2004	Special Lady (FR); 1992	Kaldoun	Katana
Dam Lucky Clio (IRE) 2004	Special Lady (FR); 1992	Macedoine	King of Macedon (IRE)
Dam Lucky Clio (IRE) 2004	Special Lady (FR); 1992	Macedoine	Sainte Colere (Family: 8-d)

- Through his sire, Phoenix of Spain was inbred 4 × 4 to Machiavellian, meaning that this stallion appears twice in the fourth generation of his pedigree.
