= Irish National Stud =

Horse stud in Kildare, Ireland

Coordinates: 53.144582°N 6.901603°W

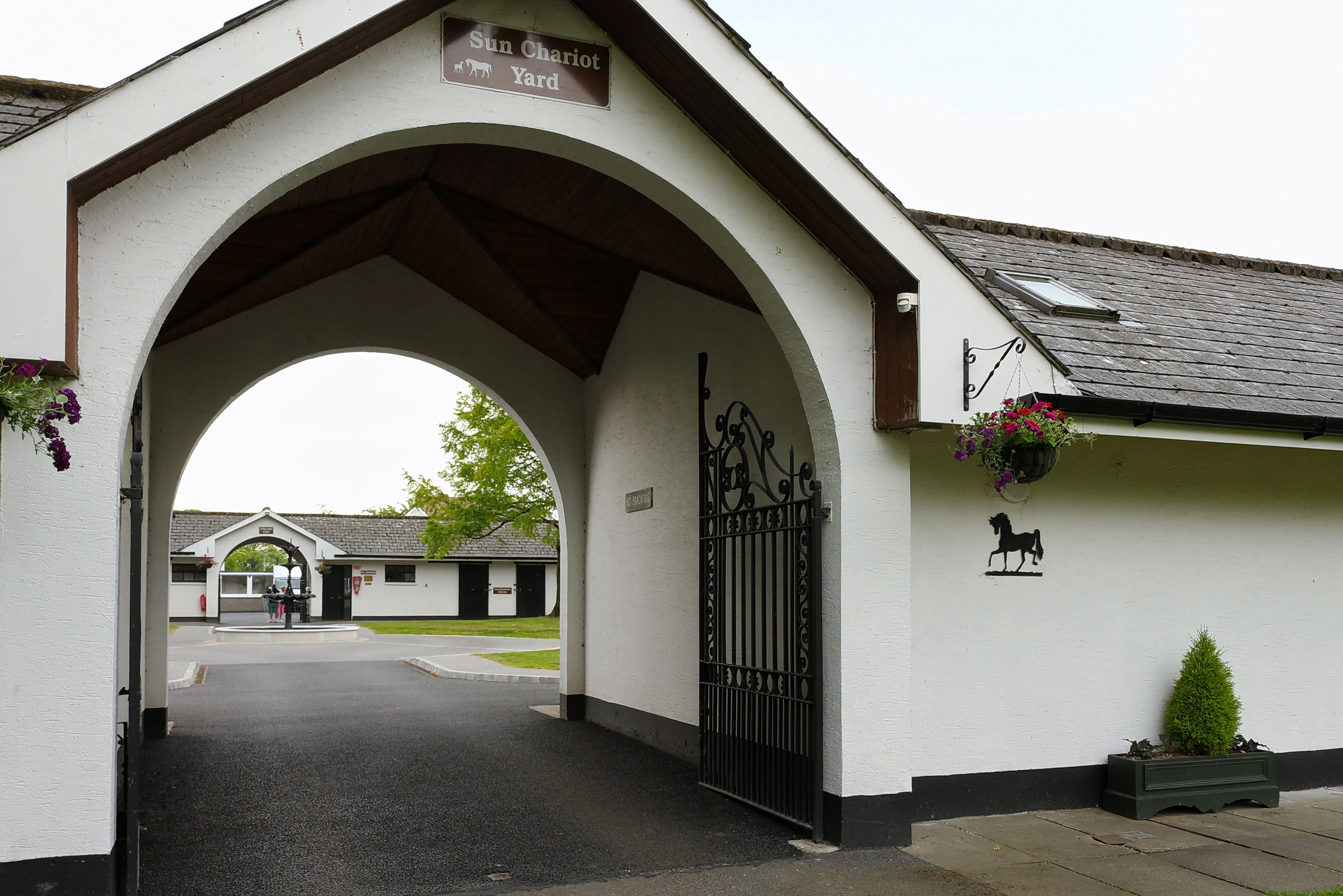
Irish National Stud

The Irish National Stud (official name: Comhlacht Graí Náisiúnta na hÉireann) is a Thoroughbred horse breeding facility in Tully, Kildare, County Kildare, Ireland. It was formally established by incorporation on 11 April 1946 under the National Stud Act, 1945 and is owned by the Irish Government.

== History ==
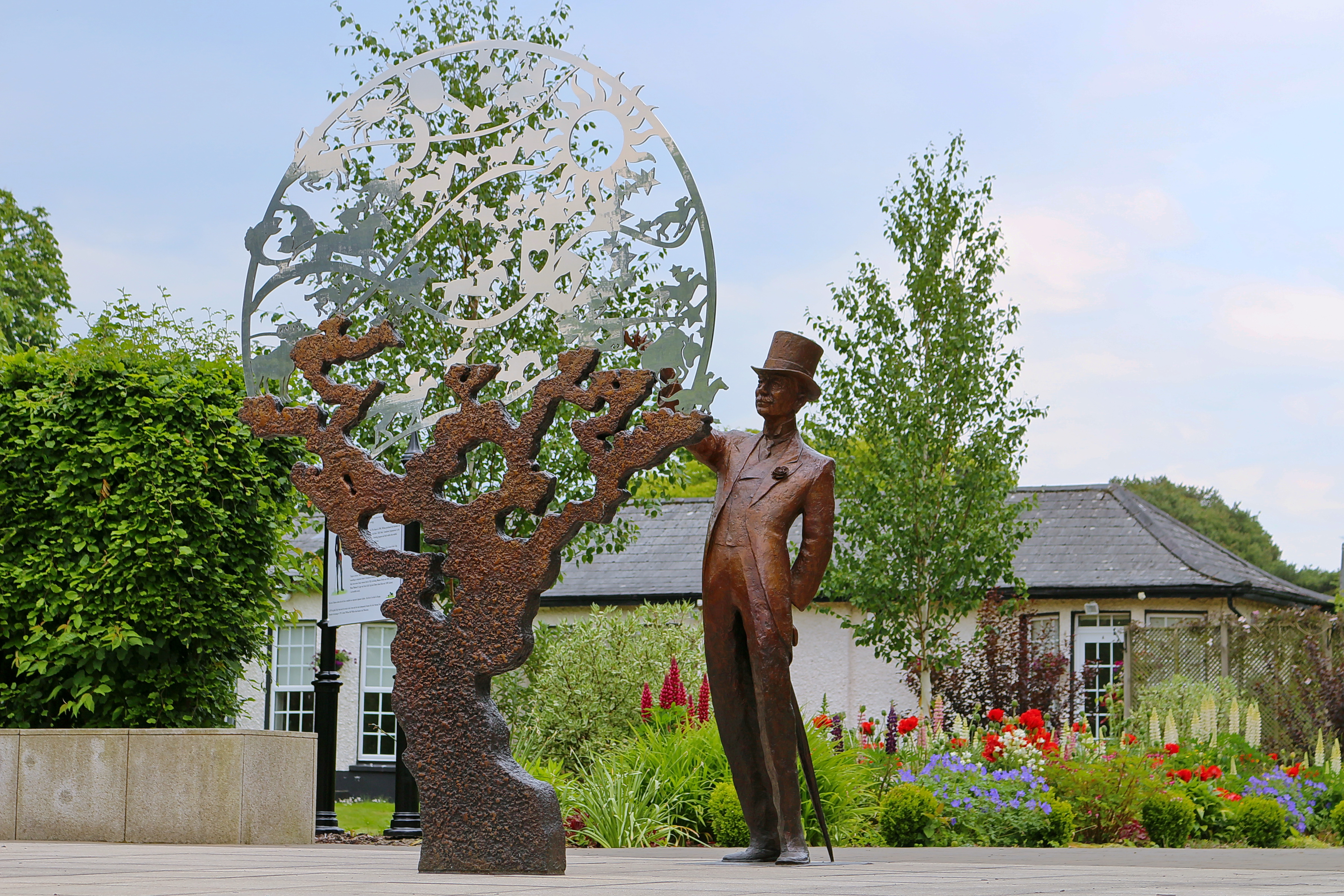
Statue of William Walker at the Irish National Stud

In 1900, British businessman and racehorse owner, William Walker, later Lord Wavertree, used the proceeds of The Soarer's 1896 Grand National victory to purchase the Tully estate near Kildare for a stud.

He employed Japanese landscape gardener Tassa Eida in 1906 to design a Japanese Garden at Tully and supervise its construction, which took four years and involved forty local labourers. Water in the boggy area was diverted to create streams and ponds, and hundreds of tons of rock were brought from Ballyknockan. Plants included semi-mature Scots pines lifted and replanted, and Alpines from Walker's own nursery. A tea-house, statues and Bonsai trees were shipped from Japan. The garden was designed to symbolise the journey of life.

An early success for the stud was the 1909 Epsom Derby winner Minoru, named after one of Eida's sons. By 1915, horses bred at the stud had won the One Thousand Guineas (twice), the St Leger, and the Ascot Gold Cup.

In 1916 Walker made a gift to the British Government of the entire bloodstock of the Tully stud. As part of the arrangement, the British government bought the Irish property from Walker for £47,625. The stud was placed under the control of the Ministry of Agriculture, who appointed Henry Greer as its first director. Notable horses bred at the stud included Blandford, Myrobella, Royal Lancer, Big Game, Sun Chariot and Chamossaire. The Tully property was sold to the Irish Government in 1943, while the bloodstock was removed to form The National Stud in England.

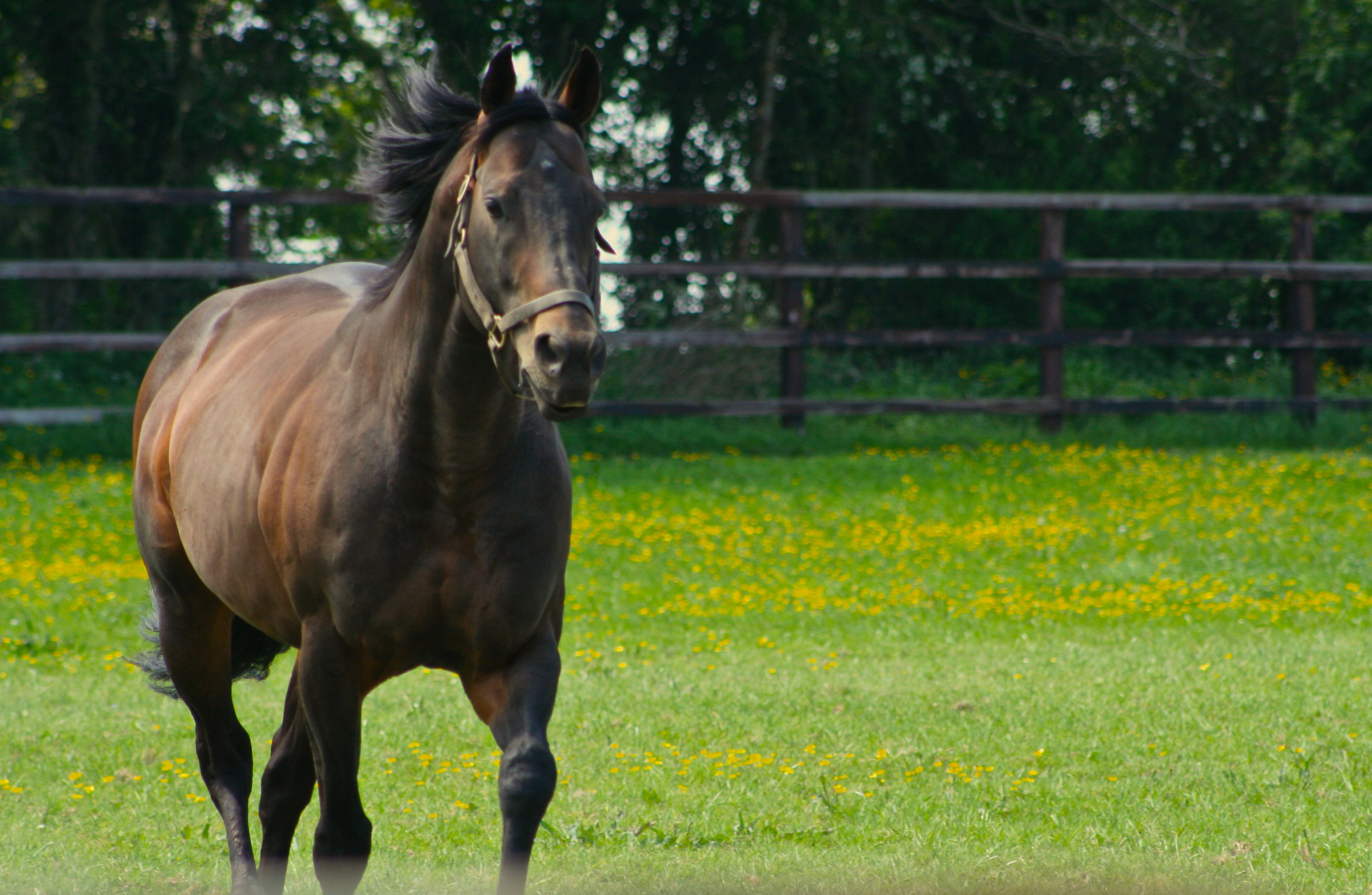
Invicible Spirit at the Irish National Stud in 2012

In 1946 the Irish National Stud was formally incorporated under the National Stud Act and, now under the ownership of the Irish Government, purchased its first stallion, Royal Charger for £52,000. In the 1970s the stud was opened to visitors and a six-month course in thoroughbred breeding and management was established. In 1980 the stud acquired the sprinter Ahonoora on his retirement. He went on to become a leading sire, as did his son Indian Ridge. Invincible Spirit joined the stallion roster in 2003 and became the stud's most successful sire, retiring in 2024. During the 2000s, there were a number of controversies at the stud, including expense account scandals and civil court actions. Queen Elizabeth visited the stud while on her first state visit to Ireland in May 2011.

== Facilities and attractions ==
The irish National Stud attracts over 140,000 visitors a year, about half of them from overseas.

=== Horses ===
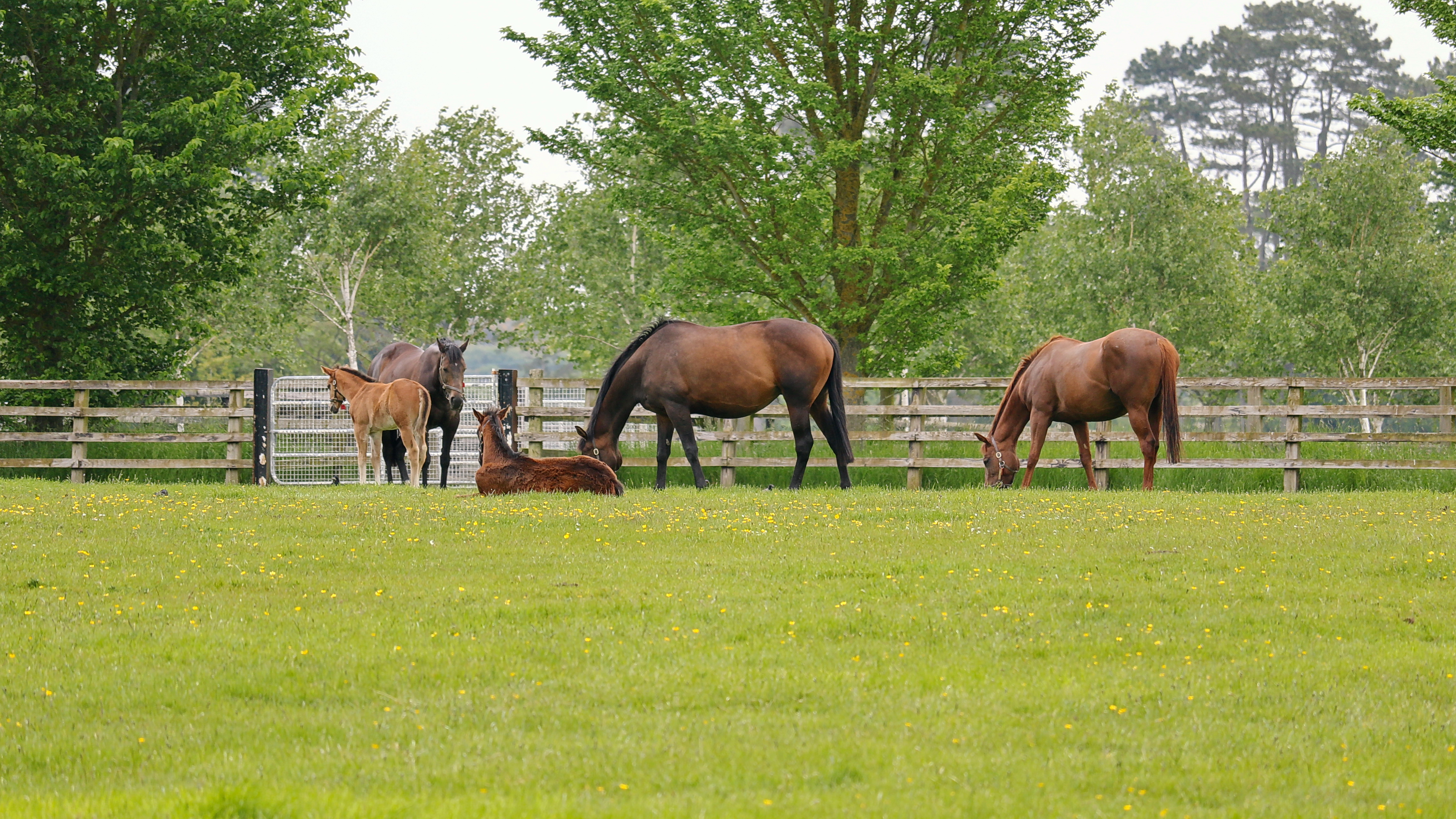
Mares and foals at the Irish National Stud

As of 2026, the stallion roster at the Irish National Stud was headed by Phoenix of Spain (winner of the 2019 Irish 2,000 Guineas), who stood at a fee of €12,500. Also on the roster were Lucky Vega, Nando Parrado and Shouldvebeenaring. Invincible Spirit, who retired from the roster in 2024, was still living at the stud. The stud also has a band of broodmares, whose foals are usually sold at public auction, and provides boarding and foaling services. A group of retired multiple Grade 1 winning National Hunt horses make up the "living legends". As of 2025, they were: Beef Or Salmon, Hurricane Fly, Faugheen and Sizing John.

=== The Japanese Garden ===
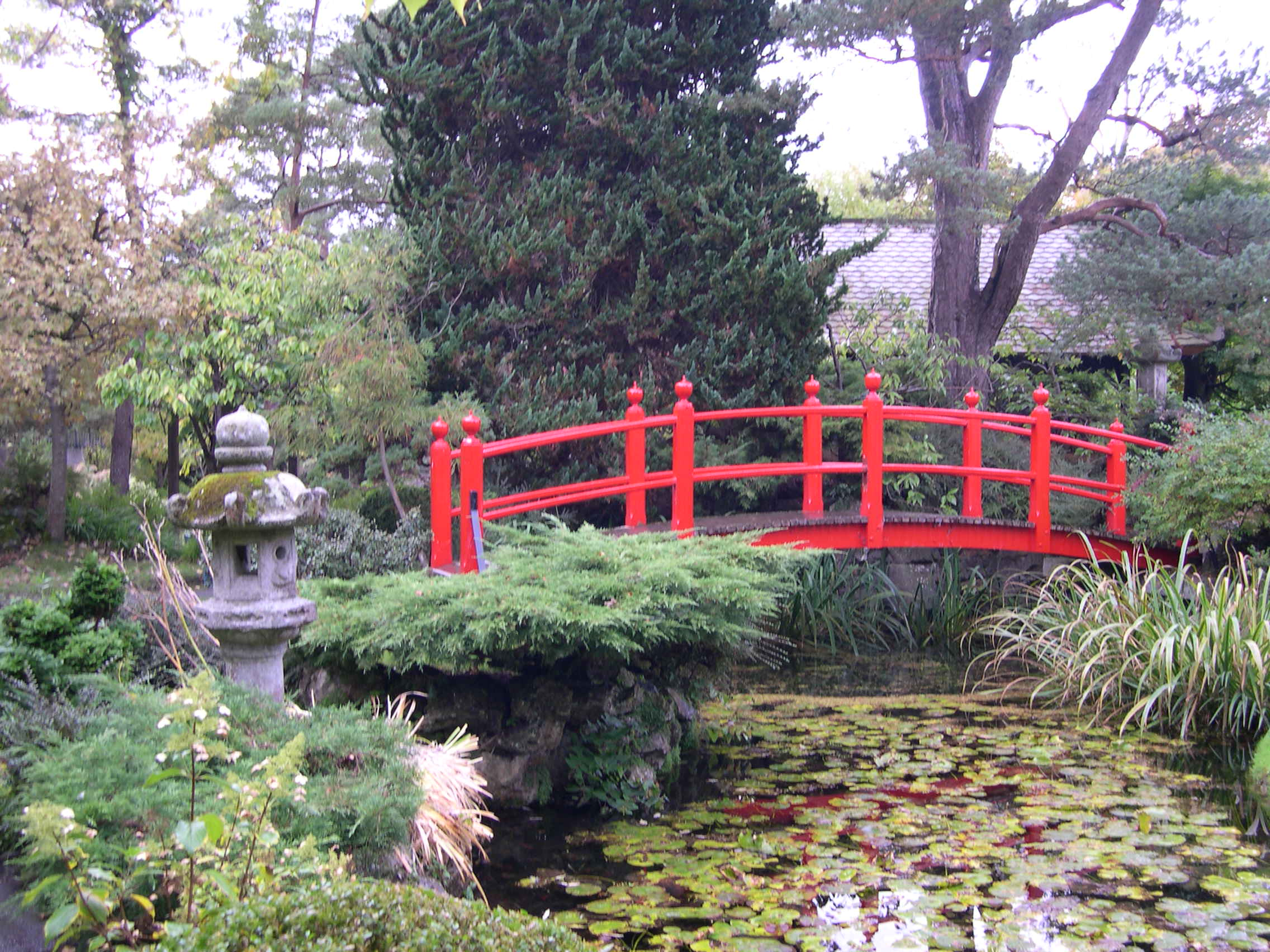
The Japanese garden

The Japanese Garden, created for William Walker between 1906 and 1910, symbolises the journey through life and includes features such as the Tunnel of Ignorance, the Hill of Learning, the Well of Wisdom, and the Island of Joy and Wonder. The garden was laid out as a hill and water garden, with a dry garden being added in the 1970s.

=== St. Fiachra's Garden ===
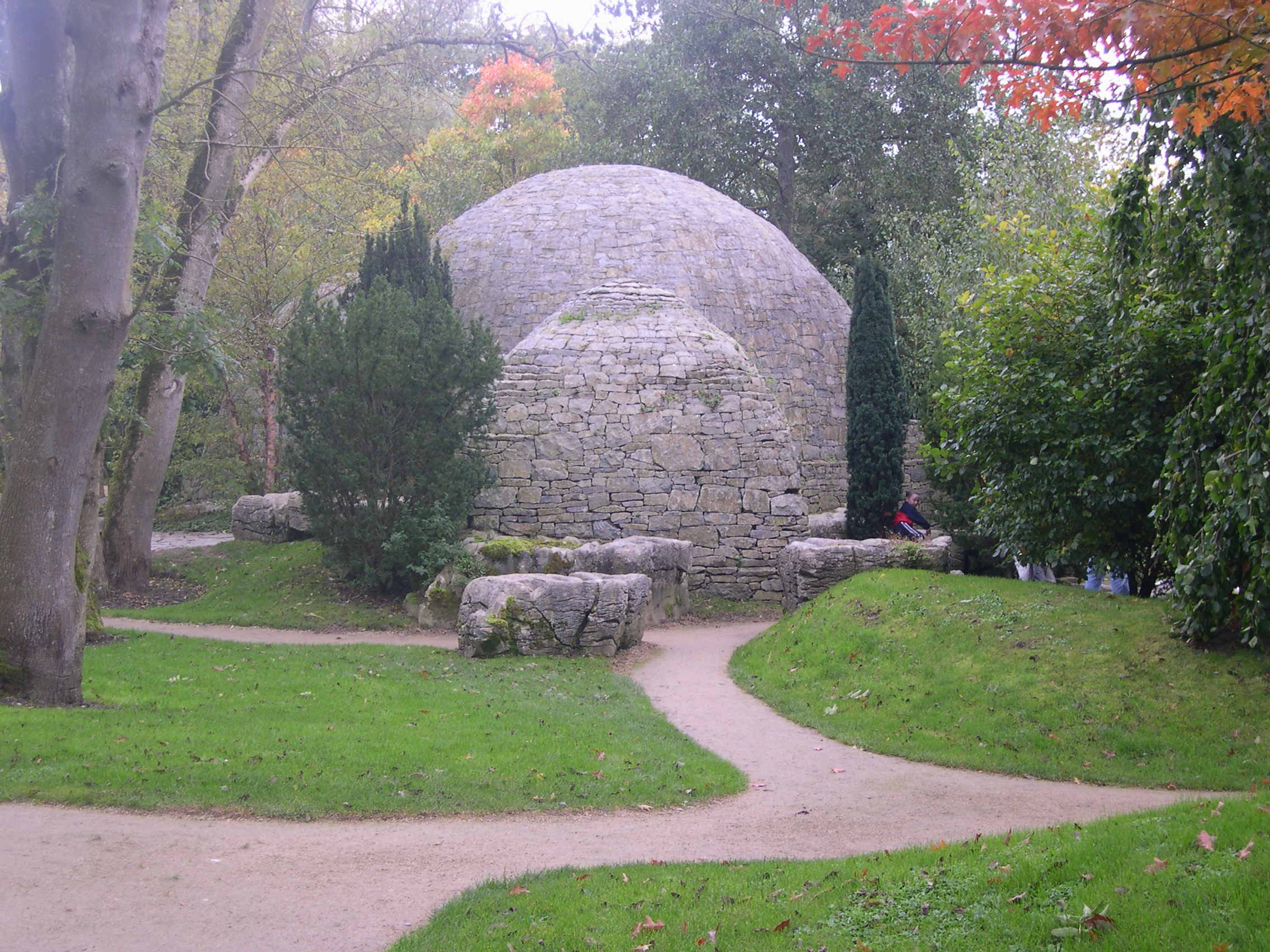
St. Fiachra's Garden

St. Fiachra's garden was designed by Martin Hallinan, built at a cost of over £1 million and opened by President Mary McAleese in 1999 to celebrate the Millennium. The garden commemorates the Patron Saint of Gardeners St. Fiachra or Fiacre, who features in a bronze lakeside statue. Inspired by the Irish landscape, with monastic cells and a fairy trail, the garden is a haven for wildlife including ducks and rabbits.

=== The Horse Museum ===
In 1976 the stud opened a museum. A controversial decision was taken to exhume three times Cheltenham Gold Cup winner Arkle and put his skeleton on display. The Irish Racehorse Experience, an immersive visitor attraction, was opened in 2021 and won several awards.

=== Education ===
Every year, the stud runs a six-month residential course on thoroughbred breeding management which attracts students from Ireland and abroad. Graduates of the course are in demand worldwide. Cathal Beale, who was appointed chief executive of the Irish National Stud in 2017, graduated from the course in 2007.

== Governance ==
All shares in the stud's holding company are vested in the Minister for Finance of Ireland, aside from nominal shareholdings provided to directors. The directors, including the Chairperson, are appointed by the Minister for Agriculture.

In 2026, David Mongey was appointed to succeed the late Dan Flinter as Chairperson of the stud. Previous twenty-first century chairpersons were Matt Dempsey (2013-2023) and Chryss Goulandris (1998-2012).

== See also ==
- List of acts of the Oireachtas
  - National Stud Act, 1945
  - National Stud Act, 1953
  - National Stud Act, 1969
  - National Stud Act, 1976
  - National Stud (Amendment) Act, 1993
  - National Stud (Amendment) Act, 2000
