= Road To Paris =

New Zealand-bred Thoroughbred racehorse

- Sire: Circus Maximus
- Grandsire: Galileo
- Dam: Spirit Of Heaven
- Damsire: Savabeel
- Sex: Gelding
- Foaled: 5 October 2022
- Country: New Zealand
- Colour: Bay
- Breeder: Mrs J M Wanless
- Owner: Ron & Judi Wanless
- Trainer: Roger James & Robert Wellwood
- Record: 7:2-2-0
- Earnings: NZ$823,235

Major wins
- New Zealand Derby (2026)

Road To Paris (foaled 5 October 2022) is a New Zealand racehorse and winner of the 2026 New Zealand Derby. He was a record-extending seventh winner of the race for Roger James, who trains in partnership with Robert Wellwood.

== Background ==
Road To Paris was bred by Judi Wanless, who races him in partnership with her husband Ron. Road To Paris is a son of the triple Group One-winning Galileo stallion Circus Maximus. Circus Maximus stands at Windsor Park Stud, and Road To Paris comes from his first southern hemisphere three-year-old crop. He is the first stallion to sire a New Zealand Derby winner in his first crop of three-year-olds since Stryker with Rangipo in 2016.

== Racing career ==
Road To Paris was always held in high regard by co-trainer Roger James, who identified him as a Derby prospect during his two-year-old season. He made his debut over 1200 metres at Ellerslie in October, finishing seventh, then scored a maiden victory over 1400 metres at Avondale on November 6.

James and Wellwood stepped him up to Group Three level for the Wellington Stakes in just his third start. He took control in the straight and was almost certainly heading for victory when he shied away from the winning post and dislodged his jockey Masa Hashizume.

Road To Paris got his campaign back on track in January with a sixth in the Levin Classic and two second placings including the Avondale Guineas.

Sent out as a $9.70 third favourite for the New Zealand Derby on March 7, Road To Paris finished strongly out of the pack to beat his stablemate Autumn Glory and the third-placed Geneva. He was ridden to victory by George Rooke.

Road To Paris again showed his inexperience in the closing stages of the Derby, shifting inwards and impeding Autumn Glory and Geneva, but post-race protests by the connections of the placegetters were unsuccessful.

== See also ==
- 2026 New Zealand Derby
