= Doncaster Mile Stakes =

Flat horse race in Britain

- Class: Listed
- Location: Doncaster Racecourse; Doncaster, England
- Race type: Flat / Thoroughbred
- Sponsor: William Hill
- Website: Doncaster

Race information
- Distance: 1m (1,609 metres)
- Surface: Turf
- Track: Left-handed
- Qualification: Four-years-old and up exc. G1 winners after 31 August 2023
- Weight: 9 st 2 lb; Allowances; 5 lb for fillies and mares Penalties; 7 lb for Group 2 winners 5 lb for Group 3 winners * 3 lb for Listed winners * * since 31 August last year
- Purse: £60,000 (2024); 1st: £34,026

Doncaster Mile Stakes
2026
Docklands	Volterra	Excellent Believe

Previous years
2025
Dancing Gemini	Checkandchallenge	Botanical
2024
Charyn	Astral Beau	Grey's Monument
2023
Astral Beau	Brunch	Tacarib Bay
2022
Chindit	Tempus	Boosala
2021
Top Rank	What's The Story	Montatham

2020-2011
2019
Sharja Bridge	Red Starlight	Gabrial
2018
Zabeel Prince	Born To Be Alive	Another Touch
2017
Kool Kompany	Stormy Antarctic	Dawn Of Hope
2016
Belardo	Calling Out	Custom Cut
2015
Tullius	Glory Awaits	Sirius Prospect
2014
Graphic	Fencing	Custom Cut
2013
Gabrial	Don't Call Me	Stand My Ground
2012
Penitent	Questioning	Navajo Chief
2011
St Moritz	Off Chance	Balcarce Nov

2010-2003
2010
Fanunalter	Mia's Boy	Dunelight
2009
Staying On	Unnefer	Dream Lodge
2008
Medicine Path	Don't Panic	Babodana
2007
Banknote	Chicken Soup	Orchard Supreme
2006
Kandidate	Vanderlin	Azarole
2005
Autumn Glory	Hurricane Alan	Putra Pekan
2004
Sublimity	Gateman	Rockets 'n Rollers
2003
Dandoun	With Reason	Smirk

The Doncaster Mile Stakes is a Listed flat horse race in Great Britain open to horses aged four years or older. It is run at Doncaster Racecourse over a distance of 1 mile (1,609 metres), and it is scheduled to take place each year in late March or early April. It is currently held on the opening day of the British flat racing turf season, at the same race meeting as the Lincoln Handicap.

== Winners ==
Year	Winner	Age	Jockey	Trainer	Time
1981	Cracaval	5	Steve Cauthen	Barry Hills	1:47.70
1982	Princes Gate	5	Paul Cook	Harry Thomson Jones	1:41.53
1983	Princes Gate	6	Paul Cook	Harry Thomson Jones	1:43.92
1984	Spanish Place	4	Steve Cauthen	Barry Hills	1:41.24
1985	King Of Clubs	4	Pat Eddery	Ian Balding	1:41.10
1986	Mac's Reef	4	Greville Starkey	Mick Ryan	1:48.34
1987	Dr Bulasco	3	Tyrone Williams	Steve Norton	1:46.74
1988	Vague Shot	5	Steve Cauthen	Robert Williams	1:49.83
1989	Beau Sher	6	Bruce Raymond	Ben Hanbury	1:42.17
1990	Lunar Mover	4	John Reid	Charlie Nelson	1:38.05
1991	Regal Crest	3	John Carroll	Jack Berry	1:44.02
1992	Daros	3	Alan Munro	Lynda Ramsden	1:43.17
1993	Mellottie	8	John Lowe	Mary Reveley	1:37.18
1994	Pay Homage	6	Frankie Dettori	Ian Balding	1:43.84
1995	Airport	4	John Carroll	John Gosden	1:42.68
1996	First Island	4	Michael Hills	Geoff Wragg	1:41.54
1997	Canyon Creek	4	Frankie Dettori	John Gosden	1:41.31
1998	Hornbeam	4	Ray Cochrane	John Jenkins	1:43.20
1999	White Heart	4	Darryll Holland	Mark Johnston	1:44.03
2000	Hasty Words	4	Michael Hills	Barry Hills	1:38.59
2001	Right Wing	7	Pat Eddery	John Dunlop	1:46.74
2002	Dandoun	4	Pat Eddery	John Dunlop	1:48.21
2003	Dandoun	5	Kieren Fallon	John Dunlop	1:42.54
2004	Sublimity	4	Johnny Murtagh	Sir Michael Stoute	1:39.13
2005	Autumn Glory	5	Steve Drowne	Geoff Wragg	1:39.52
2006 (Note: The race was run on the Polytrack at Lingfield in 2006 and 2007 due to the temporary closure of Doncaster Racecourse as part of its redevelopment.) (dh)	Kandidate; Vanderlin	4; 7	Seb Sanders; Martin Dwyer	Clive Brittain; Andrew Balding	1:38.88
2007	Banknote	5	Darryll Holland	Andrew Balding	1:37.34
2008	Medicine Path	4	Jamie Spencer	Peter Chapple-Hyam	1:41.27
2009	Staying On	4	Adam Kirby	Walter Swinburn	1:34.46
2010	Fanunalter	4	Darryll Holland	Marco Botti	1:38.42
2011	St Moritz	5	Adrian Nicholls	David Nicholls	1:37.42
2012	Penitent	6	Danny Tudhope	David O'Meara	1:39.04
2013	Gabrial	4	Kieren Fallon	Richard Fahey	1:40.50
2014	Graphic	5	Seb Sanders	William Haggas	1:40.12
2015	Tullius	7	Jimmy Fortune	Andrew Balding	1:41.21
2016	Belardo	4	James Doyle	Roger Varian	1:46.48
2017	Kool Kompany	5	Ryan Moore	Richard Hannon Jr.	1:36.99
2018	Zabeel Prince	5	Andrea Atzeni	Roger Varian	1:43.63
2019	Sharja Bridge	5	Andrea Atzeni	Roger Varian	1:36.65
	no race 2020 (Note: The 2020 running was cancelled because of the COVID-19 pandemic in the United Kingdom)
2021	Top Rank	5	P. J. McDonald	James Tate	1:38.47
2022	Chindit	4	Rossa Ryan	Richard Hannon Jr.	1:38.22
2023	Astral Beau	4	Rob Hornby	Pam Sly	1:50.18
2024	Charyn	4	Silvestre de Sousa	Roger Varian	1:45.68
2025	Dancing Gemini	4	Kieran Shoemark	Roger Teal	1:38.10
2026	Docklands	6	Jamie Spencer	Harry Eustace	1:41.61

== See also ==
- Horse racing in Great Britain
- List of British flat horse races
