= 2026 New Zealand Derby =

Group I horse race

The 2026 New Zealand Derby was a Group I horse race which was run at Ellerslie Racecourse in Auckland, New Zealand, on 7 March 2026. It was the 151st running of the New Zealand Derby, and it was won by Road To Paris.

The 2026 New Zealand Derby was part of Champions Day, which also featured the Group One Sistema Stakes, Group One New Zealand Stakes, Group Two Auckland Cup, Group Two Al Basti Equiworld Dubai Classic and the $4 million NZB Kiwi.

== Details ==
Road To Paris is trained by Roger James and Robert Wellwood at Cambridge. He became the seventh Derby winner for James - the most for any trainer since Christchurch's New Zealand Derby and Auckland's Great Northern Derby were combined to form the modern-day New Zealand Derby in 1973.

Road To Paris is raced by his Queensland-based breeders Ron and Judi Wanless.

Road To Paris is a member of the first southern hemisphere three-year-old crop sired by the multiple Group One-winning Galileo stallion Circus Maximus, who stands at Windsor Park Stud. Circus Maximus is the first stallion to sire a New Zealand Derby winner in his first three-year-old crop since Stryker with Rangipo in 2016.

Although he was unraced as a two-year-old, Road To Paris was always held in high regard by James and Wellwood. His trainers labelled him a New Zealand Derby prospect while he was still a juvenile.

He made his debut over 1200 metres at Ellerslie in October, finishing seventh, then scored a maiden victory over 1400 metres at Avondale on November 6.

James and Wellwood stepped him up to Group Three level for the Wellington Stakes in just his third start. He took control in the straight and was almost certainly heading for victory when he shied away from the winning post and dislodged his jockey Masa Hashizume.

Road To Paris got his campaign back on track in January with a sixth in the Levin Classic and two second placings including the Avondale Guineas.

Sent out as a $9.70 third favourite for the New Zealand Derby on March 7 and with George Rooke in the saddle, Road To Paris finished strongly out of the pack to win by a length over his stablemate Autumn Glory. The third-placed Geneva finished another three-quarters of a length behind the first pair.

Road To Paris again showed his inexperience in the closing stages of the Derby, shifting inwards and impeding Autumn Glory and Geneva, but post-race protests by the connections of the placegetters were unsuccessful.

== Race details ==
- Sponsor: Hong Kong Jockey Club World Pool
- Prize money: NZ$1,250,000
- Track: Good
- Number of runners: 16
- Winner's time: 2:31.25

== Full result ==
| | Margin | Horse | Jockey | Trainer(s) | Odds |
|---|---|---|---|---|---|
| 1 | | Road To Paris | George Rooke | Roger James & Robert Wellwood | $9.70 |
| 2 | 1 | Autumn Glory | Wiremu Pinn | Roger James & Robert Wellwood | $4.10 |
| 3 | 3/4 | Geneva | Ben Thompson | Kylie Hoskin | $21.70 |
| 4 | Long neck | Wigmore | Kelly Myers | Caley Myers | $100.40 |
| 5 | 1 1/2 | Sweet Ice | Warren Kennedy | David Greene | $66.60 |
| 6 | Long neck | That's Gold | Samantha Collett | Chris Wood | $2.30 |
| 7 | Short head | Towering Vision | Opie Bosson | Mark Walker & Sam Bergerson | $15.80 |
| 8 | Short head | Yamato Satona | Joe Doyle | Lance O'Sullivan & Andrew Scott | $38.20 |
| 9 | 1 3/4 | Halo's Fire | Ryan Elliot | Mark Forbes | $69.50 |
| 10 | 2 1/2 | Tulsa King | Jonathan Riddell | Aaron Bidlake | $36.00 |
| 11 | 1 | Lunaman | Craig Grylls | Stephen Marsh | $27.30 |
| 12 | 4 1/2 | Ariadne | Masa Hashizume | Roger James & Robert Wellwood | $15.40 |
| 13 | 1 3/4 | Aksil | Michael Dee | Simon & Katrina Alexander | $11.50 |
| 14 | 8 | Genki | Rory Hutchings | Lance O'Sullivan & Andrew Scott | $35.40 |
| 15 | Neck | Magic Carpet | Matthew Cameron | Stephen Marsh | $107.20 |
| 16 | Nose | Taylor Square | Lynsey Satherley | Paul Mirabelli | $188.10 |

== Winner's details ==
Further details of the winner, Road To Paris:

- Foaled: 5 October 2022
- Sire: Circus Maximus; Dam: Spirit Of Heaven (by Savabeel)
- Owner: Ron & Judi Wanless
- Trainer: Roger James & Robert Wellwood
- Breeder: Mrs J M Wanless
- Starts: 7
- Wins: 2
- Seconds: 2
- Thirds: 0
- Earnings: NZ$823,235

=== The road to the Derby ===
Early-season appearances prior to running in the Derby.

- Road To Paris – lost his rider when he shied at the finish line when leading in the Wellington Stakes, then 6th in the Levin Classic and 2nd in the Avondale Guineas.
- Autumn Glory – 1st Waikato Guineas, 2nd New Zealand Oaks
- Geneva – 4th Northland Breeders' Stakes, 8th Sir Colin Meads Trophy, 9th James & Annie Sarten Memorial, 7th Levin Classic, 6th Waikato Guineas
- Sweet Ice – 3rd Trevor & Corallie Eagle Memorial, 6th Karaka Millions 3YO, 4th Waikato Guineas, 11th Avondale Guineas
- That's Gold – 1st Bonecrusher Stakes, 5th Auckland Guineas, 1st Karapiro Classic, 1st Avondale Guineas
- Towering Vision – 4th Trevor & Corallie Eagle Memorial, 2nd Waikato Guineas, 12th Avondale Guineas
- Yamato Satona – 6th Bonecrusher Stakes, 3rd Gingernuts Salver, 3rd Waikato Guineas, 8th Avondale Guineas
- Halo's Fire – 4th Levin Classic, 5th Avondale Guineas
- Tulsa King – 2nd Wellington Stakes, 2nd Gingernuts Salver
- Lunaman – 5th Waikato Guineas, 9th Avondale Guineas
- Ariadne – 2nd Lowland Stakes, 4th New Zealand Oaks
- Aksil – 6th Avondale Guineas
- Genki – 8th Gingernuts Salver, 3rd Avondale Guineas
- Magic Carpet – 1st Hawke's Bay Guineas, 6th James & Annie Sarten Memorial, 8th New Zealand 2000 Guineas, 10th Avondale Guineas
- Taylor Square – 7th Hawke's Bay Guineas, 9th Trevor & Corallie Eagle Memorial, 4th Bonecrusher Stakes, 6th Gingernuts Salver, 7th Avondale Guineas

=== Subsequent Group 1 wins ===
Subsequent wins at Group 1 level by runners in the 2025 New Zealand Derby.

- Wigmore – winner of the 2026 South Australian Derby

== See also ==
- Recent winners of major NZ 3 year old races
