= Benvenuto Cellini (horse) =

Irish-bred Thoroughbred racehorse

- Sire: Frankel
- Grandsire: Galileo
- Dam: Newspaperofrecord
- Damsire: Lope De Vega
- Sex: Colt
- Foaled: 17 April 2023
- Country: Ireland
- Colour: Chestnut
- Breeder: Coolmore and White Birch Farm
- Owner: Brant, Magnier, Tabor, Smith and Westerberg
- Trainer: Aidan O'Brien
- Jockey: Ryan Moore
- Record: 10: 5–1–2
- Earnings: £2,953,120

Major wins
- Champions Juvenile Stakes (2025); Chester Vase (2026); Irish Derby (2026); Breeders' Cup Turf (2026); Timeform rating: 125
- Last updated on 7 November 2026

Benvenuto Cellini (foaled 17 April 2023) is an Irish-bred and Irish-trained Thoroughbred racehorse. A son of Frankel out of Breeders' Cup winner Newspaperofrecord, he was placed in the Futurity Trophy as a two-year-old in 2025. In 2026 he won the Irish Derby and the Breeders' Cup Turf (at odds of 13/4F) and was placed in the King George VI and Queen Elizabeth Stakes. He is trained by Aidan O'Brien and ridden by Ryan Moore.

== Racing career ==
=== 2025: two-year-old season ===
Benvenuto Cellini made his racing debut at the Curragh on 28 June 2025, where he finished second. In his next race at Killarney in July, he took victory and broke his maiden status. In September, he won the Group 2 Champions Juvenile Stakes, before ending the 2025 season with a third at the Futurity Trophy.

=== 2026: three-year-old season ===
Benvenuto Cellini's 2026 campaign began in early May with a win in the Group 3 Chester Vase. He was then entered in the Derby, for which he started favourite. He finished 10th, but after the race was declared a non-runner when it was discovered that he had a hind leg on the rail of his starting gate, which greatly affected his chances. His next race was the Irish Derby, where he was again favourite, but this time had no issues in recording his first Group 1 win. In July, he finished third in the King George VI and Queen Elizabeth Stakes.

Benvenuto Cellini's next races were in France – the Group 2 Prix Niel and the Group 1 Prix de l'Arc de Triomphe. However, he only managed finishes of fifth and ninth, respectively.

Benvenuto Cellini's international campaign continued with the Breeders' Cup Turf in the United States, which he won in the final moments. This gave Moore a record sixth victory in the event. Timeform gave the colt a rating of 125 after this success.

== Statistics ==
Date	Distance	Race	Grade/ Group	Track	Odds	Field	Finish	Winning Time	Winning (Losing) Margin	Winner (2nd place)	Jockey	Ref
2025 – two-year-old season
28 Jun 2025	7f	Maiden		The Curragh	11/2	13	2	1:24.48	(1 1/2 lengths)	Dorset	Ryan Moore	
14 Jul 2025	1m 20y	Maiden		Killarney	2/5*	8	1	1:43.36	2 3/4 lengths	(Endorsement)	Wayne Lordan	
13 Sep 2025	1m	Juvenile Turf Stakes	II	Leopardstown	1/2*	4	1	1:42.35	5 lengths	(Hardy Warrior)	Christophe Soumillon	
25 Oct 2025	1m	Futurity Trophy	I	Doncaster	7/4*	5	3	1:43.85	(2 3/4 lengths)	Hawk Mountain	Christophe Soumillon	
2026 – three-year-old season
6 May 2026	1m 4f 63y	Chester Vase	III	Chester	2/9*	5	1	2:35.22	4 1/4 lengths	(Proposition)	Ryan Moore	
6 Jun 2026	1m 4f 6y	Epsom Derby	I	Epsom Downs	Non-runner^{1}			2:43.75	n/a	Christmas Day	Ryan Moore	
28 Jun 2026	1m 4f	Irish Derby	I	The Curragh	7/4*	8	1	2:28.33	1 3/4 lengths	(Christmas Day)	Ryan Moore	
25 Jul 2026	1m 3f 211y	King George VI and Queen Elizabeth Stakes	I	Ascot	4/1	9	3	2:27.72	(2 lengths)	Kalpana	Ryan Moore	
6 Sep 2026	1m 4f	Prix Niel	II	Longchamp	2/5*	7	5	2:25.70	(4 1/2 lengths)	Varandir	Ryan Moore	
4 Oct 2026	1m 4f	Prix de l'Arc de Triomphe	I	Longchamp	217/10	16	9	2:27.11	(4 1/4 lengths)	Daryz	Ryan Moore	
31 Oct 2026	1m 4f	Breeders' Cup Turf	I	Keeneland	13/4*	14	1	2:27.50	3/4 length	(Map of Stars)	Ryan Moore	

Notes:
An (*) asterisk after the odds means Benvenuto Cellini was the post-time favourite.

^{1} Benvenuto Cellini was declared a non-runner after the Epsom Derby after it was found he had a foot on the rail of his starting gate. His result for the race was voided.

== Pedigree ==
Pedigree of Benvenuto Cellini (IRE), chestnut colt, 17 April 2023
Sire Frankel (GB) (2008)	Galileo (IRE) (1998)	Sadler's Wells (USA) (1981)	Northern Dancer (CAN) (1961)
Sire Frankel (GB) (2008)	Galileo (IRE) (1998)	Sadler's Wells (USA) (1981)	Fairy Bridge (USA) (1975)
Sire Frankel (GB) (2008)	Galileo (IRE) (1998)	Urban Sea (USA) (1989)	Miswaki (USA) (1978)
Sire Frankel (GB) (2008)	Galileo (IRE) (1998)	Urban Sea (USA) (1989)	Allegretta (GB) (1978)
Sire Frankel (GB) (2008)	Kind (IRE) (2001)	Danehill (USA) (1986)	Danzig (USA) (1977)
Sire Frankel (GB) (2008)	Kind (IRE) (2001)	Danehill (USA) (1986)	Razyana (USA) (1981)
Sire Frankel (GB) (2008)	Kind (IRE) (2001)	Rainbow Lake (GB) (1990)	Rainbow Quest (USA) (1981)
Sire Frankel (GB) (2008)	Kind (IRE) (2001)	Rainbow Lake (GB) (1990)	Rockfest (USA) (1979)
Dam Newspaperofrecord (IRE) (2016)	Lope De Vega (IRE) (2007)	Shamardal (USA) (2002)	Giant's Causeway (USA) (1997)
Dam Newspaperofrecord (IRE) (2016)	Lope De Vega (IRE) (2007)	Shamardal (USA) (2002)	Helsinki (GB) (1993)
Dam Newspaperofrecord (IRE) (2016)	Lope De Vega (IRE) (2007)	Lady Vettori (GB) (1997)	Vettori (IRE) (1992)
Dam Newspaperofrecord (IRE) (2016)	Lope De Vega (IRE) (2007)	Lady Vettori (GB) (1997)	Lady Golconda (FR) (1992)
Dam Newspaperofrecord (IRE) (2016)	Sunday Times (GB) (2009)	Holy Roman Emperor (IRE) (2004)	Danehill (USA) (1986)
Dam Newspaperofrecord (IRE) (2016)	Sunday Times (GB) (2009)	Holy Roman Emperor (IRE) (2004)	L'On Vite (USA) (1986)
Dam Newspaperofrecord (IRE) (2016)	Sunday Times (GB) (2009)	Forever Times (GB) (1998)	So Factual (USA) (1990)
Dam Newspaperofrecord (IRE) (2016)	Sunday Times (GB) (2009)	Forever Times (GB) (1998)	Simply Times (USA) (1998) (family 9-g)

- Benvenuto Cellini is inbred 3S X 4D to the stallion Danehill, meaning that this horse appears in the third generation of the sire side of his pedigree and the fourth generation of the dam's side.
