= Lope De Vega (horse) =

Irish-bred Thoroughbred racehorse

- Sire: Shamardal (USA)
- Grandsire: Giant's Causeway (USA)
- Dam: Lady Vettori (GB)
- Damsire: Vettori (IRE)
- Sex: Stallion
- Foaled: 19 February 2007
- Country: Ireland
- Colour: Chestnut
- Breeder: Gestüt Ammerland
- Owner: Gestüt Ammerland
- Trainer: André Fabre
- Record: 9:4-0-1
- Earnings: £992,728

Major wins
- Prix du Jockey Club (2010); Poule d'Essai des Poulains (2010)

Lope De Vega (foaled 19 February 2007) is a retired Irish bred Thoroughbred racehorse and current breeding stallion.

== 2-year-old ==
Lope De Vega began his racing career at Deauville as a 2 year old on 26 August 2009, where he won by 2½ lengths. He also won his next race at Longchamp on 13 September 2009 before stepping up in class to Group One level for the first time in the Prix Jean Luc Lagadere. Lope De Vega was beaten for the first time by Siyouni in the Prix Jean Luc Lagadere - he finished 4th.

== 3-year-old ==
Lope De Vega's first start as a 3 year old came in the Prix De Fontainebleau on 25 April 2010, a noted trial for the Poule d'Essai des Poulains, and he finished 3rd behind the Aga Khan owned duo, Rajasaman, who won, and Siyouni, who finished 2nd. Lope De Vega's major breakthrough came in the Poule d'Essai des Poulains at Longchamp on 16 May 2010. Drawn wide in stall 15, Lope De Vega was held up until the top of straight, where he was pulled out wide to make his challenge, and he ran down 2000 Guineas runner up Dick Turpin to win by 1/2 length. Lope De Vega followed up his first Group 1 win winning the Prix Du Jockey Club by 3 lengths, which is the biggest winning distance in the race since it was reduced to 2100m in 2005. He was again drawn wide in stall 20, but he tracked across from the wide draw to take up a prominent position and drew clear in the straight to win eased down. In winning the Prix Du Jockey Club as well as the Poule d'Essai des Poulains, he emulated his sire Shamardal who won both races in 2005.

== Stud career ==
In 2011, Lope De Vega retired from racing and stood at Ballylinch Stud, Ireland and shuttled to Patinack Farm, Queensland Australia.

As of 2026, Lope De Vega's service fee is €200,000.

=== Notable progeny ===
Lope De Vega has currently sired 28 individual Group/Grade 1 winners:

c = colt, f = filly, g = gelding, r = ridgling

Foaled	Name	Sex	Major Wins
2012	Belardo	c	Dewhurst Stakes, Lockinge Stakes
2012	Santa Ana Lane	g	Sir Rupert Clarke Stakes, The Goodwood, Stradbroke Handicap, VRC Sprint Classic, TJ Smith Stakes
2012	The Right Man	g	Al Quoz Sprint
2012	Vega Magic	g	The Goodwood, Memsie Stakes
2013	Jemayel	f	Prix Saint-Alary
2013	Zabeel Prince	g	Prix d'Ispahan
2015	Capla Temptress	f	Natalma Stakes
2015	Gytrash	g	Black Caviar Lightning
2015	Vega One	g	Kingsford-Smith Cup
2016	Newspaperofrecord	f	Breeders' Cup Juvenile Fillies Turf, Just a Game Stakes
2016	Phoenix of Spain	c	Irish 2,000 Guineas
2017	Arapaho	g	Tancred Stakes, Sydney Cup
2017	Dreamloper	f	Prix d'Ispahan, Prix du Moulin
2017	Hypothetical	c	Al Maktoum Challenge, Round 3
2018	Aunt Pearl	f	Breeders' Cup Juvenile Fillies Turf
2018	Lucky Vega	c	Phoenix Stakes
2018	Sweet Lady	f	Prix Vermeille
2019	Duke De Sessa	g	Caulfield Cup
2019	Place Du Carrousel	f	Prix de l'Opéra
2020	Carl Spackler	c	Fourstardave Handicap, Turf Mile Stakes, Maker's Mark Mile Stakes
2020	Program Trading	r	Saratoga Derby Invitational Stakes, Hollywood Derby, Turf Classic Stakes
2021	Almaqam	c	Tattersalls Gold Cup
2021	Expensive Queen	f	Jenny Wiley Stakes
2021	Look De Vega	c	Prix du Jockey Club
2021	Rouhiya	f	Poule d'Essai des Pouliches
2022	Consent	f	Prix de Royallieu
2022	Shadow Of Light	c	Middle Park Stakes, Dewhurst Stakes
2024	Musical Times	f	Fillies' Mile

== Pedigree ==
Pedigree of Lope De Vega
Sire Shamardal b. 2002	Giant's Causeway ch. 1997	Storm Cat	Storm Bird
Sire Shamardal b. 2002	Giant's Causeway ch. 1997	Storm Cat	Terlingua
Sire Shamardal b. 2002	Giant's Causeway ch. 1997	Mariah's Storm	Rahy
Sire Shamardal b. 2002	Giant's Causeway ch. 1997	Mariah's Storm	Immense
Sire Shamardal b. 2002	Helsinki b. 1993	Machiavellian	Mr. Prospector
Sire Shamardal b. 2002	Helsinki b. 1993	Machiavellian	Coup de Folie
Sire Shamardal b. 2002	Helsinki b. 1993	Helen Street	Troy
Sire Shamardal b. 2002	Helsinki b. 1993	Helen Street	Waterway
Dam Lady Vettori b. 1997	Vettori b. 1992	Machiavellian	Mr. Prospector
Dam Lady Vettori b. 1997	Vettori b. 1992	Machiavellian	Coup de Folie
Dam Lady Vettori b. 1997	Vettori b. 1992	Air Distingue	Sir Ivor
Dam Lady Vettori b. 1997	Vettori b. 1992	Air Distingue	Euryanthe
Dam Lady Vettori b. 1997	Lady Golconda ch. 1992	Kendor	Kenmare
Dam Lady Vettori b. 1997	Lady Golconda ch. 1992	Kendor	Belle Mecene
Dam Lady Vettori b. 1997	Lady Golconda ch. 1992	Lady Sharp	Sharpman
Dam Lady Vettori b. 1997	Lady Golconda ch. 1992	Lady Sharp	Golondrina

- Lope De Vega is inbred 3 x 3 to Machiavellian, meaning that this stallion appears twice in the third generations of this pedigree.
