= Roger Varian =

British racehorse trainer (born 1979)

Personal information
- Born: 14 March 1979 (age 47)
- Occupation: Trainer

Horse racing career
- Sport: Horse racing

Major racing wins
- British Classic Race wins: St Leger Stakes (2014,2022)

Significant horses
- Kingston Hill, Belardo

Roger Varian is a British Thoroughbred racehorse trainer, based at Carlburg Stables in Newmarket, Suffolk.

== Riding career ==
Varian moved to the United States as a teenager and found employment as a work rider at Hollywood Park. On his return to the United Kingdom he rode as a National Hunt jockey, mainly for the Josh Gifford stable, riding seven winners. He went back to the United States in 2001 for the Maryland-based Jack Fisher, commenting that his riding career "needed a push forward". Less than two months after relocating to the United States, Varian sustained a serious wrist injury in a fall, ending his career as a jockey.

== Training career ==
Varian returned to the United Kingdom and became assistant trainer to Michael Jarvis at the Kremlin House stable in Newmarket. He remained at the stable for ten years, handling horses such as Rakti and Eswarah before taking over the yard when Jarvis retired due to poor health in February 2011. Commenting on his succession, Varian described himself as "very grateful... very privileged and... very lucky".

In his first season as a trainer Varian sent out the filly Nahrain to win the Prix de l'Opéra. Nahrain won the Flower Bowl Invitational Stakes in 2012, and other major winners from Varian's stable that year included Beyond Desire (Prix de Saint-Georges), Sri Putra (York Stakes) and Shimmering Surf (Pinnacle Stakes). In 2013, Varian's winners included Farraaj (Winter Derby), Ambivalent (Pretty Polly Stakes, Aljamaaher (Summer Mile Stakes), Princess Noor (Princess Margaret Stakes) and Kingston Hill), a grey two-year-old colt who won the Autumn Stakes and the Racing Post Trophy.

In 2014 Kingston Hill finished second in the Epsom Derby before giving Varian his first British Classic Race win in the St Leger. Other winners for Varian stable in 2014 included the filly Cursory Glance (Albany Stakes, Moyglare Stud Stakes), Ambivalent (Middleton Stakes), Vert de Grece (Critérium International) and Belardo, who was rated the best two-year-old colt trained in Europe after his win in the Dewhurst Stakes.

Varian moved from Kremlin House to Carlburg Stables in January 2017 after purchasing it from previous owner Clive Brittain.

== Major wins ==
(United Kingdom) Great Britain

- 1000 Guineas Stakes - (1) - Elmalka (2024)
- British Champions Fillies and Mares Stakes – (1) – Eshaada (2021)
- Champion Stakes - (1) - King Of Steel (2023)
- Coronation Cup – (2) – Postponed (2016), Defoe (2019)
- Dewhurst Stakes – (1) – Belardo (2014)
- International Stakes – (1) – Postponed (2016)
- Lockinge Stakes – (1) – Belardo (2016)
- Nassau Stakes - (1) - Al Husn (2023)
- Queen Anne Stakes - (1) - Charyn (2024)
- Queen Elizabeth II Stakes - (2) - Bayside Boy (2022), Charyn (2024)
- Racing Post Trophy – (1) – Kingston Hill (2013)
- St. Leger Stakes – (2) – Kingston Hill (2014), Eldar Eldarov (2022)

Canada

- E. P. Taylor Stakes – (1) – Sheikha Reika (2018)

France

- Critérium International – (1) – Vert De Grece (2014)
- Prix d'Ispahan – (1) – Zabeel Prince (2019)
- Prix de l'Opéra – (1) – Nahrain (2011)
- Prix Jacques Le Marois - (1) Charyn (2024)
- Prix Jean Romanet – (1) – Ajman Princess (2017)
- Prix Vermeille – (1) – Teona (2021)

Germany

- Grosser Preis von Baden – (1) – Saddadd (2026)

(Republic of Ireland) Ireland

- Irish St. Leger - (1) - Eldar Eldarov (2023)
- Moyglare Stud Stakes – (1) – Cursory Glance (2014)
- Pretty Polly Stakes – (2) – Ambivalent (2012), Nezwaah (2017)

(United Arab Emirates) UAE

- Dubai Sheema Classic – (1) – Postponed (2016)

(United States) USA

- Flower Bowl Invitational Stakes – (1) – Nahrain (2012)

== Family ==
Roger Varian is the son of Nigel and Sue Varian. His older brother Christopher was murdered in 2010 at Thame by a migrant worker with a history of mental illness. Varian is married to Hanako Sonobe and has three children: Momoka, Eiji and Reika.
