= Newspaperofrecord =

Irish-bred Thoroughbred racehorse

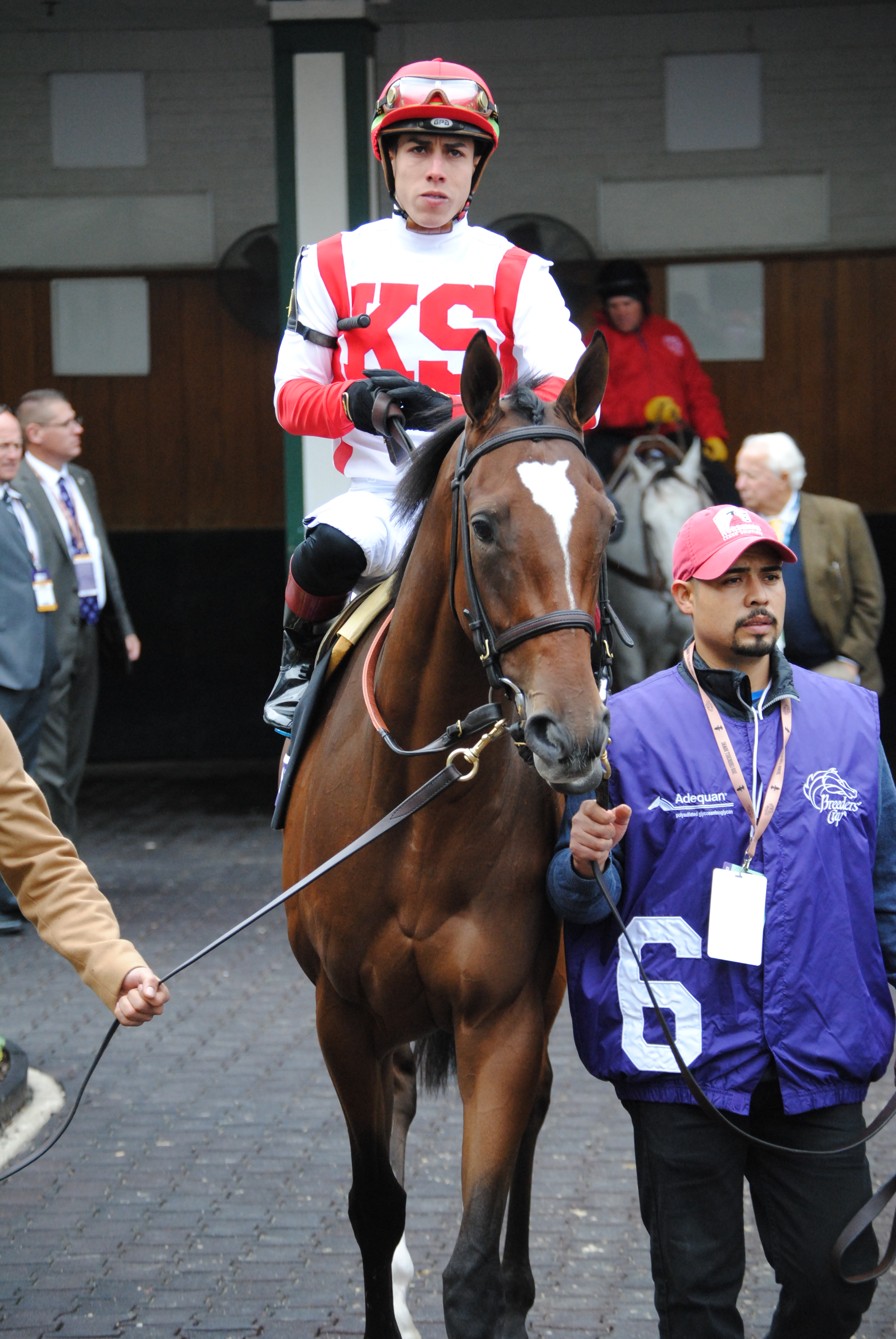
- Newspaperofrecord at the 2018 Breeders' Cup
- Sire: Lope de Vega
- Grandsire: Shamardal
- Dam: Sunday Times
- Damsire: Holy Roman Emperor
- Sex: Filly
- Foaled: 1 March 2016
- Country: Ireland
- Colour: Bay
- Breeder: Times of Wigan
- Owner: Klaravich Stables
- Trainer: Chad C. Brown
- Record: 8: 5-2-0
- Earnings: $988,250

Major wins
- Miss Grillo Stakes (2018); Breeders' Cup Juvenile Fillies Turf (2018); Intercontinental Stakes (2020); Just A Game Stakes (2020)
- Last updated on June 28, 2020

Newspaperofrecord (foaled 1 March 2016) is an Irish-bred, American-trained Thoroughbred racehorse. As a two-year-old in 2018, she was undefeated in three races including the Miss Grillo Stakes and the Breeders' Cup Juvenile Fillies Turf. After being winless in three starts at age three, she won her four-year-old debut, the Intercontinental Stakes.

== Background ==
Newspaperofrecord is a bay filly with a white blaze and white socks on her hind legs bred in Ireland by Times of Wigan. As a yearling she was offered for sale at Tattersalls in October 2017 and was bought by Klaravich Stables for 200,000 guineas. The filly was exported to the United States and was sent into training with Chad Brown.

She is from the fifth crop of foals sired by the Prix du Jockey Club winner Lope de Vega: other foals from Lope de Vega's first crop included the winners of the Gran Criterium, Sirenia Stakes and Cornwallis Stakes. His other foals have included Belardo, Vega Magic (Memsie Stakes), The Right Man (Al Quoz Sprint) and Santa Ana Lane (Stradbroke Handicap). Newspaperofrecord's dam, Sunday Times, was a successful racemare who won the Sceptre Stakes and finished second in the Cheveley Park Stakes. She was descended from the Argentinian mare Zamba (foaled 1949), making her a distant relative of La Lorgnette and Hawk Wing.

== Racing career ==
=== 2018: two-year-old season ===
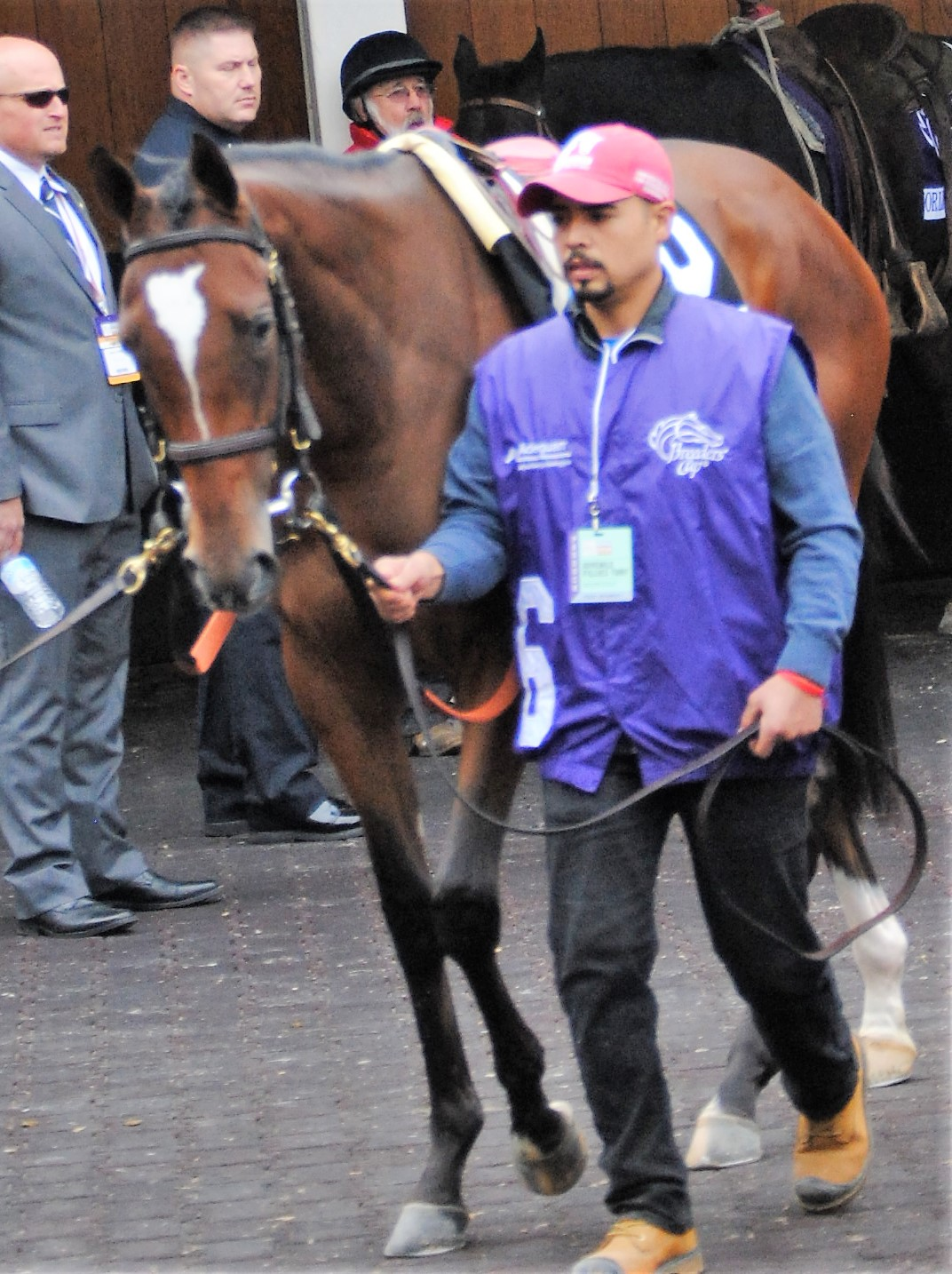
Newspaperofrecord at the 2018 Breeders' Cup

As a two-year-old Newspaperofrecord was campaigned exclusively on turf and was ridden in all three of her races by Irad Ortiz Jr. The filly made her debut in a maiden special weight over eight and a half furlongs at Saratoga Race Course on August 19. Starting the 3-2 favourite in a ten-runner field she raced in second place before taking the lead in the last quarter mile and "scampered" away from her rivals to win by almost seven lengths. On September 30 over the same distance the filly was stepped up in class for the Grade II Miss Grillo Stakes at Belmont Park and started favourite against eight opponents. She took the lead from the start, accelerated away from field in the closing stages and came home six and a half lengths clear of Varenka. Ortiz commented "Our plan was try to relax her and finish, but she broke so sharp, and I didn't take anything away. She put me right there and made the lead so easy. She was relaxed on the lead, so I took it, and it was good for us. She was relaxed the whole way".

At Churchill Downs on November 2, Newspaperofrecord was one of fourteen fillies to contest the 11th running of the Grade I Breeders' Cup Juvenile Fillies Turf. She was made the 4-5 favourite ahead of the Irish filly Just Wonderful (winner of the Rockfel Stakes) while the other runners included East (Prix Thomas Bryon), Concrete Rose (Jessamine Stakes), La Pelosa (Natalma Stakes) and Lily's Candle (Prix Marcel Boussac). After taking the lead from the start, Newspaperofrecord kicked away from her rivals in the straight and won by six and three quarter lengths from East. After the race Chad Brown said "She showed her class today, her brilliance. She's a hard horse to beat because she has that good positional front-running speed and then she kicks for home like a closer. What a freaky horse!".

=== 2019: three-year-old season ===
Newspaperofrecord made her three-year-old debut on May 5 at Churchill Downs in the Edgewood Stakes. Run at one mile and one sixteenth on turf labelled as "firm", Newspaperofrecord started from the inside post and was made the odds on favorite. She broke on top and held a commanding lead into the far turn, leading by as much as six lengths entering the home stretch. However, she slowed down in the final furlong and was easily run down by Concrete Rose, who had won three of her previous four races, but who had finished 8th in the Breeders Cup Juvenile Turf.

Newspaperofrecord made her next start in the Wonder Again Stakes at Belmont, where she again went to the early lead only to be passed in late stretch to finish second. Brown felt that because of her front-running style, she might be "getting a little lost when she's so alone" turning into the stretch. In her next start on July 6 in the Belmont Oaks Invitational, he asked Ortiz to try to get her to rate behind the front runners. However, Newspaperofrecord became rank and ran wide into the first turn, then veered even wider down the backstretch, interfering with several of the other horses. She finished last behind Concrete Rose.

=== 2020: four-year-old season ===
Newspaperofrecord was given a long layoff then returned on June 6, 2020, in the Intercontinental Stakes, run at a distance of seven furlongs over a yielding turf course at Belmont. She dueled briefly for the early lead with Jakarta, running a quick opening quarter mile in 22.39 seconds. Once Jakarta dropped back into stalking position, Newspaperofrecord relaxed maintained a small advantage over the rest of the field around the turn and then opened up down the stretch to win by 3 3/4 lengths.

== Broodmare career ==
In 2021 Newspaperofrecord became part of the broodmare band for Peter Brant & Coolmore Stud

=== Notable progeny ===
c = colt, f = filly, g = gelding

Foaled	Name	Sex	Major wins
2023	Benvenuto Cellini	c	Golden Fleece Stakes, Irish Derby, Breeders' Cup Turf

== Pedigree ==
Pedigree of Newspaperofrecord (IRE), bay filly, 2016
Sire Lope de Vega (IRE) 2007	Shamardal (USA); 2002	Giant's Causeway	Storm Cat
Sire Lope de Vega (IRE) 2007	Shamardal (USA); 2002	Giant's Causeway	Mariah's Storm
Sire Lope de Vega (IRE) 2007	Shamardal (USA); 2002	Helsinki (GB)	Machiavellian (USA)
Sire Lope de Vega (IRE) 2007	Shamardal (USA); 2002	Helsinki (GB)	Helen Street
Sire Lope de Vega (IRE) 2007	Lady Vettori (GB); 1997	Vettori (IRE)	Machiavellian (USA)
Sire Lope de Vega (IRE) 2007	Lady Vettori (GB); 1997	Vettori (IRE)	Air Distingue (USA)
Sire Lope de Vega (IRE) 2007	Lady Vettori (GB); 1997	Lady Golconda (FR)	Kendor
Sire Lope de Vega (IRE) 2007	Lady Vettori (GB); 1997	Lady Golconda (FR)	Lady Sharp
Dam Sunday Times (GB) 2009	Holy Roman Emperor (IRE); 2004	Danehill (USA)	Danzig
Dam Sunday Times (GB) 2009	Holy Roman Emperor (IRE); 2004	Danehill (USA)	Razyana
Dam Sunday Times (GB) 2009	Holy Roman Emperor (IRE); 2004	L'On Vite (USA)	Secretariat
Dam Sunday Times (GB) 2009	Holy Roman Emperor (IRE); 2004	L'On Vite (USA)	Fanfreluche (CAN)
Dam Sunday Times (GB) 2009	Forever Times (GB); 1998	So Factual (USA)	Known Fact
Dam Sunday Times (GB) 2009	Forever Times (GB); 1998	So Factual (USA)	Sookera
Dam Sunday Times (GB) 2009	Forever Times (GB); 1998	Simply Times (USA)	Dodge
Dam Sunday Times (GB) 2009	Forever Times (GB); 1998	Simply Times (USA)	Nesian's Burn (Family: 9-g)

- Through her sire, Newspaperofrecord was inbred 4 × 4 to Machiavellian, meaning that this stallion appears twice in the fourth generation of her pedigree.
