= Belardo =

Irish-bred Thoroughbred racehorse

- Racing silks of Prince A A Faisal and Godolphin
- Sire: Lope de Vega
- Dam: Danaskaya
- Sex: Stallion
- Foaled: 2 April 2012
- Country: Ireland
- Colour: Bay
- Breeder: Ballylinch Stud
- Owner: Yigit Stud
- Trainer: Roger Varian
- Record: 16: 5-2-1
- Earnings: £899,642

Major wins
- Washington Singer Stakes (2014); Dewhurst Stakes (2014); Doncaster Mile Stakes (2016); Lockinge Stakes (2016)

Awards
- Top-rated European two-year-old (2014)
- Last updated on 14 May 2016

Belardo (foaled 2 April 2012) is an Irish-bred, British-trained Thoroughbred racehorse. A son of Lope de Vega, he is owned in partnership by Prince A. A. Faisal and Godolphin Racing and trained in Newmarket by Roger Varian. In 2014, he won two of his first four races, including the Washington Singer Stakes, before recording an upset victory in the Dewhurst Stakes. He was rated the best two-year-old to race in Europe that year. He failed to win as a three-year-old in 2015 but returned to winning form on his first start of 2016 with victory in the Listed Doncaster Mile Stakes and went on to take the Lockinge Stakes.

== Background ==
Belardo is a bay horse with a white blaze bred in Ireland by the County Kilkenny-based Ballylinch Stud. He is from the first crop of foals sired by the Prix du Jockey Club winner Lope de Vega: other foals from Lope de Vega's first crop included the winners of the Gran Criterium, Sirenia Stakes and Cornwallis Stakes. Belardo's dam Danakaya won only one minor race but was placed in both the Lowther Stakes and the Cheveley Park Stakes. As a descendant of the outstanding racemare Midget, she was distantly related to the 1000 Guineas winner Ma Biche.

In August 2013, the yearling was sent to the Arqana Sale at Deauville where he was bought for €100,000 by Voute Sales Ltd on behalf of the Saudi Prince A. A. Faisal. He was sent into training with Roger Varian at the Kremiln House stable at Newmarket, Suffolk.

== Racing career ==
=== 2014: two-year-old season ===
In his first season, Belardo was ridden in all of his races by Andrea Atzeni who said at the end of the year "I've always liked him. When I first sat on him I said to Roger that he was one of the best two-year-olds I have ever sat on. When I sat on Kingston Hill, he never gave me this sort of feel."

The colt made his racecourse debut at Great Yarmouth Racecourse on June 26 when he started 8/13 favourite for a maiden race over six furlongs. He raced close behind the leaders before moving forward to take the advantage inside the final furlong and went clear in the closing stages to win "readily" by two and a quarter lengths from Heartbreak Hero and six others. Two weeks leader, the colt was moved up sharply in class to contest the Group Two July Stakes at Newmarket Racecourse. Starting the 5/1 second favorite in a field of twelve, he was close behind the leaders for most of the way but was unable to make progress in the final furlong and finished fourth behind Ivawood, Jungle Cat and Muhaarar. Belardo was dropped back to Listed class for the Washington Singer Stakes over seven furlongs at Newbury Racecourse on 16 August. Racing on softer ground, he started 5/4 favourite and won by three and three quarter lengths from Hawkesbury, after accelerating clear of his opponents in the final furlong.

On September 13 at Doncaster Racecourse, Belardo contested the Group Two Champagne Stakes over seven furlongs on good ground and started 3/1 second favourite behind Estidhkaar, a Richard Hannon Jr.-trained colt who had won the Superlative Stakes. He raced in second place but failed to quicken in the closing stages and finished fourth behind Estidhkaar, War Envoy and Aces. Varian later said "He was too fresh... He raced too keen. He raced free for three furlongs and then it turned into a sprint... Andrea was very disappointed". On his final appearance of the season the colt was one of six colts to contest Britain's most prestigious race for two-year-olds, the seven-furlong Dewhurst Stakes, run on soft ground at Newmarket on 17 October. Wearing a hood for the first time he was the 10/1 outsider of the field behind Estidhkaar, Smugglers Cove (Star Appeal Stakes), Maftool (Somerville Tattersall Stakes), Kodi Bear (Winfield Stakes) and Secret Brief (Tattersalls Millions 2-y-o Trophy). Atzeni restrained the colt at the rear of the field as Secret Brief made the running from Kodi Bear. When he moved forward in the final quarter mile he looked unlikely to obtain a clear run, but was then switched right and overtook Kodi Bear a furlong out. Belardo accelerated clear in the closing stages and won by two lengths from Kodi Bear with Smugglers Cove taking third ahead of Estidhkaar. After the race, Varian said "This horse will have confidence going into the winter now. We will now have to dream about the 2000 Guineas. It's a lovely way to end the season... I don't think soft ground is essential but he obviously handles it and he has a very sharp turn of foot, which he showed. He had to be brave and had to squeeze through a gap as well."

Less than two weeks later, Sheikh Mohammed's Godolphin Racing bought a majority share in Belardo. Sheikh Mohammed's bloodstock advisor John Ferguson called him "a lovely horse, full of quality".

=== 2015: three-year-old season ===
On 18 April, Belardo made his first appearance as a three-year-old in the Greenham Stakes over seven furlongs on fast ground at Newbury. Ridden by James Doyle he started the 7/1 third choice in the betting but never looked likely to win and finished eighth of the nine runners behind Muhaarar. On softer ground in the Irish 2,000 Guineas at the Curragh Racecourse on May 23 the colt produced a much better effort to finish fourth of the eleven runners behind Gleneagles, beaten less than two lengths by the winner. In this he was re-equipped with the hood which he had not worn at Newbury. His next three runs were disappointing as he finished unplaced in the Sussex Stakes, the Prix Jacques Le Marois and the Haydock Sprint Cup. He was dropped to Group Two class for the Challenge Stakes at Newmarket on 7 October and finished third, beaten a neck and half a length by Cable Bay and Breton Rock. Ten days later he started a 33/1 outsider for the Queen Elizabeth II Stakes at Ascot. Ridden by Doyle, he produced his best performance of the season, coming from well off the pace to take second place, three quarters of a length behind Solow, with Gleneagles, Kodi Bear, Integral and Elm Park among the beaten horses. Varian commented "I'm delighted the horse has reminded us what a talent he was this time last year. He has turned up and put up a high-level performance again. The horse has made a case for staying in training.".

=== 2016: four-year-old season ===
Belardo began his third season with a win in the Listed Doncaster Mile on 2 April but then finished only fourth behind Toormore when favourite for the Bet365 Mile at Sandown on 22 April. On 14 May Belardo was one of twelve horses to contest the Lockinge Stakes at Newbury Racecourse in which his opponents included Toormore, Euro Charline (Beverly D. Stakes), Limato (Park Stakes), Kodi Bear (Celebration Mile), Dutch Connection (Jersey Stakes) and Gabrial (Lincoln Handicap). Starting at odds of 8/1 he produced a strong late run up the centre of the course to win by a length from Euro Charline with the Irish challenger Endless Drama a neck away in third.

At Royal Ascot Belardo started 9/2 joint-favourite for the Queen Anne Stakes. He proved the best of the European-trained runners but was beaten half a length into second place by the American mare Tepin. He did not race again and was retired at the end of the year.

== Assessment and honours ==
In the International Classification for 2014, Belardo was rated the best two-year-old to have raced in Europe that season with a rating of 119, one pound ahead of the Middle Park Stakes winner Charming Thought and two ahead of the Racing Post Trophy winner Elm Park and the leading fillies Tiggy Wiggy and Found. The Cartier Award winner Gleneagles was a further pound back on 116.

== Stud record ==
Belardo began his career as a breeding stallion at the Kildangan Stud. In his first season he sired the Group race winners Isabella Giles (Rockfel Stakes), Elysium (Weld Park Stakes) and Lullaby Moon (Prix Miesque).

In the 2022 season Belardo stood at Haunui Farm in New Zealand.

=== Notable progeny ===
c = colt, f = filly, g = gelding

| Foaled | Name | Sex | Major Wins |
| 2018 | Gold Phoenix | g | Frank E. Kilroe Mile |
| 2022 | Romanoff | c | New Zealand 2000 Guineas |

== Pedigree ==
Pedigree of Belardo (IRE), bay colt, 2012
| Sire Lope de Vega (IRE) 2007 | Shamardal (USA); 2002 | Giant's Causeway | Storm Cat |
| Sire Lope de Vega (IRE) 2007 | Shamardal (USA); 2002 | Giant's Causeway | Mariah's Storm |
| Sire Lope de Vega (IRE) 2007 | Shamardal (USA); 2002 | Helsinki | Machiavellian |
| Sire Lope de Vega (IRE) 2007 | Shamardal (USA); 2002 | Helsinki | Helen Street |
| Sire Lope de Vega (IRE) 2007 | Lady Vettori (GB); 1997 | Vettori | Machiavellian |
| Sire Lope de Vega (IRE) 2007 | Lady Vettori (GB); 1997 | Vettori | Air Distingue |
| Sire Lope de Vega (IRE) 2007 | Lady Vettori (GB); 1997 | Lady Golconda | Kendor |
| Sire Lope de Vega (IRE) 2007 | Lady Vettori (GB); 1997 | Lady Golconda | Lady Sharp |
| Dam Danaskaya (IRE) 2000 | Danehill (USA); 1986 | Danzig | Northern Dancer |
| Dam Danaskaya (IRE) 2000 | Danehill (USA); 1986 | Danzig | Pas de Nom |
| Dam Danaskaya (IRE) 2000 | Danehill (USA); 1986 | Razyana | His Majesty |
| Dam Danaskaya (IRE) 2000 | Danehill (USA); 1986 | Razyana | Spring Adieu |
| Dam Danaskaya (IRE) 2000 | Majinskaya (FR); 1994 | Marignon | Blushing Groom |
| Dam Danaskaya (IRE) 2000 | Majinskaya (FR); 1994 | Marignon | Madelia |
| Dam Danaskaya (IRE) 2000 | Majinskaya (FR); 1994 | Makarova | Nijinsky |
| Dam Danaskaya (IRE) 2000 | Majinskaya (FR); 1994 | Makarova | Midou (Family: 1-u) |

- Through his sire, Lope de Vega, Belardo is inbred 4 × 4 to Machiavellian, meaning that this stallion appears twice in the fourth generation of his pedigree.
