= 2012 Epsom Derby =

- Derby
- Location: Epsom Downs Racecourse
- Date: 2 June 2012
- Winning horse: Camelot
- Starting price: 8/13 Fav
- Jockey: Joseph O'Brien
- Trainer: Aidan O'Brien
- Owner: Sue Magnier / Michael Tabor / Derrick Smith
- Conditions: Good to firm

Epsom Derby 2012
1-2-3
| Camelot | Main Sequence | Astrology |

Also Ran
4-5-6
| Thought Worthy | Mickdaam | Bonfire |
7-8-9
| Minimise Risk | Rugged Cross | Cavaleiro |

The 2012 Epsom Derby (known as the Investec Derby for sponsorship reasons) was the 23rd annual running of the Derby horse race. It took place at Epsom Downs Racecourse on 2 June 2012.

The race was won by Camelot, the 8/13 favourite ridden by jockey Joseph O'Brien and trained by his father Aidan O'Brien.

As usual, in attendance at Epsom was Queen Elizabeth II to mark the start of a national holiday weekend celebrating her Diamond Jubilee as per official plans announced twelve months prior.

== Race details ==
- Sponsor: Investec
- Winner's prize money: £751,408
- Going: Good to firm
- Number of runners: 9
- Winner's time: 2 minutes, 33.90 seconds

== Full result ==
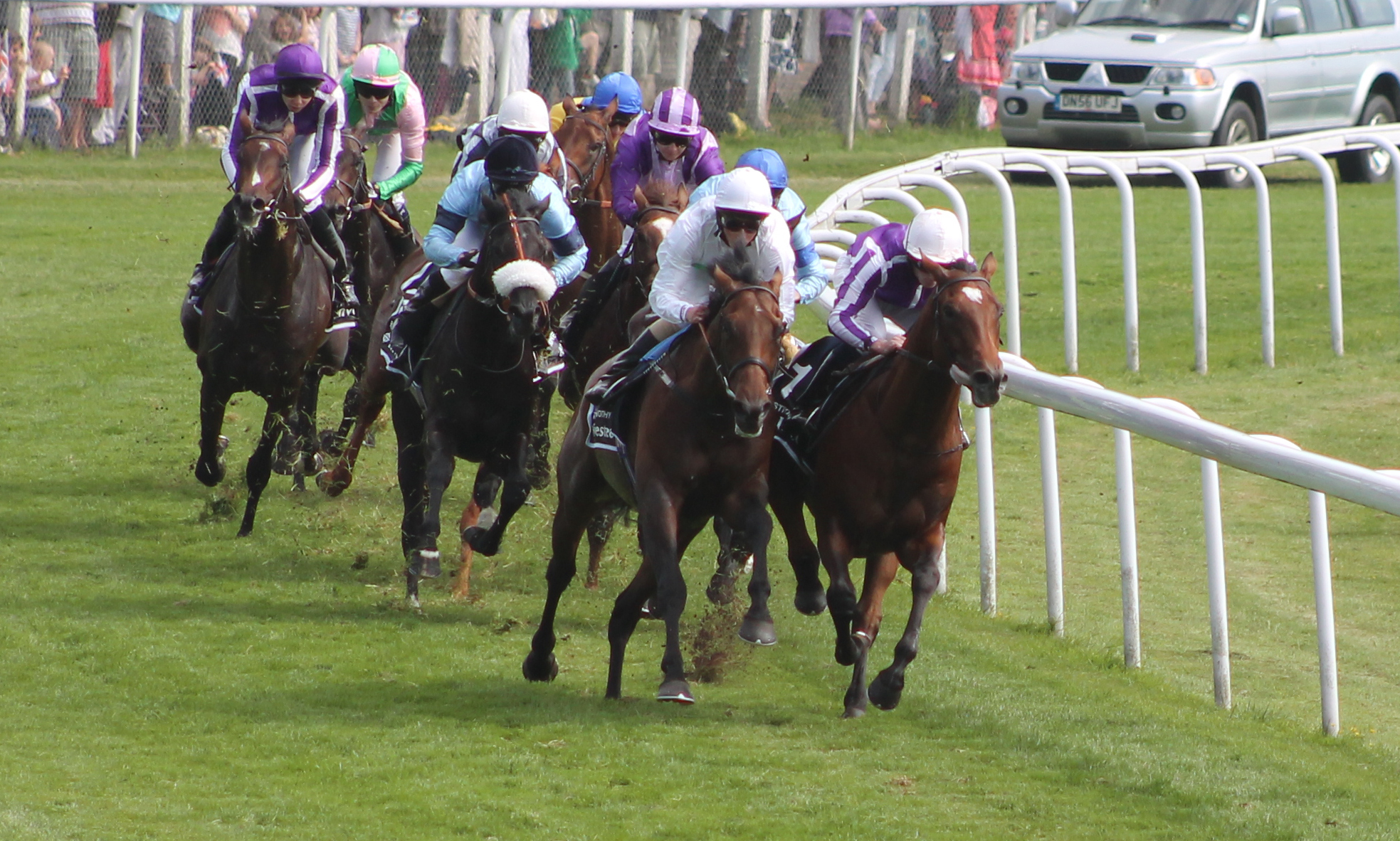
2012 Derby field rounding Tattenham Corner. Camelot is at far left.

| | Dist * | Horse | Jockey | Trainer | SP |
| 1 | | Camelot | Joseph O'Brien | Aidan O'Brien | 8-13 F |
| 2 | 5 | Main Sequence | Ted Durcan | David Lanigan | 9-1 |
| 3 | shd | Astrology | Ryan Moore | Aidan O'Brien | 13-2 |
| 4 | 6 | Thought Worthy | William Buick | John Gosden | 16-1 |
| 5 | 2 | Mickdaam | Paul Hanagan | Richard Fahey | 25-1 |
| 6 | 1 | Bonfire | Jimmy Fortune | Andrew Balding | 9-1 |
| 7 | 1 | Minimise Risk | Jamie Spencer | Andrew Balding | 66-1 |
| 8 | 2 | Rugged Cross | Dane O'Neill | Henry Candy | 33-1 |
| 9 | 4 | Cavaleiro | Hayley Turner | Marcus Tregoning | 25-1 |

== Winner details ==
Further details of the winner, Camelot:

- Foaled: 5 March 2009, in Ireland
- Sire: Montjeu; Dam: Tarfah (Kingmambo)
- Owner: Derrick Smith, Sue Magnier and Michael Tabor
- Breeder: Sheikh Abdulla bin Isa Al-Khalifa

== Form analysis ==
=== Two-year-old races ===
Notable runs by the future Derby participants as two-year-olds in 2011:

- Camelot – 1st in Racing Post Trophy
- Bonfire - 3rd in Critérium International

=== The road to Epsom ===
Early-season appearances in 2012 and trial races prior to running in the Derby:

- Camelot – 1st in 2,000 Guineas Stakes
- Cavaleiro - 3rd in Lingfield Derby Trial
- Bonfire – 1st in Dante Stakes
- Astrology – 1st in Dee Stakes
- Main Sequence – 1st in Lingfield Derby Trial
- Mickdaam – 4th in UAE Derby; 1st in Chester Vase
- Minimise Risk - 5th in Chester Vase
- Rugged Cross - 3rd in Fairway Stakes
- Thought Worthy - 1st in Fairway Stakes

=== Subsequent Group 1 wins ===
Group 1 / Grade I victories after running in the Derby:

- Camelot – Irish Derby (2012)
- Main Sequence - United Nations Stakes (2014), Sword Dancer Invitational Handicap (2014), Joe Hirsch Turf Classic Invitational Stakes (2014), Breeders' Cup Turf (2014)

== Subsequent breeding careers ==
Leading progeny of participants in the 2012 Epsom Derby.

=== Sires of Classic winners ===
Camelot (1st)

- Latrobe - 1st Irish Derby (2018)
- Even So - 1st Irish Oaks (2020)
- Athena - 1st Belmont Oaks (2018)
- Sir Erec - 1st Spring Juvenile Hurdle (2019)

=== Other Stallions ===
Astrology (3rd) - Exported to Saudi Arabia
Minimise Risk (7th) - Exported to America - Exported to Venezuela
