= Brametot (horse) =

Irish-bred racehorse

- Sire: Rajsaman
- Grandsire: Linamix
- Dam: Morning Light
- Damsire: Law Society
- Sex: Stallion
- Foaled: 24 February 2014
- Country: Ireland
- Colour: Bay
- Breeder: Jorge Cardemil de Rurange
- Owner: Gerard Augustin-Normand & Mme E Vidal; Gerard Augustin-Normand & Al Shaqab Racing
- Trainer: Jean-Claude Rouget
- Record: 10: 6-1-0
- Earnings: £1,275,045

Major wins
- Grand Critérium de Bordeaux (2016); Prix de Fontainebleau (2017); Poule d'Essai des Poulains (2017); Prix du Jockey Club (2017)

Brametot (foaled 24 February 2014) is an Irish-bred, French-trained Thoroughbred racehorse. He showed considerable promise as a two-year-old in 2016 when he won three of his four races including the Listed Grand Critérium de Bordeaux. In the first half of his three-year-old campaign he developed into a top-class performer, winning the Prix de Fontainebleau, Poule d'Essai des Poulains and Prix du Jockey Club. He was beaten in three subsequent races although he ran well to finish fifth in the Prix de l'Arc de Triomphe.

== Background ==
Brametot is a bay horse with no white markings bred in Ireland by Jorge Cardemil de Rurange. In December 2014 he was put up for auction at the Arqana December Breeding Stock sale and was bought for €26,000 by Sylvain Vidal. He entered the ownership of Gerard Augustin-Normand & Mme E Vidal and was sent into training with Jean-Claude Rouget at Pau. He was ridden in all of his races by Cristian Demuro

He is from the first crop of foals sired by Rajsaman, a top-class performer who won the Prix Perth, Prix du Muguet and Prix Daniel Wildenstein. Brametot's dam Morning Light won two races in her native Germany and was a half-sister to Monsun.

== Racing career ==
=== 2016: two-year-old season ===
Brametot began his racing career in a contest for previously unraced juveniles over 1200 metres on soft ground at Deauville Racecourse on 17 June in which he started at odds of 6.8/1 and won by two lengths from the André Fabre-trained Xaarino. On 2 August at the same track, the colt started favourite for a race over 1500 metres and won by four lengths from Incampo and five others. At the end of the month Brametot started odds-on favourite for a race over 1600 metres at Deauville but was outpaced in the closing stages and was beaten three lengths into second place by High Alpha. The colt ended his season in the Listed Grand Critérium de Bordeaux over 1600 metres at Bordeaux Le Bouscat Racecourse on 11 October. Starting the 7/10 favourite he disputed the lead from the start, went to the front 600 metres from the finish and stayed on well to win by one and a half lengths from Samuna.

=== 2017: three-year-old season ===
In 2017 Longchamp Racecourse was closed for redevelopment and the racecourse's major fixtures were moved to other tracks. Brametot made his first appearance of the season in the Group 3 Prix de Fontainebleau, run that year over 1600 metres at Chantilly Racecourse on 16 April and started the 4.1/1 fourth choice in the betting behind Xaarino, Markazi (Prix Omnium II) and Spotify. Brametot started poorly and was detached from the field in last place in the early stages but made steady progress and moved into contention in the straight. He took the lead 200 metres from the finish and drew away to win "comfortably" by two and a half lengths from Stunning Spirit. After the race Jean-Claude Rouget, whose stable had been affected by a viral infection said "After what we have been through these past few weeks, it shows how you can be down one day and up the next... I know he was a little far back in the race, but that is the only way to ride him as he’d otherwise be too keen. Cristian rode him perfectly, he made his progress in stages and let him roll at the end." Shortly after the race a half-share in the colt's ownership was purchased by the Qatar-based Al Shaqab Racing.

The 2017 edition of the Group 1 Poule d'Essai des Poulains was run over 1600 metres at Deauville on 14 May and saw Brametot start the 4/1 second favourite behind the Prix Jean-Luc Lagardère winner National Defense. The other eleven runners included Rivet, Orderofthegarter (Leopardstown 2,000 Guineas Trial Stakes), Peace Envoy (Anglesey Stakes), South Seas (Solario Stakes) and Spotify. After racing towards the rear of the field Brametot made rapid progress on the stands-side approaching the last 200 metres, overtook Rivet and then got the better of Le Brivido in the final strides to win by a short head. Rouget commented "He should stay further and he won today because of his stamina. I'm delighted for the new owner partnership and for my team, as I had not won this race before. We will now take our time to decide on his future.

At Chantilly on 4 June Brametot started the 13/8 favourite for the Prix du Jockey Club over 2000 metres at Chantilly. His eleven opponents included Recoletos (Prix Greffulhe), Rivet, Waldgeist, Soleil Marin (Prix Noailles), War Decree (Vintage Stakes) and Orderofthegarter. Brametot started slowly and raced towards the rear of the field as Taj Mahal set the pace, before being switched to the outside to make his challenge in the straight. He produced a sustained run to overtake Recoletos 50 metres from the finish and caught Waldgeist on the line to win by a short head. Rouget said "It's huge. I almost did not run in this race, but Churchill frightened me in the St James's Palace Stakes. So we tried, but between trying and succeeding, there is a difference. It is all the more beautiful after the virus that touched one of my barns... The colt will have a rest this summer and we haven't set any precise objectives for the autumn yet" while Demuro commented "He started off slowly, like he is used to, and I had a hard time following. I was a little caught for speed in the turn, but he finished really strongly. He is a very hard horse, very strong – a true Group 1 horse.

After a break of two and a half months Brametot returned to the track in the Group 2 Prix Guillaume d'Ornano over 2000 metres at Deauville on 15 August in which he started the 1.3/1 favourite but never recovered from a poor start and came home fifth of the eight runners behind the British-trained Eminent. On 1 October the colt started a 20/1 outsider for the Prix de l'Arc de Triomphe over 2400 metres at Chantilly. He tracked the leaders for most of the way and kept on well in the straight to finish fifth behind Enable, Cloth of Stars, Ulysses and Order of St George. Three weeks later Brametot was sent to England to contest the Champion Stakes over ten furlongs at Ascot Racecourse. He went off the 11/2 third choice in the betting but after moving into contention two furlongs from the finish he tired badly on the soft ground and came home sixth behind Cracksman, beaten almost fifteen lengths by the winner.

In the 2017 World's Best Racehorse Rankings, Brametot was rated at 121 making him the twenty-ninth best horse in the world.

== Stud record ==
At the end of his racing career Brametot was retired to become a breeding stallion at the Haras de Bouquetot before moving to the Gestut Ebbesloh in Germany for the 2020 season.

=== Notable progeny ===
c = colt, f = filly, g = gelding

Foaled	Name	Dam	Sex	Major wins
2022	Nicoreni	Nouvelle Neige	f	Preis der Diana

== Pedigree ==
Pedigree of Brametot (IRE), bay stallion, 2014
Sire Rajsaman (FR) 2007	Linamix (FR); 1987	Mendez	Bellypha (IRE)
Sire Rajsaman (FR) 2007	Linamix (FR); 1987	Mendez	Miss Carina
Sire Rajsaman (FR) 2007	Linamix (FR); 1987	Lunadix	Breton (GB)
Sire Rajsaman (FR) 2007	Linamix (FR); 1987	Lunadix	Lutine (GB)
Sire Rajsaman (FR) 2007	Rose Quartz (GB); 1997	Lammtarra (USA)	Nijinsky (CAN)
Sire Rajsaman (FR) 2007	Rose Quartz (GB); 1997	Lammtarra (USA)	Snow Bride
Sire Rajsaman (FR) 2007	Rose Quartz (GB); 1997	Graphite (USA)	Mr. Prospector
Sire Rajsaman (FR) 2007	Rose Quartz (GB); 1997	Graphite (USA)	Stellarette (CAN)
Dam Morning Light (GER) 1997	Law Society (USA); 1982	Alleged	Hoist The Flag
Dam Morning Light (GER) 1997	Law Society (USA); 1982	Alleged	Princess Pout
Dam Morning Light (GER) 1997	Law Society (USA); 1982	Bold Bikini	Boldnesian
Dam Morning Light (GER) 1997	Law Society (USA); 1982	Bold Bikini	Ran-Tan
Dam Morning Light (GER) 1997	Mosella (GER); 1985	Surumu	Literat
Dam Morning Light (GER) 1997	Mosella (GER); 1985	Surumu	Surama
Dam Morning Light (GER) 1997	Mosella (GER); 1985	Monasia	Authi (IRE)
Dam Morning Light (GER) 1997	Mosella (GER); 1985	Monasia	Monacensia (Family: 8-a)
