= Shiva (horse) =

Japanese-bred Thoroughbred racehorse

- Sire: Hector Protector
- Grandsire: Woodman
- Dam: Lingerie
- Damsire: Shirley Heights
- Sex: Mare
- Foaled: 22 April 1995
- Country: Japan
- Colour: Chestnut
- Breeder: Northern Farm
- Owner: Niarchos Family
- Trainer: Henry Cecil
- Record: 10: 4-1-1
- Earnings: £173,280

Major wins
- Earl of Sefton Stakes (1999); Tattersalls Gold Cup (1999); Brigadier Gerard Stakes (2000)

Shiva (born 22 April 1995) was a Japanese-bred, British-trained Thoroughbred racehorse and broodmare. In a racing career which was delayed and repeatedly interrupted by training problems she won four of her ten races between May 1998 and October 2000. Unraced as a two-year-old, she won her only start at three and emerged as a top-class middle distance performer in the spring of 1999 with wins in the Earl of Sefton Stakes and Tattersalls Gold Cup and went on to finish second in the Champion Stakes in autumn. As a five-year-old she recorded an emphatic win in the Brigadier Gerard Stakes and then finished third in a strongly contested edition of the Eclipse Stakes. After her retirement from racing she had some success as a dam of winners.

== Background ==
Shiva was a chestnut mare with a narrow white blaze bred in Japan by Northern Farm in partnership with Stavros Niarchos. During her racing career she was trained in Newmarket, Suffolk by Henry Cecil. She raced in the colours of the Niarchos Family who inherited the racing and breeding interests of Stavros Niarchos when the Greek shipping tycoon died in 1996.

She was sired by Hector Protector, an American-bred stallion who won five Group 1 races in France including the Gran Criterium, Poule d'Essai des Poulains and Prix Jacques Le Marois. He was owned and bred by Stavros Niarchos but was sold at towards the end of his racing career and was retired to stud in Japan. Her dam, Lingerie, failed to win a race but was a daughter of Northern Trick, a mare who won the Prix Vermeille and finished second in the Prix de l'Arc de Triomphe. Lingerie became a very successful broodmare who produced Light Shift and was the female-line ancestor of Main Sequence and Cloth of Stars.

== Racing career ==
=== 1998: three-year-old season ===
Shiva was slow to mature and did not race as a two-year-old. She made her racecourse debut on 30 May 1998 when she started 7/4 favourite for a maiden race over nine furlongs at Kempton Park Racecourse. Ridden by Kieren Fallon she took the lead two furlongs from the finish and won by two lengths from the Michael Stoute-trained Shalama. The filly subsequently developed injury problems with her knees and did not race again that year.

=== 1999: four-year-old season ===
After 10 1/2 months off the track, Shiva returned in the Group 3 Earl of Sefton Stakes over 8 1/2 furlongs at Newmarket Racecourse on 14 April 1999. The race was run on the July Course as the Rowley Mile Course was closed for redevelopment. Despite her lengthy absence and the sharp rise in class she started the 7/1 fourth choice in the betting behind Haami (winner of the Darley Stakes), White Heart (Doncaster Mile) and Handsome Ridge (Prix Perth). After starting slowly she began to make rapid progress in the last quarter mile, took the lead inside the final furlong and won by one and a quarter lengths from Haami. Another significant step up in class followed when the filly was sent to Ireland for the Group 1 Tattersalls Gold Cup over 10 1/2 furlongs at the Curragh on 23 May. With Fallon in the saddle she started the 100/30 second favourite behind Daylami with the best of the other four runners appearing to be Insatiable (Prix Dollar) and Second Empire (Grand Critérium). She raced in fourth place before overtaking Daylami to go to the front a furlong out and kept on well to win by 2 1/2 lengths. Henry Cecil commented "Shiva has had problems all her life, mostly with her knees, but I asked Maria Niarchos if I could keep her because I thought she would be a Group 1 horse. It is nice to be proved right. She is still a little bit green – this was only her third race – and I would think the Prince Of Wales's Stakes will be next. She should go on improving and will probably get a mile and a half".

Willie Ryan took the ride when Shiva started second favourite behind Chester House in the Prince of Wales's Stakes at Royal Ascot on 15 June. The filly never looked like winning and came home seventh of the eight runners, twelve lengths behind the winner Lear Spear, a horse she had beaten easily in the Earl of Sefton. Another long break followed before Shiva returned for the Champion Stakes at Newmarket on 16 October and started favourite despite the presence of the 1998 winner Alborada and The Derby winner High-Rise. Ridden by Richard Quinn she stayed on well in the last quarter mile but was beaten into second place by Alborada.

=== 2000: five-year-old season ===
On her first run of 2000 Shiva started favourite to repeat her 1999 success in the Earl of Sefton Stakes but finished unplaced behind Indian Lodge. On heavy ground at Sandown Park on 30 May Shiva started favourite for the Group 3 Brigadier Gerard Stakes against seven opponents including Border Arrow and Beat All both of whom had finished third in the Epsom Derby (in 1998 and 1999 respectively) as well as Elle Danzig (Bayerisches Zuchtrennen), Lady In Waiting (Sun Chariot Stakes) and Diamond White (Prix de l'Opéra). After racing second place, Shiva took the lead approaching the last quarter mile and quickly drew eight lengths clear of her opponents. She was eased down by Quinn in the final furlong and came home 1 1/2 lengths in front of Border Arrow. Henry Cecil commented "She is a cracking mare. She must have easy going though. Last year she jarred herself up at Royal Ascot and was four gallops short before she ran in the Champion Stakes where she still managed to finish second. On this showing we now know how to ride her – dominate!".

In the Eclipse Stakes on 8 July, over the same course and distance as the Brigadier Gerard, Shiva was beaten but produced arguably her best performance. Despite being hampered inside the final furlong she finished third to Giant's Causeway and Kalanisi with Sakhee and Fantastic Light in fourth and fifth. Three weeks later she was moved up in distance for the King George VI and Queen Elizabeth Stakes over 1 1/2 miles at Ascot but finished tailed off in last place behind Montjeu. As in 1999 Shiva took a long break before returning in the Champion Stakes. On her final racecourse appearance, she took the lead half a mile from the finish but faded in the last two furlongs and finished ninth of the fifteen runners behind Kalanisi.

== Breeding record ==
At the end of her racing career, Shiva was retired to become a broodmare for the Niachos Family's Flaman Holdings breeding operation. She produced ten foals and three winners.

- Eccentricity, a chestnut filly, foaled in 2002, sired by Kingmambo. Failed to win in two races.
- Yiri Yiri, chestnut colt, 2003, by Rahy
- Yangon, chestnut colt (later gelded), 2006, by Storm Cat. Won one race.
- Tymora, chestnut filly, 2007, by Giant's Causeway. Failed to win in five races.
- Mahayogin, bay colt (gelded), 2008, by Dixie Union. Failed to win in twenty races.
- Trimurti, bay filly, 2009, by Harlan's Holiday. Failed to win in two races.
- Bapak Muda, chestnut colt (gelded), 2010, by Distorted Humor. Won two races.
- Flare of Firelight, filly, 2011, by Birdstone. Failed to win in three races.
- That Which Is Not, dark bay or brown filly, 2013, Elusive Quality. Won three races including Listed Prix Zarkava.
- Sputnik Planum, bay colt, 2014, by Elusive Quality. Failed to win in five races.

== Pedigree ==
Pedigree of Shiva (JPN), chestnut mare, 1995
Sire Hector Protector (USA) 1988	Woodman (USA); 1983	Mr. Prospector	Raise a Native
Sire Hector Protector (USA) 1988	Woodman (USA); 1983	Mr. Prospector	Gold Digger
Sire Hector Protector (USA) 1988	Woodman (USA); 1983	Playmat	Buckpasser
Sire Hector Protector (USA) 1988	Woodman (USA); 1983	Playmat	Intriguing
Sire Hector Protector (USA) 1988	Korveya (USA); 1982	Riverman	Never Bend
Sire Hector Protector (USA) 1988	Korveya (USA); 1982	Riverman	River Lady
Sire Hector Protector (USA) 1988	Korveya (USA); 1982	Konafa	Damascus
Sire Hector Protector (USA) 1988	Korveya (USA); 1982	Konafa	Royal Statute
Dam Lingerie (GB) 1988	Shirley Heights (GB); 1975	Mill Reef	Never Bend
Dam Lingerie (GB) 1988	Shirley Heights (GB); 1975	Mill Reef	Milan Mill
Dam Lingerie (GB) 1988	Shirley Heights (GB); 1975	Hardiemma	Hardicanute
Dam Lingerie (GB) 1988	Shirley Heights (GB); 1975	Hardiemma	Grand Cross
Dam Lingerie (GB) 1988	Northern Trick (USA); 1981	Northern Dancer	Nearctic
Dam Lingerie (GB) 1988	Northern Trick (USA); 1981	Northern Dancer	Natalma
Dam Lingerie (GB) 1988	Northern Trick (USA); 1981	Trick Chick	Prince John
Dam Lingerie (GB) 1988	Northern Trick (USA); 1981	Trick Chick	Fast Line (Family 4-m)

- Shiva was inbred 4 × 4 to Never Bend, meaning that this stallion appears twice in the fourth generation of her pedigree.
