= 2017 Prix de l'Arc de Triomphe =

- Location: Chantilly Racecourse
- Date: October 1, 2017
- Winning horse: Enable

The 2017 Prix de l'Arc de Triomphe was a horse race held at Chantilly on Sunday 1 October 2017. The race could not take place at its usual venue at Longchamp Racecourse as that course was closed in 2016 for major redevelopment. It was the 96th running of the Prix de l'Arc de Triomphe. The race was won by Khalid Abdullah's three-year-old filly Enable, trained in England by John Gosden and ridden by Frankie Dettori. It was a record-breaking fifth win in the race for Dettori after wins on Lammtarra, Sakhee, Marienbard and Golden Horn. Gosden was winning the race for the second time, while Khalid Abdulla was recording his fifth win in the race. Enable became the first British-trained filly to win the Arc and the sixth female winner in the last seven runnings of the race.

== The contenders ==
The three-year-old British-trained filly Enable was regarded as the most likely winner after six consecutive wins including the Epsom Oaks, Irish Oaks, King George VI and Queen Elizabeth Stakes and Yorkshire Oaks. The only other British runner was the four-year-old Ulysses who had finished second to Enable in the King George and won both the Eclipse Stakes and the International Stakes.

Japan was represented by Satono Diamond, a four-year-old colt who had won the Kikuka Sho and the Arima Kinen in Japan but had run poorly in the Prix Foy on his most recent start. He was accompanied by his less-regarded stablemate Satono Noblesse. Germany sent two horses, both of whom were established Group 1 performers: Dschingis Secret had won the Grosser Preis von Berlin before taking the Prix Foy, while Iquitos had recorded victories in the Grosser Preis von Baden and the Bayerisches Zuchtrennen.

The Irish contingent consisted of five runners from the Aidan O'Brien stable. The stable jockey Ryan Moore opted to ride the filly Winter (1000 Guineas, Irish 1000 Guineas, Coronation Stakes, Nassau Stakes) but the betting market preferred the outstanding stayer Order of St George who had finished third in the race in 2016. The other three O'Brien runners were Capri (Irish Derby, St Leger), Seventh Heaven and Idaho.

None of the seven French-trained horses was particularly well-fancied: the best of the "home team" appeared to be Brametot, who had won the Poule d'Essai des Poulains and Prix du Jockey Club earlier in the year and the four-year-old Cloth of Stars (Prix Ganay). The only other French horse to start at odds of less than 80/1 was the Grand Prix de Saint-Cloud winner Zarak.

Enable was made the 10/11 favourite ahead of Order of St George on 8/1 with Ulysses and Winter both on 9/1. The best fancied of the other runners was Dschingis Secret on 14/1, with Brametot, Capri and Cloth of Stars next in the betting on 20/1.

== The race ==
Enable and Ulysses broke quickly from the inside but Idaho soon went to the front while Order of St George quickly moved up into second. Enable briefly looked likely to be trapped on the rail by the two O'Brien horses but Dettori pulled the filly back and then settled in third. Brametot also raced well along the inside while Winter, Dschingis Secret and Cloth of Stars were restrained in mid-division. Idaho led the field into the straight from Order of St George but Enable switched left and moved up to dispute the lead 400 metres from the finish and then accelerated clear of the field. Idaho soon dropped away but Order of St George maintained his gallop without being able to quicken. Ulysses, who had tracked Enable for most of the race stayed on well but the best finish came from Cloth of Stars, who produced a powerful late run on the outside. Enable, however, never looked in any danger and won by two and a half lengths. Cloth of Stars took second ahead of Ulysses with Order of St George, Brametot and Dschingis Secret filling the next three places.

== Full result ==
Pos.	Marg.	Horse	Age	Jockey	Trainer (Country)
1		Enable	3	Frankie Dettori	John Gosden (GB)
2	2½	Cloth of Stars	4	Mickael Barzalona	André Fabre (FR)
3	1¾	Ulysses	4	Jim Crowley	Michael Stoute (GB)
4	1½	Order of St George	5	Donnacha O'Brien	Aidan O'Brien (IRE)
5	1¼	Brametot	3	Cristian Demuro	Jean-Claude Rouget (FR)
6	½	Dschingis Secret	4	Adrie de Vries	Markus Klug (GER)
7	hd	Iquitos	5	Andrasch Starke	Hans-Jürgen Gröschel (GER)
8	nse	Idaho	4	Seamie Heffernan	Aidan O'Brien (IRE)
9	nk	Winter	3	Ryan Moore	Aidan O'Brien (IRE)
10	¾	Zarak	4	Christophe Soumillon	Alain de Royer-Dupré (FR)
11	nk	One Foot In Heaven	5	James Doyle	Alain de Royer-Dupré (FR)
12	nk	Doha Dream	4	Gregory Benoist	André Fabre (FR)
13	1½	Plumatic	3	Maxime Guyon	André Fabre (FR)
14	½	Seventh Heaven	4	Pat Smullen	Aidan O'Brien (IRE)
15	hd	Satono Diamond	4	Christophe Lemaire	Yasutoshi Ikee (JPN)
16	½	Satono Noblesse	4	Yuga Kawada	Yasutoshi Ikee (JPN)
17	1	Capri	3	Wayne Lordan	Aidan O'Brien (IRE)
18	20	Silverwave	5	Pierre-Charles Boudot	Pascal Bary (FR)

- Abbreviations: ns = nose; shd = short-head; hd = head; snk = short neck; nk = neck

== Race details ==
- Sponsor: Qatar Racing and Equestrian Club
- Purse:5.000.000 €
- Going: Soft
- Distance: 2,400 metres
- Number of runners: 18
- Winner's time: 2:28.69
