= Fairway Stakes =

Flat horse race in Britain

- Class: Listed
- Location: Rowley Mile; Newmarket, England
- Inaugurated: 1998
- Race type: Flat / Thoroughbred
- Sponsor: Betway
- Website: Newmarket

Race information
- Distance: 1m 2f (2,012m)
- Surface: Turf
- Track: Straight
- Qualification: Three-year-olds excluding Group winners
- Weight: 9 st 3 lb Allowances; 5 lb for fillies Penalties; 4 lb for Listed winners * since 31 August 2018
- Purse: £40,000 (2019); 1st: £22,684

Fairway Stakes
2022
Ottoman Fleet	Zain Sarinda	Savvy Victory

Previous years
2021
John Leeper	Tasman Bay	Fancy Man

2020-2011
2020
Volkan Star	Thunderous	Do You Love Me
2019
Raise You	Eightsome Reel	Al Hilalee
2018
Old Persian	Court House	Department of War
2017
Grey Britain	Desert Skyline	Call To Mind
2016
Steel of Madrid	Linguistic	Tathqeef
2015
Peacock	Mustadeem	Tannaaf
2014
Pinzolo	Master Carpenter	Truth Or Dare
2013
Hoarding	Tha'ir	Jammy Guest
2012
Thought Worthy	Noble Mission	Rugged Cross
2011
Laajooj	Buthelezi	Cai Shen

2010-2001
2010
Green Moon	Red Badge	Miss Starlight
2009
Palavicini	Father Time	Big Bound
2008
Unnefer	Pampas Cat	Age of Reason
2007
Lucarno	Supersonic Dave	Hearthstead Maison
2006
Red Rocks	Degas Art	Markovitch
2005
David Junior	Hallhoo	Glen Ida
2004
Hazyview	Duke of Venice	Castleton
2003
Sabre d'Argent	Rocket Force	Roskilde
2002
Bustan	Al Moulatham	Fraulein
2001
Potemkin	Aldwych	Demophilos

2000-1998
2000
Shamrock City	Subtle Power	Port Vila
1999
Manndar	Tissifer	Deal Fair
1998
Royal Anthem	Kilimanjaro	Sensory

The Fairway Stakes is a Listed flat horse race in Great Britain open to three-year-old horses. It is run over a distance of 1 mile and 2 furlongs (2,012 metres) on the Rowley Mile at Newmarket in May.

== History ==
The event is named after Fairway, a successful Newmarket-trained racehorse in the 1920s. It was established in 1998, and was initially held on the July Course. The first running was won by Royal Anthem.

The Fairway Stakes was switched to the Rowley Mile in 2000.

== Records ==
Leading jockey (4 wins):

- William Buick – Thought Worthy (2012), Old Persian (2018), Volkan Star (2020), John Leeper (2021)

Leading trainer (4 wins):

- Charlie Appleby - Pinzolo (2014), Old Persian (2018), Volkan Star (2020), Ottoman Fleet (2022)

== Winners ==
Year	Winner	Jockey	Trainer	Time
1998	Royal Anthem	Kieren Fallon	Henry Cecil	2:02.20
1999	Manndar	Gérald Mossé	Luca Cumani	2:08.85
2000	Shamrock City	Philip Robinson	Paul Howling	2:02.61
2001	Potemkin	Dane O'Neill	Richard Hannon Sr.	2:04.98
2002	Bustan	Richard Hills	Marcus Tregoning	2:05.94
2003	Sabre d'Argent	Frankie Dettori	David Loder	2:08.60
2004	Hazyview	Eddie Ahern	Neville Callaghan	2:04.42
2005	David Junior	Richard Hills	Brian Meehan	2:07.66
2006	Red Rocks	Jimmy Fortune	Brian Meehan	2:05.90
2007	Lucarno	Jimmy Fortune	John Gosden	2:04.79
2008	Unnefer	Ted Durcan	Henry Cecil	2:10.37
2009	Palavicini	Eddie Ahern	John Dunlop	2:05.30
2010	Green Moon	Jamie Spencer	Harry Dunlop	2:06.77
2011	Laajooj	Mickael Barzalona	Mahmood Al Zarooni	2:03.70
2012	Thought Worthy	William Buick	John Gosden	2:04.31
2013	Hoarding	Robert Havlin	John Gosden	2:02.83
2014	Pinzolo	Silvestre de Sousa	Charlie Appleby	2:05.64
2015	Peacock	Richard Hughes	Richard Hannon Jr.	2:03.76
2016	Steel of Madrid (Note: Steel of Madrid was later exported to Australian and renamed Calderon)	Tom Queally	Richard Hannon Jr.	2:09.77
2017	Grey Britain	Gérald Mossé	John Ryan	2:08.44
2018	Old Persian	William Buick	Charlie Appleby	2:05.22
2019	Raise You	David Probert	Andrew Balding	2:05.21
2020 (Note: The 2020 race was run in June due to the COVID-19 pandemic in the United Kingdom)	Volkan Star	William Buick	Charlie Appleby	2:01.08
2021	John Leeper	William Buick	Ed Dunlop	2:09.53
2022	Ottoman Fleet	James Doyle	Charlie Appleby	2:04.88

== See also ==
- Horse racing in Great Britain
- List of British flat horse races
