= Ulysses (horse) =

Irish-bred Thoroughbred racehorse

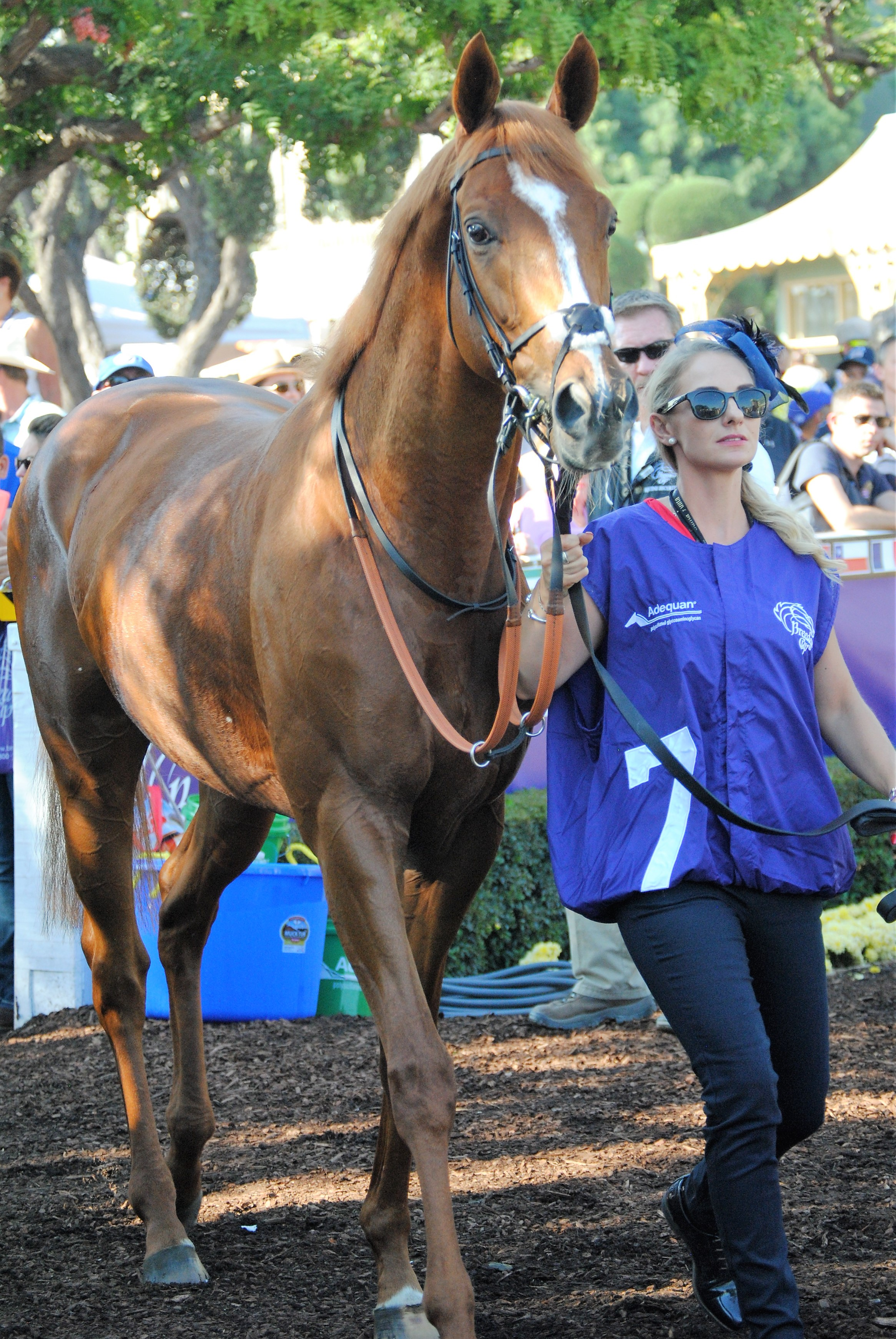
- Ulysses before the 2016 Breeders' Cup Turf
- Sire: Galileo
- Grandsire: Sadler's Wells
- Dam: Light Shift
- Damsire: Kingmambo
- Sex: Stallion
- Foaled: 20 March 2013
- Country: Ireland
- Colour: Chestnut
- Breeder: Flaxman Stables Ireland Ltd
- Owner: Flaxman Stables Ireland Ltd
- Trainer: Michael Stoute
- Record: 13: 5-3-2
- Earnings: $2,544,053

Major wins
- Gordon Stakes (2016); Gordon Richards Stakes (2017); Eclipse Stakes (2017); International Stakes (2017)

Awards
- Cartier Champion Older Horse (2017)

Ulysses (foaled 20 March 2013) is an Irish-bred, British-trained Thoroughbred racehorse and breeding stallion. As a three-year-old he showed very good form, winning the Gordon Stakes and finishing fourth in the Breeders' Cup Turf. He was even better in 2017 when he took the Gordon Richards Stakes and went on to record Group 1 victories in the Eclipse Stakes and the International Stakes.

== Background ==
Ulysses is a chestnut horse with a narrow white blaze bred in Ireland by his owners Flaxman Stables Ireland Ltd a company owned by the family of the late Stavros Niarchos. The colt was sent into training with Michael Stoute at his Freemason Lodge Stables in Newmarket, Suffolk.

He was sired by Galileo, who won the Derby, Irish Derby and King George VI and Queen Elizabeth Stakes in 2001. Galileo is now one of the world's leading stallions and has been champion sire of Great Britain and Ireland eight times so far. His other progeny include Cape Blanco, Frankel, Golden Lilac, Nathaniel, New Approach, Rip Van Winkle, Found, Minding and Ruler of the World. Ulysses' dam Light Shift was a top-class performer who won The Oaks in 2007. She was a half-sister to Shiva and a close relative of Main Sequence.

== Racing career ==
=== 2015: two-year-old season ===
Ulysses made his racecourse debut on 23 October in a maiden race over one mile at Newbury Racecourse in which he started at odds of 4/1 and finished sixth of the fifteen runners, two and three quarter lengths behind the winner Algometer.

=== 2016: three-year-old season ===
Ulysses began his second campaign by finishing second in a maiden race over ten furlongs at Leicester Racecourse in April and then started odds-on favourite for a similar event at Newbury on 13 May. Ridden by Ryan Moore, he took the lead three furlongs out and went clear of his ten opponents to win "very easily" by eight lengths.

Such was the impression made by the colt's win at Newbury that Ulysses was regarded as a serious contender when he was stepped up sharply in class to contest the 2016 Epsom Derby on 4 June. He started the 8/1 fourth choice in the betting but never looked likely to win and tired in the closing stages to finish twelfth of the sixteen runners behind Harzand. The colt was off the course for over seven weeks before returning in the Group Three Gordon Stakes at Goodwood Racecourse on 27 July in which he started 9/2 second favourite behind his stablemate Platitude. Ridden by Andrea Atzeni he was restrained in the early stages but took the lead approaching the final furlong and won by half a length from the Aidan O'Brien-trained The Major General.

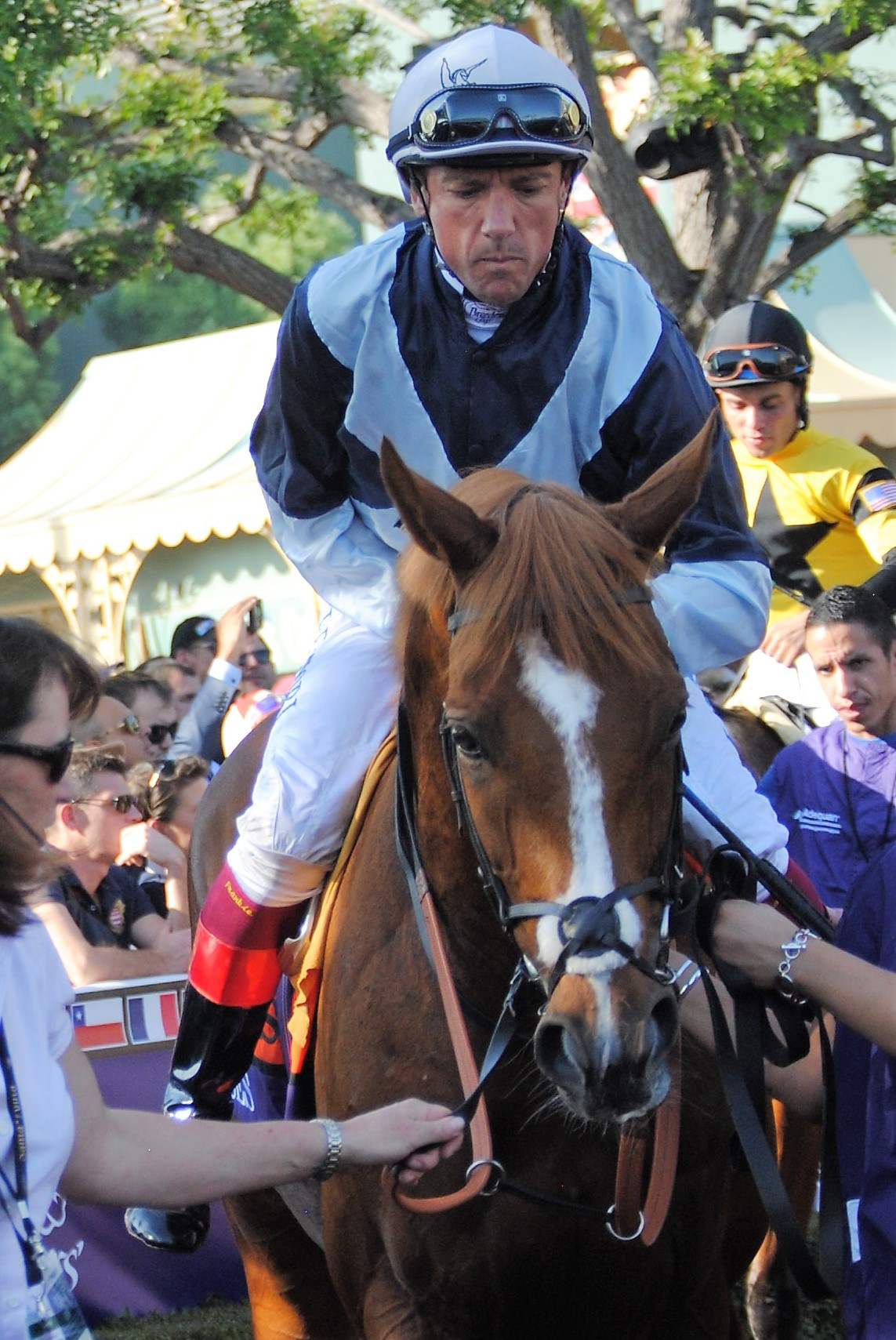
Ulysses with Frankie Dettori

At the end of August Ulysses started odds-on favourite for the Winter Hill Stakes at Windsor Racecourse but was unable to overhaul the four-year-old filly Chain of Daisies and was beaten a short head. The colt ended his second season with a journey to the California to contest the Breeders' Cup Turf at Santa Anita Park on 5 November. Racing against world-class older horses he finished fourth behind Highland Reel, Flintshire and Found.

=== 2017: four-year-old season ===
On his first appearance as a four-year-old, Ulysses was partnered by Atzeni in the Gordon Richards Stakes at Sandown Park on 28 April and started 3/1 second favourite behind My Dream Boat in a field which also included Royal Artillery (Rose of Lancaster Stakes) and Deauville (Belmont Derby). He was settled in sixth place before taking the lead a furlong out and won by a length from Deauville despite hanging left in the closing stages.

In the Prince of Wales's Stakes Royal Ascot in June Ulysses took the lead a furlong out but was overtaken in the closing stages and finished third behind Highland Reel and the Tattersalls Gold Cup winner Decorated Knight. Jim Crowley took the ride when Ulysses started at odds of 8/1 for the Eclipse Stakes on good to firm ground at Sandown on 8 July. The Derby runner-up Cliffs of Moher started favourite ahead of Barney Roy (St James's Palace Stakes) while the other six runners included Decorated Knight, Eminent (Craven Stakes, fourth in the Derby) and Lightning Spear (Celebration Mile). He was towards the rear or the field for most of the way as the outsider Taj Mahal set the pace, but began to make rapid progress on the outside in the straight. He went to the front a furlong out and fought off a persistent challenge from Barney Roy to prevail by a nose in a photo finish. Stoute, who was winning the race for a record sixth time commented "He's an admirable horse. He's only ever had one blip and that was in the Derby, when he got knocked over twice. He's very consistent, and today the first two came right away from the third".

Three weeks after his win at Sandown Ulysses was stepped up in distance for the King George VI and Queen Elizabeth Stakes over one and a half miles on good to soft ground at Ascot. He proved no match for the three-year-old filly Enable but came home in second place, ahead of Idaho, Highland Reel, My Dream Boat and Jack Hobbs. In the International Stakes at York Racecourse on 23 August Ulysses started at odds of 4/1 in a seven-runner field. He faced several old rivals including Barney Roy, Cliffs of Moher, Decorated Knight and My Dream Boat but the favourite for the race was the 2000 Guineas winner Churchill. Crowley tracked the leaders before moving his mount forward to take the lead a furlong out. Ulysses stayed on strongly in the closing stages to win by two lengths and a neck from Churchill and Barney Roy. After the race Stoute said "We’ve become very fond of this horse. It all went so smoothly – there was never a blip. It was his best performance so far. It's now time to give him a break." He went on to name the Breeders' Cup as the horse's likely end of year target.

In late September it was announced that Ulysses would be retired from racing at the end of the season and would begin his career as a breeding stallion at the Cheveley Park Stud at Newmarket.

== Assessment and awards ==
On 16 November 2017 at the Cartier Racing Awards, Ulysses was named Champion Older Horse.

In the 2017 World's Best Racehorse Rankings, Ulysses was rated the sixth-best horse in the world and the best older horse in Europe.

=== Notable progeny ===
The data below is based on Racing Post Bloodstock.

c = colt, f = filly, g = gelding

Foaled	Name	Sex	Major Wins
2020	White Birch	c	Tattersalls Gold Cup

== Pedigree ==
Pedigree of Ulysses (IRE), chestnut colt, 2013
Sire Galileo (IRE) 1998	Sadler's Wells (USA); 1981	Northern Dancer	Nearctic
Sire Galileo (IRE) 1998	Sadler's Wells (USA); 1981	Northern Dancer	Natalma
Sire Galileo (IRE) 1998	Sadler's Wells (USA); 1981	Fairy Bridge	Bold Reason
Sire Galileo (IRE) 1998	Sadler's Wells (USA); 1981	Fairy Bridge	Special
Sire Galileo (IRE) 1998	Urban Sea (USA); 1989	Miswaki	Mr. Prospector
Sire Galileo (IRE) 1998	Urban Sea (USA); 1989	Miswaki	Hopespringseternal
Sire Galileo (IRE) 1998	Urban Sea (USA); 1989	Allegretta	Lombard
Sire Galileo (IRE) 1998	Urban Sea (USA); 1989	Allegretta	Anatevka
Dam Light Shift (USA) 2004	Kingmambo (USA); 1990	Mr. Prospector	Raise a Native
Dam Light Shift (USA) 2004	Kingmambo (USA); 1990	Mr. Prospector	Gold Digger
Dam Light Shift (USA) 2004	Kingmambo (USA); 1990	Miesque	Nureyev
Dam Light Shift (USA) 2004	Kingmambo (USA); 1990	Miesque	Pasadoble
Dam Light Shift (USA) 2004	Lingerie (GB); 1988	Shirley Heights	Mill Reef
Dam Light Shift (USA) 2004	Lingerie (GB); 1988	Shirley Heights	Hardiemma
Dam Light Shift (USA) 2004	Lingerie (GB); 1988	Northern Trick	Northern Dancer
Dam Light Shift (USA) 2004	Lingerie (GB); 1988	Northern Trick	Trick Chick (Family 4-m)

- Ulysses in inbred 3 × 4 to Northern Dancer and Mr. Prospector, meaning that each of these stallions appears in both the third and fourth generations of his pedigree.
