= Blue Bunting (horse) =

American-bred Thoroughbred racehorse

- Racing silks of Godolphin
- Sire: Dynaformer
- Grandsire: Roberto
- Dam: Miarixa
- Damsire: Linamix
- Sex: Mare
- Foaled: 20 March 2008
- Country: United States
- Colour: Grey
- Breeder: B. M. Kelley
- Owner: Godolphin
- Trainer: Mahmood Al Zarooni
- Record: 8: 5-1-0
- Earnings: £645,463

Major wins
- 1000 Guineas (2011); Irish Oaks (2011); Yorkshire Oaks (2011)

Blue Bunting (foaled 20 March 2008) is an American-bred, British-trained thoroughbred racehorse which won the classic 1000 Guineas at Newmarket Racecourse in 2011. In a racing career which lasted from July 2010 until September 2011 she won five of her eight races. After winning two of her three races in 2010, she was an upset winner of the 1000 Guineas on her first start as a three-year-old. She was beaten when favourite for The Oaks but returned to record further Group One successes in the Irish Oaks and the Yorkshire Oaks. She ran poorly in the St Leger in autumn and was retired from racing after sustaining an injury early in 2012.

== Background ==
Blue Bunting is a grey filly bred in Kentucky by B. M. Kelley. In August 2009, the yearling filly was consigned to the Saratoga sales where she was bought for $200,000 by Anthony Stroud, acting on behalf of Godolphin Racing. Her sire was the American stallion Dynaformer whose other progeny include Barbaro, Americain and Lucarno.

== Racing career ==
=== 2010: two-year-old season ===
Blue Bunting ran three times as a two-year-old and was ridden on each occasion by Ahmed Ajtebi. On her debut at Newmarket Racecourse on 30 July she finished second in a seven furlong maiden race, five lengths behind the winner Theysken's Theory. Two weeks later she was moved up in distance for a one-mile maiden at Doncaster Racecourse. She started the 6/4 favourite and recorded her first win by beating Midnight Caller by half a length. On 30 October, Blue Bunting stepped up in class to contest the Listed Montrose Stakes at Newmarket. She was sent to the front in the straight, and after being overtaken she rallied "gamely" to regain the lead and win by a length from the favourite Elas Diamond.

=== 2011: three-year-old season ===
As part of the Godolphin team, Blue Bunting spent the winter being prepared in Dubai before being returned to Newmarket in spring. As both her breeding and style of racing suggested that she would be most effective at middle distances, and she was not among the leading fancies for the 1000 Guineas, which was run over the Rowley Mile course at Newmarket on 1 May. The French-trained filly Moonlight Cloud was made 9/2 favourite in a field of eighteen runners, with Blue Bunting, ridden by Frankie Dettori starting at 16/1. Blue Bunting looked outpaced in the early stages and was towards the back of the field until half way. She then began to make progress along the rail, taking the lead well inside the final furlong and winning by three-quarters of a lengths from the Aidan O'Brien-trained Together. Dettori described the win as a "great and pleasant surprise" and pointed out that the filly had been particularly well-suited by the strong pace.

On 3 June Blue Bunting was moved up in distance to contest the Investec Oaks over one and a half miles at Epsom Downs Racecourse. She started the 9/4 favourite ahead of the O'Brien runners Wonder of Wonders and Misty For Me. She turned into the straight in seventh place but when switched to the outside to obtain a clear run she could make little impression on the leaders and finished fourth to the 20/1 outsider Dancing Rain. Dettori eased the filly down in the closing stages, losing third place on the line, and receiving a suspension from riding as result. In July Blue Bunting started second favourite for the Irish Oaks at the Curragh. She was not among the leaders until the final furlong, but then made rapid progress on the outside to catch Banimpire in the last strides and won by a short head. A month later, she raced against older fillies and mares for the first time in the Yorkshire Oaks. Starting the 11/4 favourite, she took the lead in the final furlong and won by three-quarters of a length from the four-year-old Vita Nova.

Blue Bunting was matched against colts for the first time in the Ladbrokes St Leger Stakes at Doncaster Racecourse in September. In a field of nine runners she started the 7/2 second favourite behind the Michael Stoute-trained Sea Moon. She was never in serious contention and finished sixth behind Masked Marvel.

== Breeding record ==
Blue Bunting returned to Dubai for the winter and was prepared for a run in the Dubai Sheema Classic. In February she sustained a leg injury in training and was officially retired from racing. She was bred to Street Cry in 2012.

2013 BLUE CREEK (GB) : Bay gelding, foaled 22 February, by Street Cry (IRE) – won once and placed twice from three starts at Meydan, UAE 2016.

2014 BLUE ILLUSION (GB) : Bay filly, foaled 25 February, by Dubawi (IRE) – won 1 race and placed once from 8 starts in England and France.

2015 FLAG FESTIVAL (GB): Grey gelding, foaled 9 March, by New Approach (IRE) – won 1 race from 6 starts England to date.

2016 BLUE MOUNTAIN(GB): Grey gelding, foaled 8 May, by Dansili (GB) – placed three times from 7 starts.

== Pedigree ==
Pedigree of Blue Bunting (USA), grey mare, 2008
Sire Dynaformer (USA) 1985	Roberto (USA); 1969	Hail to Reason	Turn-To
Sire Dynaformer (USA) 1985	Roberto (USA); 1969	Hail to Reason	Nothirdchance
Sire Dynaformer (USA) 1985	Roberto (USA); 1969	Bramalea	Nashua
Sire Dynaformer (USA) 1985	Roberto (USA); 1969	Bramalea	Rarelea
Sire Dynaformer (USA) 1985	Andover Way (USA); 1978	His Majesty	Ribot
Sire Dynaformer (USA) 1985	Andover Way (USA); 1978	His Majesty	Flower Bowl
Sire Dynaformer (USA) 1985	Andover Way (USA); 1978	On The Trail	Olympia
Sire Dynaformer (USA) 1985	Andover Way (USA); 1978	On The Trail	Golden Trail
Dam Miarixa (FR) 2001	Linamix (FR); 1987	Mendez	Bellypha
Dam Miarixa (FR) 2001	Linamix (FR); 1987	Mendez	Miss Carina
Dam Miarixa (FR) 2001	Linamix (FR); 1987	Lunadix	Breton
Dam Miarixa (FR) 2001	Linamix (FR); 1987	Lunadix	Lutine
Dam Miarixa (FR) 2001	Mrs Arkada (FR); 1991	Akarad	Labus
Dam Miarixa (FR) 2001	Mrs Arkada (FR); 1991	Akarad	Licata
Dam Miarixa (FR) 2001	Mrs Arkada (FR); 1991	Mrs Annie	Bolkonski
Dam Miarixa (FR) 2001	Mrs Arkada (FR); 1991	Mrs Annie	Miss Satin (Family:4-n)
