= Cloth of Stars =

Irish-bred Thoroughbred racehorse

- Racing silks of Godolphin
- Sire: Sea the Stars
- Grandsire: Cape Cross
- Dam: Strawberry Fledge
- Damsire: Kingmambo
- Sex: Stallion
- Foaled: 6 April 2013
- Country: Ireland
- Colour: Bay
- Breeder: Peter Anastasiou
- Owner: Daniel "Danny" Lee, Godolphin
- Trainer: André Fabre
- Record: 20: 7-4-6
- Earnings: £497,104

Major wins
- Prix des Chênes (2015); Prix La Force (2016); Prix Greffulhe (2016); Prix Exbury (2017); Prix d'Harcourt (2017); Prix Ganay (2017)

Cloth of Stars (foaled 6 April 2013) is an Irish-bred, French-trained Thoroughbred racehorse. He showed good ability as a two-year-old in 2015, winning the Prix des Chênes and being placed in both the Prix de Condé and the Critérium de Saint-Cloud. In the following spring he won the Prix La Force and the Prix Greffulhe before finishing eighth when strongly fancied for the 2016 Epsom Derby.

== Background ==
Cloth of Stars is a bay horse bred in Ireland by Peter Anastasiou. He is from the third crop of foals sired by Sea the Stars who won the 2000 Guineas, Epsom Derby and Prix de l'Arc de Triomphe in 2009. His other have included Taghrooda and Sea The Moon. Cloth of Stars's dam Strawberry Fledge never raced, but was a granddaughter of the outstanding racemare Northern Trick whose other descendants have included Light Shift, Main Sequence and Dodging Bullets.

In October 2014 the yearling colt was sent to the Tattersalls sales and was bought for 400,000 guineas by John Ferguson Bloodstock on behalf of Sheikh Mohammed's Godolphin organisation. Despite his price he was only the fifth most expensive horse that John Ferguson (subsequently Godolphin's Chief Executive and Racing Manager) bought for the Sheikh at the sale. He was sent into training with André Fabre in France and has been ridden in all of his races by Mickael Barzalona.

== Racing career ==
=== 2015: two-year-old season ===
Cloth of Stars began his racing career in the Prix de Montaigu for unraced colt and geldings over 1600 metres at Deauville Racecourse on 22 August. Starting the 1.9/1 favourite in a twelve-runner field he took the lead 300 metres from the finish and won "readily" by three quarters of a length from Atlantide. Three weeks later he was stepped up in class for the Group Three Prix des Chênes over 1600 metres at Longchamp Racecourse He started second favourite behind the Aga Khan's Vedevani with the other two runners being Sixth Sense (Winkfield Stakes) and Marasquin. He raced in second before taking the lead in the last 200 metres and winning by one and a quarter lengths from Vedevani. Cloth of Stars started odds-on favourite for the Prix de Condé over 1800 metres at Chantilly Racecourse but sustained his first defeat as he pulled hard in the early stages and finished third to the British-trained Robin of Navan. Cloth of Stars met Robin of Navan again in the Group One Critérium de Saint-Cloud over 2000 metres on 1 November when the two colts started second and third in the betting behind the Aidan O'Brien-trained Idaho. After being restrained towards the rear of the field Cloth of Stars made steady progress in the straight and finished second to Robin of Navan.

=== 2016: three-year-old season ===
On his first run as a three-year-old, Cloth of Stars started the 7/10 favourite for the Group Three Prix La Force over 2000 metres at Saint-Cloud Racecourse on 8 April. Racing on heavy ground he appeared to be under pressure in the straight but stayed on well to take the lead 200 metres out and won by one and a quarter lengths from Viserano. Five weeks later, over the same course and distance, Cloth of Stars met Robin of Navan for the third time, when the colts started joint favourites for the Group Two Prix Greffulhe. After racing at the rear of the five-runner field, Cloth of Stars began to make progress in the last 300 metres. He overtook his rival 120 metres from the finish before drawing away to win by two and a half lengths. After the race John Ferguson said "I had a word with André Fabre afterwards and our thinking is to go for the Epsom Derby. We will have to supplement him for the Epsom Derby which is the same weekend as the Prix du Jockey Club, so everything depends on how Cloth Of Stars trains between now and then. Today's victory was over a mile and a quarter, but both Mickael Barzalona and Andre said the colt will be suited by a mile and half. Cloth Of Stars is also the kind of horse to act on the course at Epsom and improving all the time, winning going away today."

On 31 May Godolphin paid a supplementary fee of £75,000 to enter Cloth of Stars in the Epsom Derby. Four days later Cloth of Stars started 8/1 fourth choice in a sixteen-runner field for the Derby. He tracked the pacemaker Port Douglas and turned into the straight in second place before taking the lead approaching the final quarter mile. He was soon overtaken and faded badly to finish eighth, sixteen lengths behind the winner Harzand.

=== 2017: four-year-old season ===
In January 2017, Daniel Lee, a US Born businessman based in Monte Carlo, bought a large share of the horse for an undisclosed amount. A spokesperson stated to Equida that the horse would stay with André Fabre for 2017.

On Sunday 19 March 2017, Cloth Of Stars made his season debut in the Group 3 Prix Exbury at Saint-Cloud. Mickael Barzalona was on board as the pair accounted for eight rivals including the E P Taylor Stakes third Banzari and William Muir's Restorer who finished last. Restrained in midfield early, the son of Sea the Stars quickened to put the bed in the straight and win by a comfortable length and a quarter from Star Victory. "He had conditions to suit", Barzalona told www.paris-turf.com. "He quickened really well in the finish. He's a super horse who answers every question." Trainer André Fabre praised connections for allowing him to keep the horse in training in France. Cloth Of Stars was completing a double on the card for trainer André Fabre & owner Danny Lee, following the debut success of Lady Frankel in the opener.

== Assessment and honours ==
In the 2017 World's Best Racehorse Rankings, Cloth of Stars was rated the seventh-best horse in the world and the best horse trained in France. He was also rated world Champion older stayer in 2017

== Pedigree ==
Pedigree of Cloth of Stars (IRE), bay colt, 2013
| Sire Sea the Stars (IRE) 2006 | Cape Cross (IRE); 1994 | Green Desert | Danzig |
| Sire Sea the Stars (IRE) 2006 | Cape Cross (IRE); 1994 | Green Desert | Foreign Courier |
| Sire Sea the Stars (IRE) 2006 | Cape Cross (IRE); 1994 | Park Appeal | Ahonoora |
| Sire Sea the Stars (IRE) 2006 | Cape Cross (IRE); 1994 | Park Appeal | Balidaress |
| Sire Sea the Stars (IRE) 2006 | Urban Sea (USA); 1989 | Miswaki | Mr. Prospector |
| Sire Sea the Stars (IRE) 2006 | Urban Sea (USA); 1989 | Miswaki | Hopespringseternal |
| Sire Sea the Stars (IRE) 2006 | Urban Sea (USA); 1989 | Allegretta | Lombard |
| Sire Sea the Stars (IRE) 2006 | Urban Sea (USA); 1989 | Allegretta | Anatevka |
| Dam Strawberry Fledge (USA) 2005 | Kingmambo (USA); 1990 | Mr. Prospector | Raise a Native |
| Dam Strawberry Fledge (USA) 2005 | Kingmambo (USA); 1990 | Mr. Prospector | Gold Digger |
| Dam Strawberry Fledge (USA) 2005 | Kingmambo (USA); 1990 | Miesque | Nureyev |
| Dam Strawberry Fledge (USA) 2005 | Kingmambo (USA); 1990 | Miesque | Pasadoble |
| Dam Strawberry Fledge (USA) 2005 | Lingerie (IRE); 1988 | Shirley Heights | Mill Reef |
| Dam Strawberry Fledge (USA) 2005 | Lingerie (IRE); 1988 | Shirley Heights | Hardiemma |
| Dam Strawberry Fledge (USA) 2005 | Lingerie (IRE); 1988 | Northern Trick | Northern Dancer |
| Dam Strawberry Fledge (USA) 2005 | Lingerie (IRE); 1988 | Northern Trick | Trick Chick (Family 4-m) |

- Cloth of Stars in inbred 3 × 4 to Mr. Prospector, meaning that this stallion appears in both the third and fourth generation of his pedigree.
