= Rewilding (horse) =

British Thoroughbred racehorse

- Racing colours of Godolphin
- Sire: Tiger Hill
- Grandsire: Danehill
- Dam: Darara
- Damsire: Top Ville
- Sex: Stallion
- Foaled: 23 February 2007
- Country: Great Britain
- Colour: Bay
- Owner: Sheikh Mohammed; Godolphin Stables
- Trainer: André Fabre; Mahmood Al Zarooni
- Record: 10: 5-2-1
- Earnings: £2,455,418

Major wins
- Cocked Hat Stakes (2010); Great Voltigeur Stakes (2010); Dubai Sheema Classic (2011); Prince of Wales's Stakes (2011)
- Last updated on December 9, 2006

Rewilding (23 February 2007 – 23 July 2011) was a thoroughbred racehorse. He won races at Royal Ascot and in Dubai. His finest hour came when winning the 2011 Prince Of Wales Stakes, beating Australian superstar So You Think. As a 3-year-old he won the Cocked Hat Stakes at Goodwood and the Great Voltigeur Stakes at York.

Rewilding was put down after the King George VI and Queen Elizabeth Stakes at the Betfair Weekend at Ascot Racecourse on Saturday, 23 July 2011. The horse tripped and broke its leg, throwing jockey Frankie Dettori to the ground. The jockey received no serious injuries in the incident.

== Background ==
Rewilding was sired by the Irish-bred, German-trained horse Tiger Hill out of Darara. Tiger Hill won three Group One races and finished third in the Prix de l'Arc de Triomphe. Since retiring to stud he has sired the winners of over a hundred races including Oriental Tiger (Gerling-Preis), Iota (Preis der Diana) and Königstiger (Gran Criterium). Darara was a top-class racemare, winning the Prix Vermeille in 1986 and was a half-sister to the Prix du Jockey Club winner and notable sire Darshaan. She has been a highly successful broodmare producing, apart from Rewilding, the Group One winners Dar Re Mi, Darazari (Ranvet Stakes) and River Dancer (Queen Elizabeth II Cup).

Rewilding was bred at the Watership Down Stud, near Sydmonton, Berkshire. As a yearling he was sent to the Tattersalls sales where he was bought for 500,000 gns by John Ferguson Bloodstock representing Sheikh Mohammed.

== Racing career ==
=== 2009: two-year-old season ===
Rewilding was sent into training with André Fabre and made his debut at Longchamp in October when he finished a neck second to Handsome Devil in the Prix de Belleville. Three weeks later, he recorded his first win when beating three previous winners in the Prix Coaraze at Maisons-Laffitte Racecourse.

=== 2010: three-year-old season ===
Rewilding made his three-year-old debut in the Group Two Prix Noailles at Longchamp. Ridden by Mixime Guyon he stayed on strongly in the straight to finish one and a half lengths second to Planteur, five lengths clear of the rest of the field. After this race Sheikh Mohammed transferred him to the Godolphin Racing team. He was sent to be trained in England by Mahmood Al Zarooni in England to be prepared for The Derby.

On his first English start, he was made evens favourite for the Listed Cocked Hat Stakes at Goodwood, a recognised Derby Trial. Frankie Dettori who rode Rewilding in all his starts from this point on, tracked the leaders on Rewilding, before moving the colt to the lead a furlong out. Rewilding went clear and pulled away to win "easily" by four lengths.

At Epsom, Rewilding was made 9/2 second favourite behind the Aidan O'Brien-trained Jan Vermeer. He was slowly away and towards the rear for most of the race, before making steady progress in the straight to finish third, seven and a half lengths behind Workforce.

Rewilding was off the course for two and a half months before re-appearing in the Great Voltigeur Stakes at York. Dettori held the colt up in the early stages before sending him into the lead a furlong out. Rewilding soon went clear and won impressively by four lengths from Midas Touch.

On his final start of the season, Rewilding was made an even-money favourite for the St Leger over one mile six and a half furlongs at Doncaster. As on his previous starts, Rewilding was held up before challenging in the straight. On this occasion, however, he was unable to reach the lead and faded in the closing stages to finish sixth behind Arctic Cosmos.

=== 2011: four-year-old season ===
In the winter of 2010–2011, Rewilding moved to Dubai with the rest of the Godolphin team. His first target was the Sheema Classic on Dubai World Cup night at Nad Al Sheba. As usual, the race attracted an international field, with runners from Britain, Hong Kong, South Africa, France, Saudi Arabia, Japan and the United States. Rewilding started favourite and won "comfortably", pulling clear in the closing stages to win by three and three-quarter lengths.

On his return to England, Rewilding was sent to Royal Ascot for the Prince of Wales's Stakes in which he was matched against the Australasian champion So You Think. The rest of the field included Planteur, Jan Vermeer, Twice Over and Debussy, but So You Think, who had won both his starts in Ireland in spring was sent off the 4/11 favourite. Ryan Moore sent So You Think into the lead two furlongs out and made a long run for home. As most of his rivals began to struggle, Dettori brought Rewilding up on the outside to challenge. So You Think and Rewilding raced alongside each other throughout the final furlong, with Rewilding pulling ahead in the final strides to win by a neck.

On his final start, Rewilding was made 3/1 second favourite for the King George VI and Queen Elizabeth Stakes at Ascot. Dettori held him up in last place before moving up to challenge in the straight. Two furlongs from the finish, Rewilding veered sharply left and fell heavily. He immediately returned to his feet but had sustained a broken leg and was put down on the course.

== Assessment ==
In the 2010 World Thoroughbred Rankings Rewilding was assessed at 121, making him the equal twenty-sixth best horse in the world, and the twelfth best three-year-old.

At the time of his death, he was rated the third best racehorse in the world and the best in the Intermediate distance division. At the end of the season he was given a rating of 127, placing him fourth in the 2011 World Thoroughbred Rankings.
