= Camelot (horse) =

British-bred, Irish-trained Thoroughbred racehorse

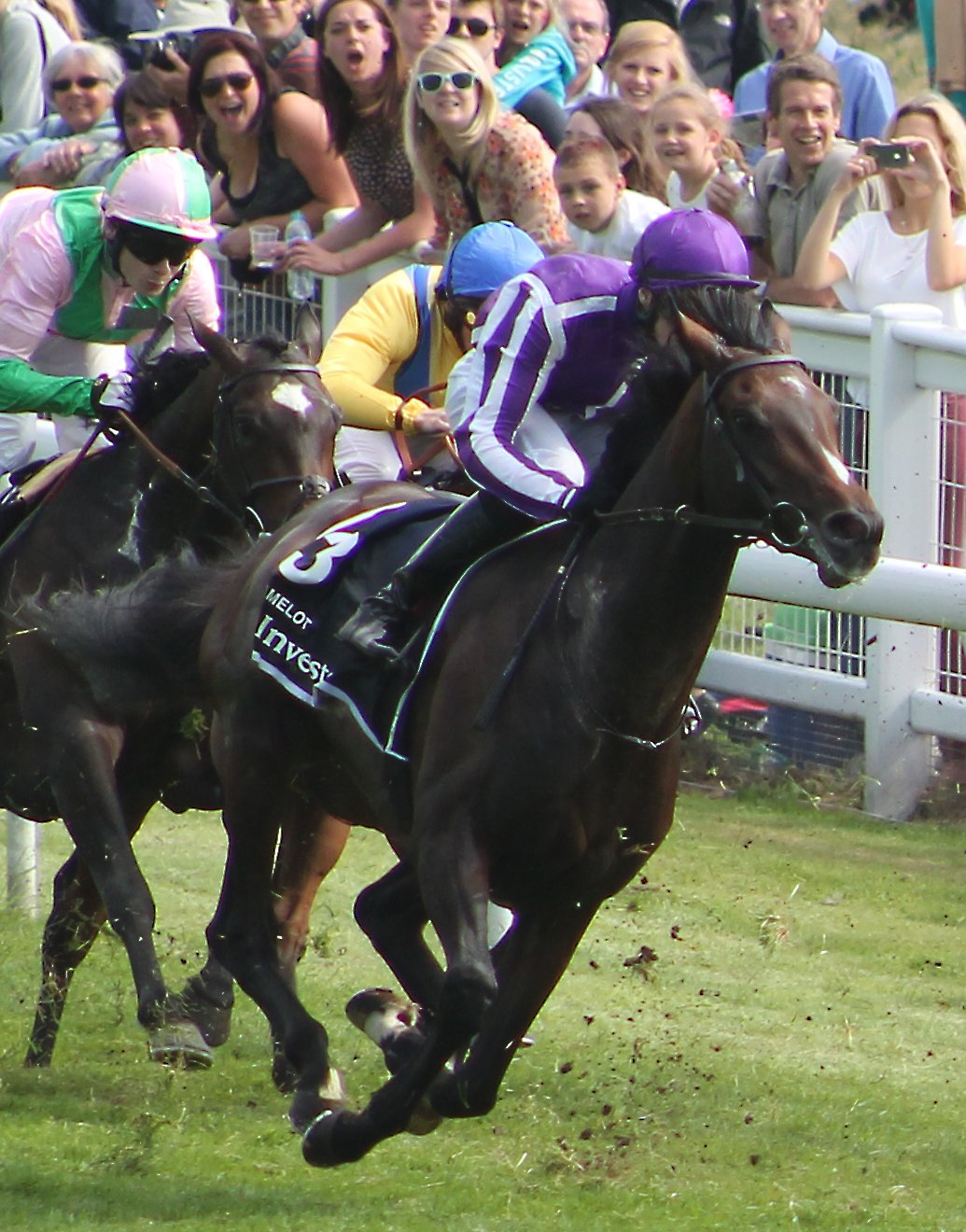
- Camelot at 2012 Epsom Derby
- Sire: Montjeu
- Grandsire: Sadler's Wells
- Dam: Tarfah
- Damsire: Kingmambo
- Sex: Stallion
- Foaled: 15 March 2009
- Country: United Kingdom
- Colour: Bay
- Breeder: Sheikh Abdulla Bin Isa Al-Khalifa
- Owner: Derrick Smith, Mrs John Magnier, Michael Tabor
- Trainer: A P O'Brien
- Record: 10:6-2-0
- Earnings: £1,710,766

Major wins
- Racing Post Trophy (2011); 2000 Guineas (2012); Epsom Derby (2012); Irish Derby (2012)

Awards
- European Champion Three-Year-Old Colt (2012); Irish Horse of the Year (2012); Timeform rating: 128

Camelot (foaled 15 March 2009) is a British-bred, Irish-trained thoroughbred racehorse. He was one of the leading European two-year-olds of 2011 and won the Racing Post Trophy at Doncaster. On his three-year-old debut in 2012, Camelot won the 2000 Guineas at Newmarket and followed up by winning the Derby at Epsom and the Irish Derby at the Curragh. His bid for the Triple Crown failed narrowly when he finished runner-up in the St Leger.

== Background ==
Camelot is a dark-coated bay horse with an interrupted white stripe, bred by Sheikh Abdulla Bin Isa Al-Khalifa. The colt was reared at the Highclere Stud near Newbury in Berkshire, where his "paddock playmate" was a foal who went on to be named Bonfire. In October 2010, Camelot was sent as a yearling to the Tattersalls sales at Newmarket, where he was bought for 525,000 guineas by the bloodstock agent Dermot "Demi" O'Byrne on behalf of the Coolmore organisation. Like most Coolmore horses, he was sent into training with Aidan O'Brien at Ballydoyle. For racing purposes, Camelot is registered as being owned by Derrick Smith, Mrs John Magnier and Michael Tabor.

Camelot is one of many top-class horses sired by Montjeu. Others include the Derby winners Motivator, Authorized and Pour Moi, the St Leger winners Scorpion and Masked Marvel, and the Prix de l'Arc de Triomphe winner Hurricane Run. Camelot's dam, the Kentucky-bred Tarfah, was a good racemare who won the Group Three Dahlia Stakes in 2004.

Aidan O'Brien, commenting on the horse's earliest appearance in the exercise said, "With him it's natural, it's the way he is. His movement is perfection"

== Racing career ==
=== 2011: two-year-old season ===
Camelot made his first appearance in a maiden race at Leopardstown on 14 July 2011. Starting at odds of 1/3, he was restrained in the early stages by Joseph O'Brien (his trainer's son) before taking the lead in the final furlong and winning "easily" by two lengths from All Approved. Despite the modest nature of the race, Camelot was immediately made favourite for the following year's Epsom Derby. He was then moved directly into Group One class as he made his next appearance in the Racing Post Trophy at Doncaster, where he went off the odds on favourite. He was again held up by Joseph O'Brien before taking the lead in the closing stages and winning by 2¼ lengths in "very impressive" style. Following the race, his Derby odds were cut to 3/1. Aidan O'Brien said that the colt had "looked extraordinary all the way along" and was "unbelievable at home." He also explained that while most regarded the Derby as the colt's main objective, the 2000 Guineas was also a target.

=== 2012: three-year-old season ===
==== Spring ====
In early 2012, Camelot maintained his position as favourite for both the 2000 Guineas and the Derby, despite O'Brien expressing doubts about the colt's participation in the former race. On his three-year-old debut, Camelot, ridden again by Joseph O'Brien, started the 15/8 favourite the 2000 Guineas at Newmarket on 5 May. After being towards the rear of the field in the early running, he accelerated to take the lead in the closing stages and won by a neck from French Fifteen. After the race, Aidan O'Brien said, "It's one of those unbelievable days... we always thought he was very special" and indicated that the Derby would probably be Camelot's next race. Joseph O'Brien, who gave the colt a "cool" and "supremely confident" ride according to The Daily Telegraph said that the race went "pretty much to plan". Camelot became a shorter-priced favourite for the Derby. O'Brien pointed out that the colt's breeding and temperament made him potentially well-suited for the race but explained that "the thing with Epsom is, you never really know these things until you go there."

==== Summer ====
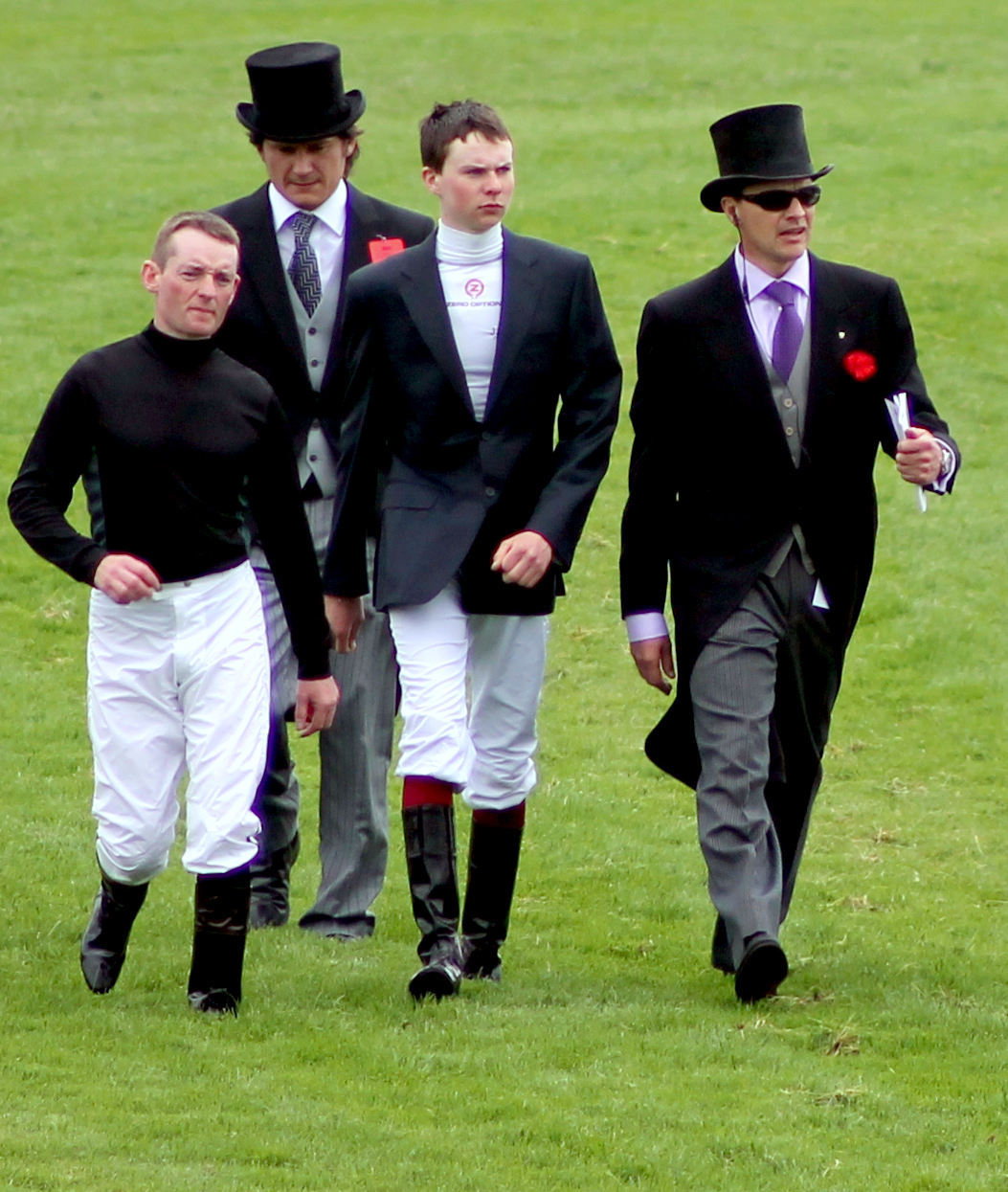
Aidan (right) and Joseph O'Brien (centre) walk the course before the 2012 Derby with Seamie Heffernan (left)

On 2 June, Camelot started the 8/13 favourite for the Epsom Derby in front of a crowd of 130,000, which included Queen Elizabeth II, who was beginning the celebrations for her Diamond Jubilee. His main rival was expected to be Bonfire, his former paddock companion at Highclere, who had won the Dante Stakes. Other contenders in the field of nine (the smallest since 1907) included Main Sequence, the winner of the Lingfield Derby Trial, and Camelot's stable companion Astrology, who had won the Dee Stakes by eleven lengths. Ridden by Joseph O'Brien, Camelot was restrained at the back of the field as Astrology made the running. Camelot moved up to challenge for the lead in the straight and pulled clear to win by five lengths from Main Sequence in second and Astrology in third. The victory made O'Brien and Joseph, 19, the first father-son/trainer-jockey pairing to win the race. After the race, Joseph O'Brien explained that the horse had struggled to cope with the descent to the turn into the straight, saying that Camelot "had only run three times before and never on a track like this, so he was looking where to put his feet round Tattenham Corner". The win gave Aidan O'Brien his fourth British Classic win of the season and led to speculation that Camelot could become the first horse since Nijinsky in 1970 to win the Triple Crown. Since Nijinsky, only two horses have won the 2000 Guineas and the Derby: Nashwan in 1989 and Sea the Stars in 2009, neither of whom contested the St Leger. O'Brien said that "every trip he's raced over, he's coped... there are a lot of options and the St Leger is one."

On 30 June, Camelot ran in Ireland for only the second time when he contested the Irish Derby at the Curragh. He started the 1/5 favourite against four opponents in a race run on extremely soft ground. Joseph O'Brien settled Camelot in fourth place as Astrology made the running. Astrology weakened half a mile from the finish, and Akeed Mofeed went to the front ahead of Light Heavy. O'Brien moved Camelot up to lead on the outside two furlongs from the finish and held off the late challenge of Born to Sea to win by two lengths despite hanging to the left in the closing stages. It was the trainer's seventh consecutive Irish Derby win and tenth in all, and made Camelot the sixteenth horse to complete the Epsom and Irish Derby double. After the race, Aidan O'Brien said that he had been very worried by the state of the ground before praising the colt's determination and indicating that he would be rested to prepare for an autumn campaign. He described the Triple Crown as "something incredible to dream about".

==== Autumn ====
After the Irish Derby, Camelot was rested until the St Leger at Doncaster Racecourse on 15 September, making him the first horse to attempt to win the Triple Crown since Nijinsky in 1970. He started a 2/5 favourite for the classic, which attracted a crowd of 32,000 to the Yorkshire track. In the race, he was settled towards the rear of the field before moving up on the inside challenge in the straight, where he was briefly unable to obtain a clear run. Camelot made up ground throughout the final quarter-mile but was unable to run down Encke, who had gained a decisive break on the field, and finished second by three-quarters of a length. (In May 2013 Encke tested positive for a banned steroid and there were calls for his disqualification from the 2012 St Leger, which would have made Camelot a Triple Crown winner.) There was some criticism of Joseph O'Brien's riding, but Aidan O'Brien blamed himself for failing to run a pacemaker.

Three weeks after his defeat at Doncaster, Camelot raced against older horses for the first time in the Prix de l'Arc de Triomphe at Longchamp. The colt was set to carry a weight of 123 pounds, too low for Joseph O'Brien, so the ride on Camelot was given to Frankie Dettori, a jockey usually associated with Coolmore's rival Godolphin. Camelot started second favourite at odds of 3.75/1 but although he made some progress in the straight he never challenged the leaders and finished seventh of the eighteen runners behind Solemia. After the race, O'Brien explained that the effects of a long season and the extremely soft ground had contributed to Camelot's run and announced that the colt would stay in training in 2013.

On 11 October, Camelot became ill with colic and was admitted to the Fethard Veterinary Hospital, where he underwent surgery.

In November, Camelot was a clear-cut winner of the vote for the title of European Champion three-year-old colt at the Cartier Racing Awards. In December, he was named Irish Horse of the Year in a poll conducted by Horse Racing Ireland.

=== 2013: four-year-old season ===
Camelot began his third season at the Curragh on 6 May, when he contested the Group 2 Mooresbridge Stakes over ten furlongs. He started the 1/3 favourite and won "comfortably" by one and three quarter lengths from his stable companion Triumphant. On 26 May, Camelot started favourite for the Tattersalls Gold Cup, but was beaten by the British five-year-old Al Kazeem. On 20 June, the colt started the 5/2 favourite for the Prince of Wales's Stakes at Royal Ascot, but was beaten four lengths, into fourth by Al Kazeem. Camelot remained in training until the autumn but missed intended runs in the Eclipse Stakes, Juddmonte International, Irish Champion Stakes and Prix de l'Arc de Triomphe.

=== Retirement ===
On 14 October 2013, Coolmore announced that Camelot was retiring and would start a breeding career in 2014. O'Brien said that he felt that the horse had never fully recovered after his attack of colic. Paying tribute to the horse O'Brien said "He was the perfect racehorse, a beautiful horse with a terrific action. Speed, class and a super-intelligent horse to go with it – he had it all".

== Stud career ==
Camelot stands as a stallion at Coolmore Stud. His fee for the year 2021 stands at €60,000 per service.

=== Notable progeny ===
c = colt, f = filly, g = gelding

Foaled	Name	Sex	Major wins
2015	Athena	f	Belmont Oaks
2015	Latrobe	c	Irish Derby
2016	Wonderment	f	Critérium de Saint-Cloud
2016	Sir Dragonet	c	W. S. Cox Plate, Tancred Stakes
2016	Final Orders	g	Velká pardubická
2017	Russian Camelot	c	South Australian Derby, Underwood Stakes
2017	Even So	f	Irish Oaks
2017	Sunny Queen	f	Grosser Preis von Bayern
2018	Santa Barbara	f	Belmont Oaks, Beverly D. Stakes
2019	Luxembourg	c	Vertem Futurity Trophy, Irish Champion Stakes, Tattersalls Gold Cup, Coronation Cup
2019	Sammarco	c	Deutsches Derby, Bayerisches Zuchtrennen
2020	Bluestocking	f	Pretty Polly Stakes, Prix Vermeille, Prix de l'Arc de Triomphe
2021	Los Angeles	c	Criterium de Saint-Cloud, Irish Derby, Tattersalls Gold Cup
2023	Pierre Bonnard	c	Criterium de Saint-Cloud
2023	Christmas Day	c	Epsom Derby
2024	Darkness Falls	c	Golden Fleece Stakes, Dewhurst Stakes

== Pedigree ==
Pedigree of Camelot (GB), bay colt, 2009
Sire Montjeu (IRE) 1996	Sadler's Wells; 1981	Northern Dancer	Nearctic
Sire Montjeu (IRE) 1996	Sadler's Wells; 1981	Northern Dancer	Natalma
Sire Montjeu (IRE) 1996	Sadler's Wells; 1981	Fairy Bridge	Bold Reason
Sire Montjeu (IRE) 1996	Sadler's Wells; 1981	Fairy Bridge	Special
Sire Montjeu (IRE) 1996	Floripedes; 1985	Top Ville	High Top
Sire Montjeu (IRE) 1996	Floripedes; 1985	Top Ville	Sega Ville
Sire Montjeu (IRE) 1996	Floripedes; 1985	Toute Cy	Tennyson
Sire Montjeu (IRE) 1996	Floripedes; 1985	Toute Cy	Adele Toumignon
Dam Tarfah (USA) 2001	Kingmambo; 1990	Mr. Prospector	Raise a Native
Dam Tarfah (USA) 2001	Kingmambo; 1990	Mr. Prospector	Gold Digger
Dam Tarfah (USA) 2001	Kingmambo; 1990	Miesque	Nureyev
Dam Tarfah (USA) 2001	Kingmambo; 1990	Miesque	Pasadoble
Dam Tarfah (USA) 2001	Fickle; 1996	Danehill	Danzig
Dam Tarfah (USA) 2001	Fickle; 1996	Danehill	Razyana
Dam Tarfah (USA) 2001	Fickle; 1996	Fade	Persepolis
Dam Tarfah (USA) 2001	Fickle; 1996	Fade	One Over Parr (Family: 4-o)
