= Ted Durcan =

Irish jockey

Personal information
- Born: 25 February 1973 (age 53) County Mayo
- Occupation: Jockey

Horse racing career
- Sport: Horse racing

Major racing wins
- Major races Haydock Sprint Cup (2003); Epsom Oaks (2007); St Leger (2009); Sun Chariot Stakes (2009)

Significant horses
- Light Shift, Mastery, Sahpresa, Somnus

Thomas Edward Durcan (born 25 February 1973) is a retired, two-time British Classic-winning Irish jockey. He was champion jockey in the United Arab Emirates on seven occasions and rode over 1,000 winners in Great Britain in career lasting from 1992 to 2017.

== Career ==
Durcan was born in County Mayo, Ireland, and went to boarding school in Naas. The school held him back from a riding career for sometime, as it prevented him riding out for stables. Naas had its own racecourse, and several others within easy reach, so although it was against rules for boys to visit the course, his headmaster tolerated it. After leaving, Durcan joined trainer Jim Bolger as apprentice at the same time as Tony McCoy

His first Group 1 victory came in the 2003 Haydock Sprint Cup on Somnus. In the middle of the decade, his biggest victories came in continental Europe. In France, he won the Group 1 Prix Morny on Silca's Sister for Mick Channon, while in Italy he won the 2005 Premio Lydia Tesio on Dubai Surprise and 2006 Premio Roma on Cherry Mix. Both were trained by Saeed bin Suroor.

He won the 2007 Oaks for Henry Cecil on Light Shift, and 2009 proved his best season domestically for Group 1 wins, winning the St Leger on Mastery and the Sun Chariot Stakes on Sahpresa. This run of success meant that each year between 2007 and 2009 he won over £1 million in prize money, and 2007 proved his most prolific winning year in Britain, when he won 95.

Although only a Group 3 race, the biggest prize money pot of his career was the Dubai Duty Free he won in March 2000 on Rhythm Band for bin Suroor.

In later years, the number of wins were fewer, with between 40 and 60 wins per year. He finished second in the 2012 Epsom Derby, riding Main Sequence, 5 lengths behind winner Camelot. His 2017 season was curtailed by an ankle injury sustained in a fall at Leicester. The fall took place after the winning line, after finishing fifth in a five furlong novice stakes race on Plundered.

On 18 February 2018, Durcan announced his retirement from race-riding at the age of 44.

== Statistics by year ==
Year	Wins	Runs	Strike rate	Total earnings
1997	15	199	8	£91,993
1999	0	3	0	—
2000	23	236	10	£176,338
2001	54	490	11	£448,827
2002	58	545	11	£804,087
2003	29	374	8	£548,178
2004	40	589	7	£734,528
2005	60	707	8	£968,788
2006	71	732	10	£928,667
2007	95	793	12	£1,364,525
2008	75	665	11	£1,372,653
2009	94	617	15	£1,329,458
2010	88	567	16	£741,534
2011	58	465	12	£590,240
2012	56	503	11	£710,865
2013	46	432	11	£324,391
2014	50	353	14	£383,833
2015	51	382	13	£602,194
2016	45	354	13	£560,046
2017	13	161	8	£153,645

== Major wins ==
(United Kingdom) Great Britain

- Haydock Sprint Cup - Somnus (2003)
- Epsom Oaks - Light Shift (2007)
- St Leger - Mastery (2009)
- Sun Chariot Stakes - Sahpresa (2009)

France

- Prix Morny - Silca's Sister (2005)

Italy

- Premio Lydia Tesio - Dubai Surprise (2005)
- Premio Roma - Cherry Mix (2006)
