= Lucarno =

American-bred Thoroughbred racehorse

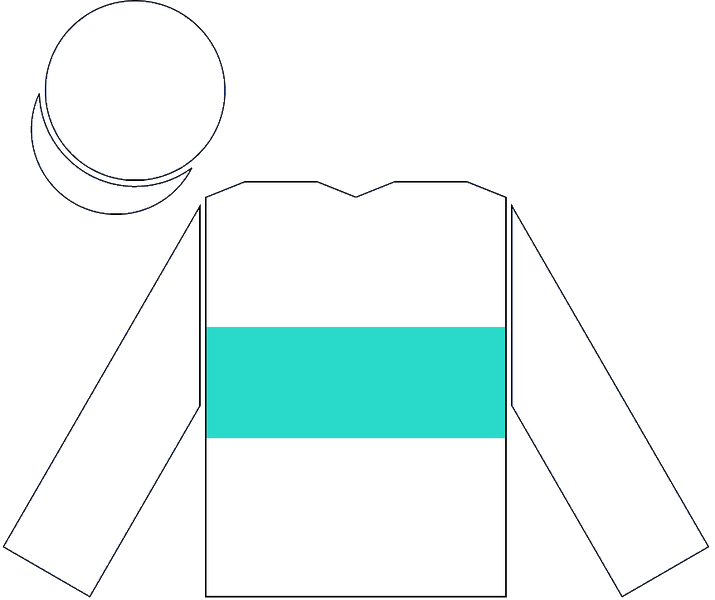
- Racing silks of George Strawbridge
- Sire: Dynaformer
- Grandsire: Roberto
- Dam: Vignette
- Damsire: Diesis
- Sex: Stallion
- Foaled: February 10, 2004
- Died: March 20, 2018
- Country: United States
- Colour: Bay
- Breeder: Augustin Stable
- Owner: George W. Strawbridge, Jr.
- Trainer: John Gosden
- Record: 11: 5-2-0
- Earnings: £573,674

Major wins
- Fairway Stakes (2007); Great Voltigeur Stakes (2007); St. Leger Stakes (2007); Princess of Wales's Stakes (2008)

Awards
- Timeform rating 121 (2007, 2008)

Lucarno (February 10, 2004 - March 20, 2018) was a Thoroughbred racehorse and sire best known for winning the St Leger in 2007.

== Background ==
Lucarno is a big, powerful bay horse, standing 16.3 hands high, bred in Pennsylvania by his owner George W. Strawbridge, Jr. He was sired by Dynaformer whose other offspring includes Barbaro and McDynamo.

The colt was sent to race in Europe where he was trained by John Gosden. He was ridden in most of his races by Jimmy Fortune.

== Racing career ==
=== 2007: three-year-old season ===
Unraced as a two-year-old, Lucarno made his racecourse debut in a maiden race at Newbury Racecourse in April in which he started a 50/1 outsider and finished second of the sixteen runners behind Diamond Tycoon. He then made rapid progress, winning a maiden over a mile at Kempton Park by seven lengths and the Listed Fairway Stakes over ten furlongs at Newmarket Racecourse in May.

In June, Lucarno started a 16/1 outsider for The Derby and finished fourth of the seventeen runners behind Authorized, Eagle Mountain and Aqaleem. Later that month he started favourite for the King Edward VII Stakes at Royal Ascot but was beaten into second place by the Mark Johnston-trained Boscobel. In July, the colt was matched against older horses for the first time in the Princess of Wales's Stakes and finished fourth behind the four-year-old Papal Bull. In August Lucarno contested the Great Voltigeur Stakes at York Racecourse and started 7/2 second favourite in a field which included Boscobel and four runner from Aidan O'Brien's Ballydoyle stable, headed by the Gordon Stakes winner Yellowstone and the Queen's Vase winner Mahler. Lucarno raced on the outside, but was among the leaders throughout the race before taking the lead approaching the final furlong and winning by a lengths from Yellowstone.

At Doncaster Racecourse on 15 September 2007, Lucarno started 7/2 second favourite for the 231st running of the St Leger Stakes. The Ballydoyle stable again fielded four runners including Mahler and the favourite Honolulu, a colt who had finished second under a weight of 128 pounds in the Ebor Handicap. Lucarno raced just behind the leaders before making progress in the straight. He took the lead a furlong out and stayed on to win by a length from Mahler, with Honolulu three quarters of a length away in third place.

=== 2008: four-year-old season ===
Lucarno began his four-year-old season in disappointing form, finishing eleventh in the Brigadier Gerard Stakes at Sandown Park in May and sixth of nine behind Youmzain in the Grand Prix de Saint-Cloud a month later. On 10 July he started at odds of 6/1 for the Princess of Wales's Stakes at Newmarket. Papal Bull, the winner of the race in 2007 started favourite ahead of the Lancashire Oaks winner Anna Pavlova and the Prix de l'Arc de Triomphe third Sagara. Fortune sent Lucarno into the lead from the start and he was never seriously challenged, winning by one and a quarter lengths from Papal Bull (to whom he was conceding five pounds) with the outsider Petara Bay in third. Sixteen days later, Lucarno contested Britain's most prestigious weight-for-age race, the King George VI and Queen Elizabeth Stakes at Ascot. Starting the 8/1 third favourite he raced in second place until the last quarter mile but faded in the closing stages to finish seventh of the eight runners behind Duke of Marmalade, who won by a length from Papal Bull. Lucarno failed to recover his best form in Autumn: he was beaten more than nineteen lengths when finishing fifth in the Grosser Preis von Baden and eighth of ten behind Marsh Side in the Canadian International.

== Stud career ==
Retired to stud for the 2009 season, Lucarno stood at Wood Farm Stud in Ellerdine, Wellington, Shropshire, before moving to the Shade Oak Stud in the same county. He has been primarily marketed as a National Hunt stallion.

He died of a heart attack at Longford House Stud in County Tipperary on March 20, 2018

== Pedigree ==
Pedigree of Lucarno, bay stallion, 2004
Sire Dynaformer (USA) 1985	Roberto (USA); 1969	Hail To Reason	Turn-To
Sire Dynaformer (USA) 1985	Roberto (USA); 1969	Hail To Reason	Nothirdchance
Sire Dynaformer (USA) 1985	Roberto (USA); 1969	Bramalea	Nashua
Sire Dynaformer (USA) 1985	Roberto (USA); 1969	Bramalea	Rarelea
Sire Dynaformer (USA) 1985	Andover Way (USA); 1978	His Majesty	Ribot
Sire Dynaformer (USA) 1985	Andover Way (USA); 1978	His Majesty	Flower Bowl
Sire Dynaformer (USA) 1985	Andover Way (USA); 1978	On The Trail	Olympia
Sire Dynaformer (USA) 1985	Andover Way (USA); 1978	On The Trail	Golden Trail
Dam Vignette (USA) 1995	Diesis (GB); 1980	Sharpen Up	Atan
Dam Vignette (USA) 1995	Diesis (GB); 1980	Sharpen Up	Rocchetta
Dam Vignette (USA) 1995	Diesis (GB); 1980	Doubly Sure	Reliance
Dam Vignette (USA) 1995	Diesis (GB); 1980	Doubly Sure	Soft Angels
Dam Vignette (USA) 1995	Be Exclusive (IRE); 1986	Be My Guest	Northern Dancer
Dam Vignette (USA) 1995	Be Exclusive (IRE); 1986	Be My Guest	What A Treat
Dam Vignette (USA) 1995	Be Exclusive (IRE); 1986	Exclusive Fable	Exclusive Native
Dam Vignette (USA) 1995	Be Exclusive (IRE); 1986	Exclusive Fable	Ancient Fables (Family:9-f)
