= Jimmy Fortune (jockey) =

Irish jockey (born 1972)

Personal information
- Born: 14 June 1972 (age 54) County Wexford; Ireland
- Occupation: Jockey

Horse racing career
- Sport: Horse racing
- Career wins: Great Britain: 1,780

Major racing wins
- Major races British Classic wins St Leger Stakes (2007); Other major British races Cheveley Park Stakes (2008); Coronation Stakes (2006); Fillies' Mile (2004, 2005, 2008); Lockinge Stakes (2009); Middle Park Stakes (2002); Queen Elizabeth II Stakes (2008); Racing Post Trophy (1998); Yorkshire Oaks (2009) International races Prix de la Forêt (2001); Matron Stakes (2009); Pretty Polly Stakes (2009); Premio Vittorio di Capua (2007); Indian Derby (1996, 2013)

Significant horses
- Dar Re Mi, Lucarno, Oasis Dream

James Joseph Fortune (born 14 June 1972) is a retired Irish thoroughbred jockey who in a 30-year career won over 1,800 races, including 16 Group 1s, and 1 British Classic, the 2007 St Leger.

== Career ==
Fortune was apprenticed to Mike O'Neill and Luca Cumani. He was first licensed in 1987 and his first win came on 29 July 1988 at Thirsk riding Hitchenstown for Eric Alston. It was O'Neill who brought Fortune over to Britain, and his first major victory was on O'Neill's Joveworth at 50/1 in the 1989 Ayr Gold Cup, while still an apprentice, claiming 5lb. In 1990 he became Champion Apprentice with 47 wins.

Later, Fortune became jockey for David Barron, then took a retainer with Jack Ramsden after Kieren Fallon left. This led to him becoming the retained jockey for Robert Sangster in 1998, when Peter Chapple-Hyam was his trainer. His first Group 1 win was on Commander Collins in that season's Racing Post Trophy. Following that, he rode for Paul Cole.

For seven years he was associated with John Gosden. For Gosden, he won his only Classic win on Lucarno in the 2007 St Leger. Other victories for Gosden included the Fillies' Mile and Coronation Stakes on Nannina, the Queen Elizabeth II Stakes on Raven's Pass, the Middle Park Stakes on Oasis Dream and the Pretty Polly Stakes, Yorkshire Oaks and Prix Vermeille (although later controversially disqualified) on Dar Re Mi. He also won the Hungerford Stakes and Challenge Stakes on Sleeping Indian, who as a favourite horse.

He rode Expresso Star to win the 2009 Lincoln Handicap, taking home the £125,000 first prize.

He turned freelance in 2010. Later in his career, he rode for Brian Meehan and Andrew Balding, winning the 2016 Cambridgeshire Handicap for Meehan on Spark Plug and the Diomed Stakes for Balding on Tullius.

He retired in 2017, aged 45, with back problems resulting from a fall at Newbury. In his final race, he finished third on John Gosden's Nathra in the Sun Chariot Stakes at Newmarket. "I am sad to be leaving the weighing room," he said on retirement. "You want to go on forever but I had to be realistic. It was not an easy decision to make." He planned to start a property business with his two teenage sons.

At the time of his retirement he had won 1,780 races in Britain, the seventh highest total of jockeys currently riding. His highest position in the jockeys' table was joint 4th in 1998 with 108 wins, but his best total was 110 wins in 2007. Tony Hind was his agent for 25 years. He was well-known and respected for his physical strength in the saddle.

The best week of his career was in 2006, when he was the top jockey at Royal Ascot, winning the Coronation Stakes on Nannina, the Norfolk Stakes on Winker Watson, the Royal Hunt Cup on Royal Oath, the Jersey Stakes on Tariq, the Wokingham Handicap on Baltic King and the Ascot Stakes on Full House. His best single day was also at Ascot, when he won the 2008 Fillies' Mile on Rainbow View and the Queen Elizabeth II Stakes on Raven's Pass. Raven's Pass was the highest rated horse of his career (rated 131 by the Racing Post for that win).

== Major wins ==
France

- Prix de la Forêt - (1) - Mount Abu (2001)

(United Kingdom) Great Britain

- Cheveley Park Stakes - (1) - Serious Attitude (2008)
- Coronation Stakes – (1) – Nannina (2006)
- Fillies' Mile – (3) – Playful Act (2004), Nannina (2005), Rainbow View (2008)
- Lockinge Stakes - (1) - Virtual (2009)
- Middle Park Stakes – (1) – Oasis Dream (2002)
- Queen Elizabeth II Stakes - (1) - Raven's Pass (2008)
- Racing Post Trophy – (1) – Commander Collins (1998)
- St Leger Stakes - (1) - Lucarno (2007)
- Yorkshire Oaks - (1) - Dar Re Mi (2009)

(Republic of Ireland) Ireland

- Matron Stakes – (1) – Rainbow View (2009)
- Pretty Polly Stakes - (1) - Dar Re Mi (2009)

Italy

- Premio Vittorio di Capua - (1) - Linngari (2007)

India

- Indian Derby - (2) - Star Supreme (1996) SuperStorm (2013)
