= Light Shift =

American-bred Thoroughbred racehorse

- Racing silks of Niarchos Family
- Sire: Kingmambo
- Grandsire: Mr. Prospector
- Dam: Lingerie
- Damsire: Shirley Heights
- Sex: Mare
- Foaled: 22 March 2004
- Country: United States
- Colour: Bay
- Breeder: Flaxman Holdings
- Owner: Niarchos family
- Trainer: Henry Cecil
- Record: 9: 2-2-3
- Earnings: £347,108

Major wins
- Cheshire Oaks (2007); Epsom Oaks (2007)

Light Shift (22 March 2004 – 28 March 2014) was an American-bred, British-bred Thoroughbred racehorse and broodmare best known for winning the 2007 Epsom Oaks. In a racing career which lasted from June 2006 to October 2007 the filly ran nine times and won four races. After winning once as a two-year-old, Light Shift won the Cheshire Oaks on her second appearance as a three-year-old. She then won the Classic Oaks over one and a half miles at Epsom, beating the Irish filly Peeping Fawn. Light Shift never won another race, being beaten by Peeping Fawn in the Irish Oaks and the Nassau Stakes and finishing unplaced in the Prix de l'Opéra.

== Background ==
Light Shift was a bay mare with a white star bred in Kentucky by Flaxman Holdings a breeding company run by the Niarchos family. Light Shift's sire, Kingmambo was a highly successful breeding stallion. His progeny included the British Classic winners Russian Rhythm, King's Best, Henrythenavigator Virginia Waters and Rule of Law as well as major winners in Japan (El Condor Pasa), France (Divine Proportions) and the United States (Lemon Drop Kid). Her dam, Lingerie, failed to win a race but was a daughter of Northern Trick, a mare who won the Prix Vermeille and finished second in the Prix de l'Arc de Triomphe. Before Light Shift, Lingerie had produced the Prix Jean de Chaudenay winner Limnos and Shiva, a mare who won four races including the Group One Tattersalls Gold Cup.

The filly was trained throughout her career by Henry Cecil at his Warren Place stables in Newmarket, Suffolk and was ridden in all of her races by Ted Durcan.

== Racing career ==
=== 2006: two-year-old season ===
Light Shift began her career in a six furlong maiden race at Newmarket in June in which she finished second, half a length behind the winner Wid. She then finished third to Princess Taise in a seven furlong maiden at the same course a month later. In September she was moved up in distance to one mile and recorded her first win in yet another Newmarket maiden. Starting the 15/8 favourite, she took the lead inside the final furlong and won by half a length from Sunlight. She ended the season being rated 83 by the Racing Post, suggesting that she was at least thirty pounds below top class.

=== 2007: three-year-old season ===
On her first appearance as a three-year-old, Light Shift ran in a ten furlong race for colts and fillies at Newbury. She produced a strong run in the straight and took the lead in the final furlong before winning by one and a quarter lengths from Kid Mambo. She was then moved up in class and distance for the Listed over eleven furlongs at Chester. Starting the 11/8 favourite, she accelerated to lead in the closing stages and won comfortably by three-quarters of a length from the Aidan O'Brien-trained All My Loving.

In the Oaks at Epsom on 1 June, Light Shift started at odds of 13/2 in a field of fourteen fillies, making her the fourth choice in the betting behind her stable companion Passage of Time and the Irish runners All My Loving and Four Sins. Durcan restrained the filly in the early stages before moving up to challenge to leaders in the straight. Light Shift took the lead a quarter of a mile from the finish and opened up a clear lead before holding off the strong late challenge of the Aidan O'Brien-trained outsider Peeping Fawn to win by half a length. All My Loving was four lengths further back in third. The win gave Henry Cecil his eighth win in the race and his first Classic success for seven years.

In the Irish Oaks on 15 July, Light Shift was again matched against Peeping Fawn, who had won the Group One Pretty Polly Stakes in the interim. Light Shift, the 9/4 favourite despite her trainers concerns about the soft ground, raced just behind the leaders before taking the lead in the straight, but was soon overtaken by Peeping Fawn and finished second, beaten three and a half lengths. Three weeks later, Light Shift and Peeping Fawn met for a third time in the Nassau Stakes over ten furlongs at Goodwood. On this occasion, Light Shift made some progress in the straight, but could never reach the lead and finished third, five lengths behind the Irish filly and three and a half lengths behind the runner-up Mandesha. Following the race, Cecil suggested that the filly would be aimed at the Breeders' Cup. After a break of two months, Light Shift reappeared in the Prix de l'Opéra at Longchamp. She started the 11/4 favourite but finished sixth of the eleven runners behind Satwa Queen. Cecil said that the filly's "flat" performance may have been the result of a long and demanding season.

== Assessment and honours ==
In the 2007 World Thoroughbred Racehorse Rankings, Light Shift was given a rating of 117, making her the equal seventh best three-year-old filly in the world six pounds below Rags to Riches.

== Stud record ==
Light Shift was retired to become a broodmare for the Niarchos family. Her first foal, a colt sired by Dansili, was born on 4 February 2009. She was subsequently covered by Galileo.

2009 DR YES (FR) : Bay colt, foaled 4 February, by Dansili (GB) – won two races and placed twice from 6 starts in England 2012

2012 Mosuo Bay filly, foaled 12 March, by Oasis Dream (GB)

2013 Ulysses (IRE) : Chesnut colt, foaled 20 March, by Galileo (IRE) – won five races including G1 Eclipse Stakes at Sandown; G1 International Stakes at York; G3 Gordon Stakes at Goodwood; G3 Gordon Richards Stakes at Sandown and placed three times, including 2nd G3 Winter Hill Stakes at Windsor; 4th US-G1 Breeders' Cup Turf at Santa Anita from 11 starts to date (8/24/17).

Light Shift died when giving birth to her fourth foal on 28 March 2014.

== Pedigree ==
Pedigree of Light Shift (USA), bay mare, 2004
Sire Kingmambo (USA) 1990	Mr. Prospector; 1970	Raise a Native	Native Dancer
Sire Kingmambo (USA) 1990	Mr. Prospector; 1970	Raise a Native	Raise You
Sire Kingmambo (USA) 1990	Mr. Prospector; 1970	Gold Digger	Nashua
Sire Kingmambo (USA) 1990	Mr. Prospector; 1970	Gold Digger	Sequence
Sire Kingmambo (USA) 1990	Miesque; 1984	Nureyev	Northern Dancer
Sire Kingmambo (USA) 1990	Miesque; 1984	Nureyev	Special
Sire Kingmambo (USA) 1990	Miesque; 1984	Pasadoble	Prove Out
Sire Kingmambo (USA) 1990	Miesque; 1984	Pasadoble	Santa Quilla
Dam Lingerie (GB) 1988	Shirley Heights; 1975	Mill Reef	Never Bend
Dam Lingerie (GB) 1988	Shirley Heights; 1975	Mill Reef	Milan Mill
Dam Lingerie (GB) 1988	Shirley Heights; 1975	Hardiemma	Hardicanute
Dam Lingerie (GB) 1988	Shirley Heights; 1975	Hardiemma	Grand Cross
Dam Lingerie (GB) 1988	Northern Trick; 1981	Northern Dancer	Nearctic
Dam Lingerie (GB) 1988	Northern Trick; 1981	Northern Dancer	Natalma
Dam Lingerie (GB) 1988	Northern Trick; 1981	Trick Chick	Prince John
Dam Lingerie (GB) 1988	Northern Trick; 1981	Trick Chick	Fast Line (Family: 4-m)

- Light Shift was inbred 3 × 4 to Northern Dancer, meaning that this stallion appears in both the third and the fourth generations of her pedigree.
