= Main Sequence (horse) =

American-bred Thoroughbred racehorse

- Racing silks of Niarchos Family and Flaxman Holdings
- Sire: Aldebaran
- Grandsire: Mr. Prospector
- Dam: Ikat
- Damsire: Pivotal
- Sex: Gelding
- Foaled: 13 February 2009
- Country: United States
- Colour: Chestnut
- Breeder: Flaxman Holdings
- Owner: Flaxman Holdings
- Trainer: David Lanigan; Graham Motion
- Record: 20:9-3-3
- Earnings: $3,428,666

Major wins
- Lingfield Derby Trial (2012); United Nations Stakes (2014); Sword Dancer Invitational Handicap (2014); Joe Hirsch Turf Classic (2014); Breeders' Cup Turf (2014); Mac Diarmida Handicap (2015)

Awards
- American Champion Older Male Horse (2014); American Champion Male Turf Horse (2014)

Main Sequence (foaled 13 February 2009) is a Kentucky-bred Thoroughbred racehorse. In his first three seasons he raced in Europe winning his first four races including the Lingfield Derby Trial before losing his unbeaten record when finishing second in the 2012 Epsom Derby. After failing to win in 2013 he was gelded and sent to race in the United States. In 2014 he recorded Grade I victories in his first four American starts, winning the United Nations Stakes, Sword Dancer Invitational Handicap, Joe Hirsch Turf Classic Invitational Stakes and Breeders' Cup Turf. He extended his winning run in his first start of 2015 but was retired from racing after suffering a serious tendon injury in his third race of the season.

== Background ==
Main Sequence is a chestnut horse with a narrow white blaze bred in Kentucky by Flaxman Holdings an organisation which deals with the breeding and racing interests of the Niarchos family. His sire Aldebaran, a son of Mr. Prospector, began his racing career in Britain before moving to the United States where he won three Grade I races including the 2003 Metropolitan Handicap. Main Sequence is the first foal of his dam Ikat, who won one race and finished second in the Group Three Prix d'Aumale. Ikat's dam, Burning Sunset was a half-sister to The Oaks winner Light Shift and a granddaughter of the leading French-trained racemare Northern Trick. The colt was sent to race in Europe where he was trained by David Lanigan at Upper Lambourn in Berkshire.

== Racing career ==
=== 2011: two-year-old season ===
Main Sequence began his racing career as a 50/1 outsider in a one-mile maiden race at Yarmouth Racecourse on 15 September. Ridden by George Baker he started slowly and showed his inexperience in the early stages but finished strongly to take the lead fifty yards from the finish to win by one and a quarter lengths from the favourite Almuftarris. In all his remaining European races, the horse was ridden by Ted Durcan. A month later, the colt started 7/2 favourite under a weight of 132 pounds for a Nursery over nine furlongs at Newmarket Racecourse. After being restrained towards the rear of the field he took the lead a furlong from the finish and drew away to win by three and a quarter lengths despite swishing his tail in the closing stages.

=== 2012: three-year-old season ===
Main Sequence began his second season in a handicap over ten furlongs at Newmarket on 17 April in which he carried 132 pounds and started the 2/1 favourite against seven opponents. He took the lead inside the final furlong and won by half a length from the filly Ahzeemah (later to win the Lonsdale Cup) although he again showed signs of temperament as he "flashed" his tail under pressure. The colt was then moved up in class and distance to contest the Group Three Derby Trial over one and a half miles on the Polytrack surface at Lingfield Park. He was restrained towards the rear of the field and had to be switched to the outside in the straight to obtain a clear run. Flashing his tail as usual, he took the lead in the final furlong and won by three-quarters of a length from the favourite Shantaram, with a gap of six lengths back to Cavaleiro in third. After the race Lanigan indicated that the horse would be aimed at either the Epsom Derby or the Prix du Jockey Club whilst Durcan said that the winner would "stay a mile and a half standing on his head" and was "a lovely horse in the making."

On 2 June, Main Sequence started the 9/1 fourth choice in the betting for the 233rd running of The Derby. He was restrained towards the rear of the nine runner field before making progress in the straight. He never threatened the winner Camelot, who won by five lengths, but finished strongly to take second place by a short head from Astrology. The colt was then sent overseas for the first time for the Grand Prix de Paris. In a rough race he struggled to obtain a clear run in the closing stages and appeared an unlucky loser, finishing fourth, a length and a half behind the winner Imperial Monarch. Main Sequence started favourite for the Great Voltigeur Stakes at York Racecourse on 22 August, but failed to quicken in the straight and was beaten a neck by Thought Worthy, with Encke in third and Noble Mission in fourth place. On his final appearance of the season, the colt started joint second favourite for the St Leger at Doncaster Racecourse, but although making progress in the straight he finished fifth of the nine runners behind Encke and Camelot.

=== 2013: four-year-old season ===
Main Sequence failed to win in six races in 2013. In May he was beaten ten and half lengths into third place by Ektihaam when favourite for the Buckhounds Stakes at Ascot and then finished second to Mukhadram in the Brigadier Gerard Stakes at Sandown Park Racecourse. In the latter race he again flashed his tail under pressure and was described by the Racing Post as never looking "wholehearted". He was dropped in class in June for a race at Pontefract and started favourite, but finished fourth to Brown Panther, beaten thirteen lengths by the winner. Lanigan described the performance as "too bad to be true" and it was later revealed that the horse had "scoped dirty" indicating a respiratory infection. In September Main Sequence returned to finish third in both the September Stakes at Kempton and the Arc Trial at Newbury. He ended his season by finishing eighth of the ten runners behind Farhh, when a 66/1 outsider for the Champion Stakes.

At the end of the year, Main Sequence, by now a gelding was sent to be trained in the United States by Graham Motion.

=== 2014: five-year-old season ===
Main Sequence took time to acclimatise to his new base and did not race until July 6, when he contested the Grade I United Nations Stakes over eleven furlongs on turf at Monmouth Park. Ridden by Rajiv Maragh he started at odds of 8/1 in a nine-runner field headed by the Canadian colt Kaigun and the Tom Albertrani=trained Twilight Eclipse. Main Sequence made his customary slow start and was at the back of the field for most of the way before producing a run on the outside in the straight. Flashing his tail as usual he overtook Twilight Eclipse in the final strides to win by a neck, recording his first win at the highest level and his first win of any kind for more than two years. After the race Motion said He got quite sick over the winter, so we really waited until he was ready to run. Ravij did a great job with him. We did not want him to get to the front too early and he has a tremendous turn of foot." At Saratoga Race Course in August, Main Sequence was matched against the Man o' War Stakes winner Imagining and the Louisville Handicap winner War Dancer in the Sword Dancer Invitational Handicap over one and a half miles. Maragh held up the slow-starting gelding and was still in sixth place approaching the final furlong. In the closing stages, the gelding produced a sustained run to catch Imagining in the final stride and won by a head in a time of 2:24.72 with Twilight Eclipse in third. Motion admitted that he thought that the horse had been beaten, saying "I really didn't think he got there, so when I saw the rerun, I thought it was unbelievable" while Maragh commented "Coming off the turn, he was like, 'Let's go,' so we went. He was full of run. I know we were catching two good horses, and they weren't going to go down too easily. But he was full of run, and it seemed like we might have just gotten there right on time."

On September 27, Main Sequence attempted to gain his third consecutive Grade I victory in the Joe Hirsch Turf Classic at Belmont Park. As well as Twilight Eclipse and Imagining, his opponents included Big Blue Kitten (winner of the United Nations Stakes and the Sword Dancer Invitational in 2013) and Real Solution (winner of the Arlington Million and the Manhattan Handicap). The gelding raced in fifth before moving up into third on the outside on the final turn. He took the lead inside the final furlong and held off the renewed challenge of Twilight Eclipse to win by head. The racecourse stewards held an inquiry into interference caused when Main Sequence hung to the left in the closing stages and bumped the runner-up, but allowed the result to stand. Maragh admitted that on this occasion, he may have sent the horse into the lead too early saying "When he made the lead, it was a little sooner than we wanted. He started loafing a little bit; I tried to make him see the other horse and a little contact happened. I felt like I was going to be OK on the inquiry, but it was nerve-wracking."

On November 1 Main Sequence started at odd of 6.2/1 for the thirty-first running of the Breeders' Cup Turf at Santa Anita Park. He was matched against Twilight Eclipse, Imagining and the Arlington Million winner Hardest Core as well as several major winners from Europe including Telescope, Flintshire (runner up to Treve in the Prix de l'Arc de Triomphe) and Brown Panther (Irish St. Leger). With Maragh sidelined by injury, the gelding was ridden by the Puerto Rican jockey John R. Velazquez. As usual, Main Sequence was restrained in the early stages as Imagining set a steady pace before Hardest Core took over after half a mile. Hardest Core maintained his advantage until the straight when he was overtaken by Telescope and Flintshire, but Main Sequence produced his customary late run on the outside, took the lead inside the final furlong and won by half a length from Flintshire, with Twilight Eclipse third ahead of Telescope. After the race Motion said "He did everything so well and so easily today. He broke really well and went on from there and did everything great. It really was a team effort and the horse has been spectacular. He's really suited to American racing and he just gets better and better. He's a very impressive horse. I hadn't even thought about Horse of the Year now, but I think he should be. Horses don't win four grade I races in a row like that. How many horses can do that? He has to be one of the best I've trained".

=== 2015: six-year-old season ===
On his first appearance in 2015, Main Sequence started the 3/5 favourite for the Grade II Mac Diarmida Handicap over eleven furlongs at Gulfstream Park. He won his fifth consecutive race, producing his customary late run to win by three-quarters of a length from the 2014 winner, Twilight Eclipse. In March, the gelding was sent to the United Arab Emirates to contest the Sheema Classic at Meydan Racecourse. Starting the 9/2 third favorite he recovered from a slow start and was in contention three furlongs out but faded in the straight to finish seventh of the nine runners behind the French filly Dolniya. In July he attempted to repeat his 2014 success in the United Nations Stakes He was made the 8/5 favourite but finished seventh behind Big Blue Kitten. Veterinary examinations revealed that the gelding had suffered a torn tendon and his retirement from racing was announced eight days later. Graham Motion commented "It is an injury a horse can come back from. It is a matter of rest. But the horse doesn't owe anyone anything, and the family would like to see him retire a champion. He would be capable of doing other things, but it is all to be decided."

== Pedigree ==
Pedigree of Main Sequence (GB), chestnut stallion, 2009
Sire Aldebaran (USA) 1998	Mr. Prospector (USA); 1970	Raise a Native	Native Dancer
Sire Aldebaran (USA) 1998	Mr. Prospector (USA); 1970	Raise a Native	Raise You
Sire Aldebaran (USA) 1998	Mr. Prospector (USA); 1970	Gold Digger	Nashua
Sire Aldebaran (USA) 1998	Mr. Prospector (USA); 1970	Gold Digger	Sequence
Sire Aldebaran (USA) 1998	Chimes of Freedom (USA); 1987	Private Account	Damascus
Sire Aldebaran (USA) 1998	Chimes of Freedom (USA); 1987	Private Account	Numbered Account
Sire Aldebaran (USA) 1998	Chimes of Freedom (USA); 1987	Aviance	Northfields
Sire Aldebaran (USA) 1998	Chimes of Freedom (USA); 1987	Aviance	Minnie Hauk
Dam Ikat (IRE) 2004	Pivotal (GB); 1993	Polar Falcon	Nureyev
Dam Ikat (IRE) 2004	Pivotal (GB); 1993	Polar Falcon	Marie d'Argonne
Dam Ikat (IRE) 2004	Pivotal (GB); 1993	Fearless Revival	Cozzene
Dam Ikat (IRE) 2004	Pivotal (GB); 1993	Fearless Revival	Stufida
Dam Ikat (IRE) 2004	Burning Sunset (GB); 1997	Caerleon	Nijinsky
Dam Ikat (IRE) 2004	Burning Sunset (GB); 1997	Caerleon	Foreseer
Dam Ikat (IRE) 2004	Burning Sunset (GB); 1997	Lingerie	Shirley Heights
Dam Ikat (IRE) 2004	Burning Sunset (GB); 1997	Lingerie	Northern Trick (Family: 4-m)
