= Northern Trick =

American-bred Thoroughbred racehorse

- Sire: Northern Dancer
- Grandsire: Nearctic
- Dam: Trick Chick
- Damsire: Prince John
- Sex: Mare
- Foaled: 11 April 1981
- Country: United States
- Colour: Chestnut
- Breeder: Warner Jones (Hermitage Farm, Kentucky)
- Owner: Stavros Niarchos
- Trainer: François Boutin
- Record: 6: 4-2-0
- Earnings: FF 2,910,000

Major wins
- Prix de Diane (1984); Prix de la Nonette (1984); Prix Vermeille (1984)

Awards
- Timeform rating 131; Timeform top-rated three-year-old filly (1984); European top-rated three-year-old filly (1984)

Northern Trick (foaled 1981 – c. 2002) was an American-bred, French-trained Thoroughbred racehorse and broodmare. In a racing career which lasted from April to October 1984 she won four of her six races. She established herself as the best three-year-old filly in Europe by winning the Prix de Diane and the Prix Vermeille before finishing second in the Prix de l'Arc de Triomphe. She was then retired to stud and had some success as a broodmare.

== Background ==
Northern Trick was a tall, narrow and sparely-made chestnut mare, with a white blaze and a white sock on her right hind leg, bred by Warner L. Jones at Hermitage Farm, Kentucky. She was one of numerous top-class winners sired by Northern Dancer the Canadian-bred winner of the 1964 Kentucky Derby. Northern Trick was half-sister to On The Sly, winner of 14 races including the Jockey Club Gold Cup. Through her dam Trick Chick, Northern Trick was a granddaughter of the notable broodmare Fast Line.

During her racing career she was owned by Stavros Niarchos, trained by François Boutin and regularly ridden by Cash Asmussen.

== Racing career ==
Northern Trick did not race as a two-year-old and began her racing career in April 1984, when she won a maiden race over 2000 metres at Longchamp Racecourse. In May over the same course and distance she finished second to Grise Mine in the Prix Saint-Alary, beaten half a length by the winner. In June Northern Trick contested the Prix de Diane at Chantilly Racecourse, for which Grise Mine started the odds-on favourite. Northern Trick was held up in the early stages of the race and turned into the straight in tenth place. Switched to the outside by Asmussen she overtook Grise Mine and pulled clear to win impressively by five lengths.

After a break of two months Northern Trick returned to record a comfortable victory over Ibadiyya and Treizieme in the Prix de la Nonette at Longchamp. In September she faced a strong field in the Prix Vermeille at Longchamp and won by a length from The Oaks winner Circus Plume. In October she was matched against colts and older horses in the Prix de l'Arc de Triomphe. She finished second to the four-year-old colt Sagace, six lengths clear of All Along. The unplaced horses included Strawberry Road, Time Charter, Sun Princess and Sadler's Wells.

== Assessment ==
The independent Timeform organisation gave Northern Trick a rating of 131 in 1984, making her the highest-rated filly of the season. In the official International Classification, Northern Trick was the top-rated three-year-old filly in Europe eleven pounds behind the top-rated horse El Gran Senor.

== Stud record ==
Through her daughter Lingerie, Northern Trick is the ancestor of Shiva (Tattersalls Gold Cup), Light Shift (Epsom Oaks) and Main Sequence (Joe Hirsch Turf Classic). Another daughter, Nova Cyngi, produced the leading steeplechaser Dodging Bullets.

Foals

- 1988 LINGERIE (GB) : Bay filly, foaled 28 March, by Shirley Heights (GB) – placed four times from 12 starts in France 1990–91, dam of winners including Limnos (JPN)(1994, by Hector Protector (USA) – G2 Prix Jean de Chaudenay; G3 Prix Foy), Shiva (JPN) (1995, by Hector Protector (USA) – G1 Tattersalls Gold Cup; G3 Brigadier Gerard S; G3 Earl of Sefton S) and Light Shift (USA) (2004, by Kingmambo (USA) – G1 Oaks S; LR Cheshire Oaks).

== Pedigree ==
Pedigree of Northern Trick (USA), chestnut mare, 1981
Sire Northern Dancer (CAN) 1961	Nearctic (CAN); 1954	Nearco	Pharos
Sire Northern Dancer (CAN) 1961	Nearctic (CAN); 1954	Nearco	Nogara
Sire Northern Dancer (CAN) 1961	Nearctic (CAN); 1954	Lady Angela	Hyperion
Sire Northern Dancer (CAN) 1961	Nearctic (CAN); 1954	Lady Angela	Sister Sarah
Sire Northern Dancer (CAN) 1961	Natalma (USA); 1957	Native Dancer	Polynesian
Sire Northern Dancer (CAN) 1961	Natalma (USA); 1957	Native Dancer	Geisha
Sire Northern Dancer (CAN) 1961	Natalma (USA); 1957	Almahmoud	Mahmoud
Sire Northern Dancer (CAN) 1961	Natalma (USA); 1957	Almahmoud	Arbitrator
Dam Trick Chick (USA) 1966	Prince John (USA); 1953	Princequillo	Prince Rose
Dam Trick Chick (USA) 1966	Prince John (USA); 1953	Princequillo	Cosquilla
Dam Trick Chick (USA) 1966	Prince John (USA); 1953	Not Afraid	Count Fleet
Dam Trick Chick (USA) 1966	Prince John (USA); 1953	Not Afraid	Banish Fear
Dam Trick Chick (USA) 1966	Fast Line (USA); 1958	Mr Busher	War Admiral
Dam Trick Chick (USA) 1966	Fast Line (USA); 1958	Mr Busher	Baby League
Dam Trick Chick (USA) 1966	Fast Line (USA); 1958	Throttle Wide	Flying Heels
Dam Trick Chick (USA) 1966	Fast Line (USA); 1958	Throttle Wide	Let Her Fly (Family 4-m)
