= 2013 British Champions Series =

Third annual British Champions Series for Thoroughbred racehorses

The 2013 British Champions Series was the third annual British Champions Series for Thoroughbred racehorses, comprising 35 of the country's top flat races. It was sponsored by Qatari investment company, QIPCO. As with both previous Champions Series, it was split into five divisions. The horse rankings in each division were determined by the horses' performance ratings (as assessed by the British Horseracing Authority Official Handicapper) in QIPCO British Champions Series races throughout the season. There were also rankings for jockeys and trainers based on a points system.

== Results ==
=== Sprint ===
Race	Date	Distance	Course	1st	2nd	3rd
Temple Stakes	25 May	5 furlongs	Haydock	Kingsgate Native; Shane Kelly - Robert Cowell	Swiss Spirit; William Buick - John Gosden	Reckless Abandon; Adam Kirby - Clive Cox
King's Stand Stakes	18 June	5 furlongs	Ascot	Sole Power; Johnny Murtagh - Edward Lynam	Shea Shea; Christophe Soumillon - Mike de Kock	Pearl Secret; Jamie Spencer - David Barron
Diamond Jubilee Stakes	22 June	6 furlongs	Ascot	Lethal Force; Adam Kirby - Clive Cox	Society Rock; Kieren Fallon - James Fanshawe	Krypton Factor; Luke Morris - Fawzi Abdulla Nass
July Cup	13 July	6 furlongs	Newmarket	Lethal Force; Adam Kirby - Clive Cox	Society Rock; Kieren Fallon - James Fanshawe	Slade Power; Wayne Lordan - Edward Lynam
Nunthorpe Stakes	23 August	5 furlongs	York	Jwala; Steve Drowne - Robert Cowell	Shea Shea; Frankie Dettori - Mike de Kock	Sole Power; Johnny Murtagh - Edward Lynam
Haydock Sprint Cup	7 September	6 furlongs	Haydock	Gordon Lord Byron; Johnny Murtagh - Tom Hogan	Slade Power; Wayne Lordan - Edward Lynam	Hoof It; Graham Gibbons - Mick Easterby
British Champions Sprint Stakes	19 October	6 furlongs	Ascot	Slade Power; Wayne Lordan - Edward Lynam	Jack Dexter; Graham Lee - Jim Goldie	Viztoria; Pat Smullen - Edward Lynam

=== Mile ===
Race	Date	Distance	Course	1st	2nd	3rd
2,000 Guineas	4 May	1 mile	Newmarket	Dawn Approach; Kevin Manning - Jim Bolger	Glory Awaits; Jamie Spencer - Kevin Ryan	Van Der Neer; William Buick - Richard Hannon, Sr.
Lockinge Stakes	18 May	1 mile	Newbury	Farhh; S De Sousa - Saeed bin Suroor	Sovereign Debt; Adam Kirby - Michael Bell	Aljamaaheer; Paul Hanagan - Roger Varian
Queen Anne Stakes	18 June	1 mile	Ascot	Declaration of War; Joseph O'Brien - Aidan O'Brien	Aljamaaher; Paul Hanagan - Roger Varian	Gregorian; Tom Queally - John Gosden
St. James's Palace Stakes	18 June	1 mile	Ascot	Dawn Approach; Kevin Manning - Jim Bolger	Toronado; Richard Hughes - Richard Hannon Sr.	Mars; Ryan Moore - Aidan O'Brien
Sussex Stakes	31 July	1 mile	Goodwood	Toronado; Richard Hughes - Richard Hannon Sr.	Dawn Approach; Kevin Manning - Jim Bolger	Declaration of War; Joseph O'Brien - Aidan O'Brien
Joel Stakes	27 September	1 mile	Newmarket	Soft Falling Rain; Paul Hanagan - Mike de Kock	Montiridge; Richard Hughes - Richard Hannon, Sr.	Premio Loco; George Baker - Chris Wall
Queen Elizabeth II Stakes	19 October	1 mile	Ascot	Olympic Glory; Richard Hughes - Richard Hannon, Sr.	Top Notch Tonto; Dale Swift - Brian Ellison	Kingsbarns; Joseph O'Brien - Aidan O'Brien

=== Middle Distance ===
Race	Date	Distance	Course	1st	2nd	3rd
Coronation Cup	1 June	1 mile 4 furlongs	Epsom	St Nicholas Abbey; Joseph O'Brien - Aidan O'Brien	Dunaden; Jamie Spencer - Mikel Delzangles	Joshua Tree; Ryan Moore - Ed Dunlop
Epsom Derby	1 June	1 mile 4 furlongs	Epsom	Ruler Of The World; Ryan Moore - Aidan O'Brien	Libertarian; William Buick - Mrs K Burke	Galileo Rock; Wayne Lordan - David Wachman
Prince of Wales's Stakes	19 June	1 mile 2 furlongs	Ascot	Al Kazeem; James Doyle - Roger Charlton	Mukhadram; Paul Hanagan - William Haggas	The Fugue; William Buick - John Gosden
Eclipse Stakes	6 July	1 mile 2 furlongs	Sandown	Al Kazeem; James Doyle - Roger Charlton	Declaration of War; Joseph O'Brien - Aidan O'Brien	Mukhadram; Paul Hanagan - William Haggas
King George VI & Queen Elizabeth Stakes	27 July	1 mile 4 furlongs	Ascot	Novellist; Johnny Murtagh - Andreas Wohler	Trading Leather; Kevin Manning - Jim Bolger	Hillstar; Ryan Moore - Sir Michael Stoute
Juddmonte International Stakes	21 August	1 mile 2 furlongs	York	Declaration of War; Joseph O'Brien - Aidan O'Brien	Trading Leather; Kevin Manning - Jim Bolger	Al Kazeem; James Doyle - Roger Charlton
Champion Stakes	19 October	1 mile 2 furlongs	Ascot	Farhh; Silvestre de Sousa - Saeed bin Suroor	Cirrus des Aigles; Christophe Soumillon - Corine Barande-Barbe	Ruler Of The World; Ryan Moore - Aidan O'Brien

=== Long Distance ===
Race	Date	Distance	Course	1st	2nd	3rd
Yorkshire Cup	17 May	1 mile 6 furlongs	York	Glen's Diamond; Tony Hamilton - Richard Fahey	Top Trip; Mickael Barzalona - François Doumen	Royal Diamond; Niall McCullagh - Tommy Carmody
Ascot Gold Cup	20 June	2 miles 4 furlongs	Ascot	Estimate; Ryan Moore - Sir Michael Stoute	Simenon; Johnny Murtagh - Willie Mullins	Top Trip; Mickael Barzalona - François Doumen
Goodwood Cup	1 August	2 miles	Goodwood	Brown Panther; Richard Kingscote - Tom Dascombe	Ahzeemah; Kieren Fallon - Saeed bin Suroor	Altano; Eduardo Pedroza - Andreas Wohler
Lonsdale Cup	23 August	2 miles 1/2 furlong	York	Ahzeemah; Silvestre de Sousa - Saeed bin Suroor	Simenon; Johnny Murtagh - Willie Mullins	Times Up; Ryan Moore - Ed Dunlop
Doncaster Cup	13 September	2 miles 2 furlongs	Doncaster	Times Up; Ryan Moore - Ed Dunlop	High Jinx; James Doyle - James Fanshawe	Repeater; Daniel Tudhope - David O'Meara
St. Leger Stakes	14 September	1 mile 6 furlongs	Doncaster	Leading Light; Joseph O'Brien - Aidan O'Brien	Talent; Jim Crowley - Ralph Beckett	Galileo Rock; Wayne Lordan - David Wachman
British Champions Long Distance Cup	19 October	2 miles	Ascot	Royal Diamond; Johnny Murtagh - Johnny Murtagh	Harris Tweed; George Baker - William Haggas	Eye of the Storm; Billy Lee - Aidan O'Brien

=== Fillies & Mares ===
Race	Date	Distance	Course	1st	2nd	3rd
1,000 Guineas	5 May	1 mile	Newmarket	Sky Lantern; Richard Hughes - Richard Hannon, Sr.	Just The Judge; Jamie Spencer - Charlie Hills	Moth; Joseph O'Brien - Aidan O'Brien
Epsom Oaks	22 June	1 mile 4 furlongs	Epsom	Talent; Richard Hughes - Ralph Beckett	Secret Gesture; Jim Crowley - Ralph Beckett	The Lark; Jamie Spencer - Michael Bell
Coronation Stakes	21 June	1 mile	Ascot	Sky Lantern; Richard Hughes - Richard Hannon, Sr.	Kenhope; Thierry Jarnet - Henri-Alex Pantall	Just The Judge; Jamie Spencer - Charles Hills
Falmouth Stakes	12 July	1 mile	Newmarket	Elusive Kate; William Buick - John Gosden	Sky Lantern; Richard Hughes - Richard Hannon, Sr.	Giofra; Christophe Soumillon - Alain de Royer-Dupré
Nassau Stakes	3 August	1 mile 2 furlongs	Goodwood	Winsili; William Buick - John Gosden	Thistle Bird; James Doyle - Roger Charlton	Hot Snap; Tom Queally - Lady Cecil
Yorkshire Oaks	22 August	1 mile 4 furlongs	York	The Fugue; William Buick - John Gosden	Venus de Milo; Ryan Moore - Aidan O'Brien	Secret Gesture; Jamie Spencer - Ralph Beckett
British Champions Fillies & Mares Stakes	19 October	1 mile 4 furlongs	Ascot	Seal of Approval; George Baker - James Fanshawe	Belle de Crecy; Johnny Murtagh - Johnny Murtagh	Talent; Jim Crowley - Ralph Beckett

== Final standings ==
=== Horses ===
Position	Horse	Division	Rating
1	Novellist	Middle Distance	129
2=	Al Kazeem	Middle Distance	126
2=	Toronado	Mile	126
4=	Dawn Approach	Mile	125
4=	Mukhadram	Middle Distance	125
4=	Olympic Glory	Mile	125

=== Jockeys ===
Position	Jockey	Rating	Wins-2nd-3rd
1	Richard Hughes	130	5-3-0
2	Johnny Murtagh	115	4-3-1
3	Joseph O'Brien	105	4-1-3
4	Ryan Moore	95	3-1-5
5	William Buick	90	3-2-2

=== Trainers ===
Position	Jockey	Rating	Wins-2nd-3rd
1	Aidan O'Brien	150	5-2-6
2	Richard Hannon, Sr.	115	4-3-1
3	John Gosden	80	3-1-2
4	Saeed bin Suroor	70	3-1-0
5	Jim Bolger	70	2-3-0
