= Pat Eddery Stakes =

Flat horse race in Great Britain

- Class: Listed
- Location: Ascot Racecourse; Ascot, England
- Inaugurated: 2006
- Race type: Flat / Thoroughbred
- Sponsor: Flexjet
- Website: Ascot

Race information
- Distance: 7f (1,408 metres)
- Surface: Turf
- Track: Straight
- Qualification: Two-year-olds
- Weight: 9 st 5 lb Allowances; 5 lb for fillies Penalties; 5 lb for Group winners 3 lb for Listed winners
- Purse: £50,000 (2025); 1st: £28,355

Pat Eddery Stakes
2026
Alfred Wallace	Silver Dominion	Dandyman Dan

Previous years
2025
Time To Turn	A Bit Of Spirit	Italica
2024
Al Qudra	New Century	Chancellor
2023
Rosallion	Al Musmak	Ancient Wisdom
2022
Naval Power	Waiting All Night	Mascapone
2021
New Science	Angel Bleu	Cachet

2020-2011
2020
Chindit	Cobh	Naval Crown
2019
Al Dabaran	Sun Power	Ropey Guest
2018
Victory Command	Glorious Lover	Nate The Great
2017
Raydiance	Another Batt	Alba Power
2016
Apex King	Monticello	Frankuus
2015
Sixth Sense	Platitude	Manaafidh
2014
Kodi Bear	Disegno	Muhaarar
2013
Washaar	Emirates Flyer	Lone Warrior
2012
Toronado	Strictly Silca	Verdane
2011
Talwar	Trumpet Major	Jack Who's He

2010-2006
2010
Toolain	Galtymore Lad	Premier Clarets
2009
Nideeb	Party Doctor	Navajo Chief
2008
Talking Hands	The Legal Blonde	Prime Delivery
2007
Raven's Pass	Unnefer	Mister Hardy
2006
Satulagi	Pires	Norisan

The Pat Eddery Stakes is a Listed flat horse race in Great Britain open to two-year-old horses. It is run at Ascot over a distance of 7 furlongs (1,408 metres), and it is scheduled to take place each year in July.

The event was originally named the Winkfield Stakes after Winkfield, a village located to the north of Ascot. It was established in 2006, and the inaugural running was won by Satulagi. It was permanently renamed in 2016 to honour Pat Eddery, an 11-time British Champion flat jockeys jockey who died in 2015.

The Pat Eddery Stakes is held at the same meeting as the King George VI and Queen Elizabeth Stakes.

== Records ==
Leading jockey (5 wins):

- William Buick - Sixth Sense (2015), New Science (2021), Naval Power (2022), Al Qudra (2024), Time To Turn (2025)

Leading trainer (5 wins):

- Charlie Appleby - Al Dabaran (2019), New Science (2021), Naval Power (2022), Al Qudra (2024), Time To Turn (2025)

== Winners ==
Year	Winner	Jockey	Trainer	Time
2006	Satulagi	John Egan	Stan Moore	1:28.46
2007	Raven's Pass	Jimmy Fortune	John Gosden	1:30.54
2008	Talking Hands	Jamie Spencer	Sylvester Kirk	1:29.43
2009	Nideeb	Ryan Moore	Clive Brittain	1:29.28
2010	Toolain	Philip Robinson	Michael Jarvis	1:29.72
2011	Talwar	Jimmy Fortune	Jeremy Noseda	1:30.17
2012	Toronado	Richard Hughes	Richard Hannon Sr.	1:30.47
2013	Washaar	Dane O'Neill	Richard Hannon Sr.	1:28.98
2014	Kodi Bear	Adam Kirby	Clive Cox	1:27.78
2015	Sixth Sense	William Buick	Mark Johnston	1:30.62
2016	Apex King	Andrea Atzeni	Ed Dunlop	1:27.07
2017	Raydiance	Jim Crowley	Karl Burke	1:31.95
2018	Victory Command	Silvestre de Sousa	Mark Johnston	1:29.25
2019	Al Dabaran	James Doyle	Charlie Appleby	1:31.27
2020	Chindit	Pat Dobbs	Richard Hannon Jr.	1:27.70
2021	New Science	William Buick	Charlie Appleby	1:28.06
2022	Naval Power	William Buick	Charlie Appleby	1:28.84
2023	Rosallion	Sean Levey	Richard Hannon Jr.	1:30.49
2024	Al Qudra	William Buick	Charlie Appleby	1:28.93
2025	Time To Turn	William Buick	Charlie Appleby	1:28.76
2026	Alfred Wallace	Oisin Murphy	Ed Walker	1:27.39

== See also ==
- Horse racing in Great Britain
- List of British flat horse races
