= Richard Hannon =

Richard Hannon may refer to:

- Richard Hannon Sr. (born 1945), British racehorse trainer
- Richard Hannon Jr. (born 1975), his son, British racehorse trainer
