= Dawn Approach =

Irish-bred Thoroughbred racehorse

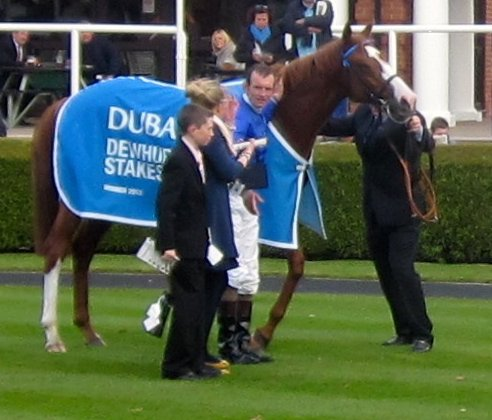
- Dawn Approach after winning the Dewhurst Stakes in 2012.
- Sire: New Approach
- Grandsire: Galileo
- Dam: Hymn of the Dawn
- Damsire: Phone Trick
- Sex: Colt
- Foaled: 23 April 2010
- Country: Ireland
- Colour: Chestnut
- Breeder: Jim Bolger
- Owner: Mrs J. S. Bolger; Godolphin
- Trainer: Jim Bolger
- Record: 12: 8-1-0
- Earnings: £926,780

Major wins
- Coventry Stakes (2012); Vincent O'Brien Stakes (2012); Dewhurst Stakes (2012); 2000 Guineas (2013); St James's Palace Stakes (2013)

Awards
- European Champion Two-Year-Old Colt (2012); Top-rated European two-year-old colt (2012)

Dawn Approach (foaled 23 April 2010) is an Irish Thoroughbred racehorse. In a racing career which began in March 2012, the colt won all seven of his races including the Coventry Stakes at Royal Ascot, the National Stakes at the Curragh and the Dewhurst Stakes at Newmarket. He ended the 2012 European season as the year's most highly rated two-year-old colt and was regarded as a leading contender for the 2013 classics. As a three-year-old, Dawn Approach won the classic 2000 Guineas on his first appearance, going on to win the St James Palace Stakes at Royal Ascot.

== Background ==
Dawn Approach is a chestnut horse with a white blaze and a long white sock on his right hind leg. He was bred by the Irish trainer Jim Bolger, and in the early part of his career carried the colours of Bolger's wife, Jackie, who owned the horse in partnership with J. P. Spain. Dawn Approach is from the first crop of foals sired by New Approach, a horse which won four Group One races including The Derby, and was the equal highest-rated Thoroughbred in the world when trained by Bolger in 2008. His dam, Hymn of the Dawn, was bred in the United States and was an unsuccessful racehorse in five starts, with her best effort a fourth place in the 2001 European Breeders Fund Maiden.

Like his sire, Dawn Approach was trained by Bolger in County Carlow and ridden in all of his races by Kevin Manning.

== Racing career ==
=== 2012: two-year-old season ===
Dawn Approach began his racing career unusually early, running at the Curragh in March, more than a month before his second birthday. In a five furlong maiden race he started even money favourite and won by one and three quarter lengths from Canary Row. After a break of almost two months, Dawn Approach reappeared in a minor race over six furlongs at Naas Racecourse in May. He was made the 4/6 favourite and won easily, beating his Curragh rival Canary Row by five and a half lengths. Dawn Approach returned to Naas nineteen days later for the Listed Rochestown Stakes and completed a hat trick, winning by two and three quarter lengths.

Two weeks after his second win at Naas Dawn Approach was sent to England and moved up in class to contest the Group Two Coventry Stakes at Royal Ascot. He pulled hard in the early stages before taking the lead approaching the final furlong. Despite hanging to the let he stayed on well in the closing stages to win by three quarters of a length from the Richard Hannon Sr.-trained Olympic Glory. The runner-up was unbeaten in three subsequent races including the Group One Prix Jean-Luc Lagardère at Longchamp. After his Ascot win, a controlling share in Dawn Approach was sold for an undisclosed sum to Sheikh Mohammed's Godolphin Racing organisation. Instead of moving the colt to the stable of Mahmood Al Zarooni or Saeed bin Suroor it was decided that he would remain in training with Bolger.

On his first racecourse appearance for almost three months, Dawn Approach started 2/5 favourite for the National Stakes at the Curragh on 15 September. Racing over seven furlongs for the first time he took the lead entering the final furlong and won easily by almost five lengths from the outsider Designs On Rome. Dawn Approach's final run of 2012 came in the Dewhurst Stakes at Newmarket in October, a race which Bolger had won four times previously with colts including the champions New Approach and Teofilo. In this race he was accompanied by his stable companion Leitir Mor, the winner of the Group Three Round Tower Stakes. Starting at odds of 3/10, he took the lead inside the final furlong from Leitir Mor and pulled clear to win by two and three quarter lengths. After the race Bolger described the colt as being "every bit as good as his sire" and as having a more "laid-back" and manageable temperament. The win confirmed Dawn Approach's position as favourite for the 2013 2000 Guineas, with bookmakers offering him at odds of 5/1.

Racing colours of Godolphin.

=== 2013: three-year-old season ===
Dawn Approach made his first appearance as a three-year-old in the 2000 Guineas at Newmarket on 4 May 2013. The race saw the first appearance on a British Racecourse since the Godolphin trainer Mahmood Al Zarooni had been banned for administering anabolic steroids to his horse. Despite strong betting support for the English colt Toronado, he started the 11/8 favourite in a field of thirteen runners. Dawn Approach raced just behind the leaders before taking the lead approaching the final furlong and drawing clear of the field to win by five lengths from the 150/1 outsider Glory Awaits. After the race Manning described the winner as "a very special horse" and indicated that the horse had the attributes and temperament to win The Derby. Bolger called the performance "very impressive" and said that the horse's future targets would be decided after discussion with Sheikh Mohammed.

At Epsom on 1 June Dawn Approach started favourite for the Epsom Derby over one and a half miles. He failed to settle in the race, fighting the efforts of Kevin Manning to restrain him, "fly-jumping... and throwing his head about." He took the lead over half a mile from the finish, but quickly dropped out of contention in the straight and finished last of the twelve runners behind Ruler of the World. After the race Bolger said that Dawn Approach "was fine for ten strides and then all hope was gone. He will not run over one and a half miles again." On the Monday following the race, Bolger stated that Dawn Approach had "collided with another horse jumping out of the stalls and that seemed to set him alight."

Less than three weeks after his defeat at Epsom, Dawn Approach returned to the one-mile distance for the St James's Palace Stakes at Royal Ascot. In this race he was opposed again by Toronado but his main challenger appeared to be Aidan O'Brien's Irish 2,000 Guineas winner Magician: Dawn Approach started the 5/4 favourite, with Magician on 5/2 and Toronado on 5/1. Manning settled the colt behind the leaders before moving up on the outside in the straight. Two furlongs from the finish Glory Awaits veered to the left, colliding with Magician, who in turn bumped Dawn Approach who in turn made contact with Toronado. Dawn Approach recovered from the incident to take the lead and got the better of a sustained struggle with Toronado to win by a short head. The racecourse stewards held an enquiry into the incident which had occurred early in the straight, but the result of the race was upheld.

A month and a half later Dawn Approach faced Toronado for the third time in the Sussex Stakes at Goodwood Racecourse. The race was billed as the second "Duel on the Downs" following the famous race between Frankel and Canford Cliffs in 2011. After Leitir Mor set a strong pace, Dawn Approach took the lead approaching the final furlong but was overtaken in the closing stages and was beaten half a length by Toronado. Eleven days later Dawn Approach started favourite for the Prix Jacques Le Marois at Deauville Racecourse but after pulling hard in the early stages he faded to finish fifth behind Moonlight Cloud, Olympic Glory, Intello and Declaration of War. After a two-month break, the colt returned for his final race, the Queen Elizabeth II Stakes at Ascot on 19 October. He again started favourite but made little impact, finishing fourth behind Olympic Glory, Top Notch Tonto and Kingsbarns. Bolger felt that the colt did not handle the soft ground, saying "He came there very easily two down and gave himself every chance but just floundered in it".

== Assessment and awards ==
In November, Dawn Approach was named European Champion two-year-old colt at the Cartier Racing Awards. In the 2012 European Thoroughbred Racehorse Rankings, he was given a rating of 124, six pounds clear of his closest rival Kingsbarns.

In the 2013 edition of the World's Best Racehorse Rankings Dawn Approach was rated the joint-eleventh best horse in the world and the joint-third best three-year-old colt behind Toronado and Olympic Glory, and level with Magician, Intello and Will Take Charge.

== Stud record ==
After his retirement from racing he began his career as a stallion at the Kildangan Stud in County Kildare. His stud fee for the 2014 breeding season was €35,000. After reduced demand in 2020 Dawn Approach transferred to Redmondstown Stud in County Wexford, the breeding operation of his former trainer Jim Bolger.

=== Notable progeny ===
c = colt, f = filly, g = gelding

Foaled	Name	Sex	Major Wins
2016	Madhmoon	c	Golden Fleece Stakes, Desmond Stakes
2018	Paulele	c	Winterbottom Stakes
2018	Poetic Flare	c	2000 Guineas Stakes, St James's Palace Stakes
2016	Wise Ruler	c	Newcastle 30th Aug 2019

== Pedigree ==
Pedigree of Dawn Approach (IRE), chestnut colt, 2010
Sire New Approach (IRE) 2005	Galileo; 1998	Sadler's Wells	Northern Dancer
Sire New Approach (IRE) 2005	Galileo; 1998	Sadler's Wells	Fairy Bridge
Sire New Approach (IRE) 2005	Galileo; 1998	Urban Sea	Miswaki
Sire New Approach (IRE) 2005	Galileo; 1998	Urban Sea	Allegretta
Sire New Approach (IRE) 2005	Park Express; 1983	Ahonoora	Lorenzaccio
Sire New Approach (IRE) 2005	Park Express; 1983	Ahonoora	Helen Nichols
Sire New Approach (IRE) 2005	Park Express; 1983	Matcher	Match
Sire New Approach (IRE) 2005	Park Express; 1983	Matcher	Lachine
Dam Hymn of the Dawn (USA) 1999	Phone Trick; 1982	Clever Trick	Icecapade
Dam Hymn of the Dawn (USA) 1999	Phone Trick; 1982	Clever Trick	Kankakee Miss
Dam Hymn of the Dawn (USA) 1999	Phone Trick; 1982	Over the Phone	Finnegan
Dam Hymn of the Dawn (USA) 1999	Phone Trick; 1982	Over the Phone	Prattle
Dam Hymn of the Dawn (USA) 1999	Colonial Debut; 1994	Pleasant Colony	His Majesty
Dam Hymn of the Dawn (USA) 1999	Colonial Debut; 1994	Pleasant Colony	Sun Colony
Dam Hymn of the Dawn (USA) 1999	Colonial Debut; 1994	Kittihawk Miss	Alydar
Dam Hymn of the Dawn (USA) 1999	Colonial Debut; 1994	Kittihawk Miss	Kittiwake (Family: 4-m)
