= Kingman (British horse) =

British-bred Thoroughbred racehorse

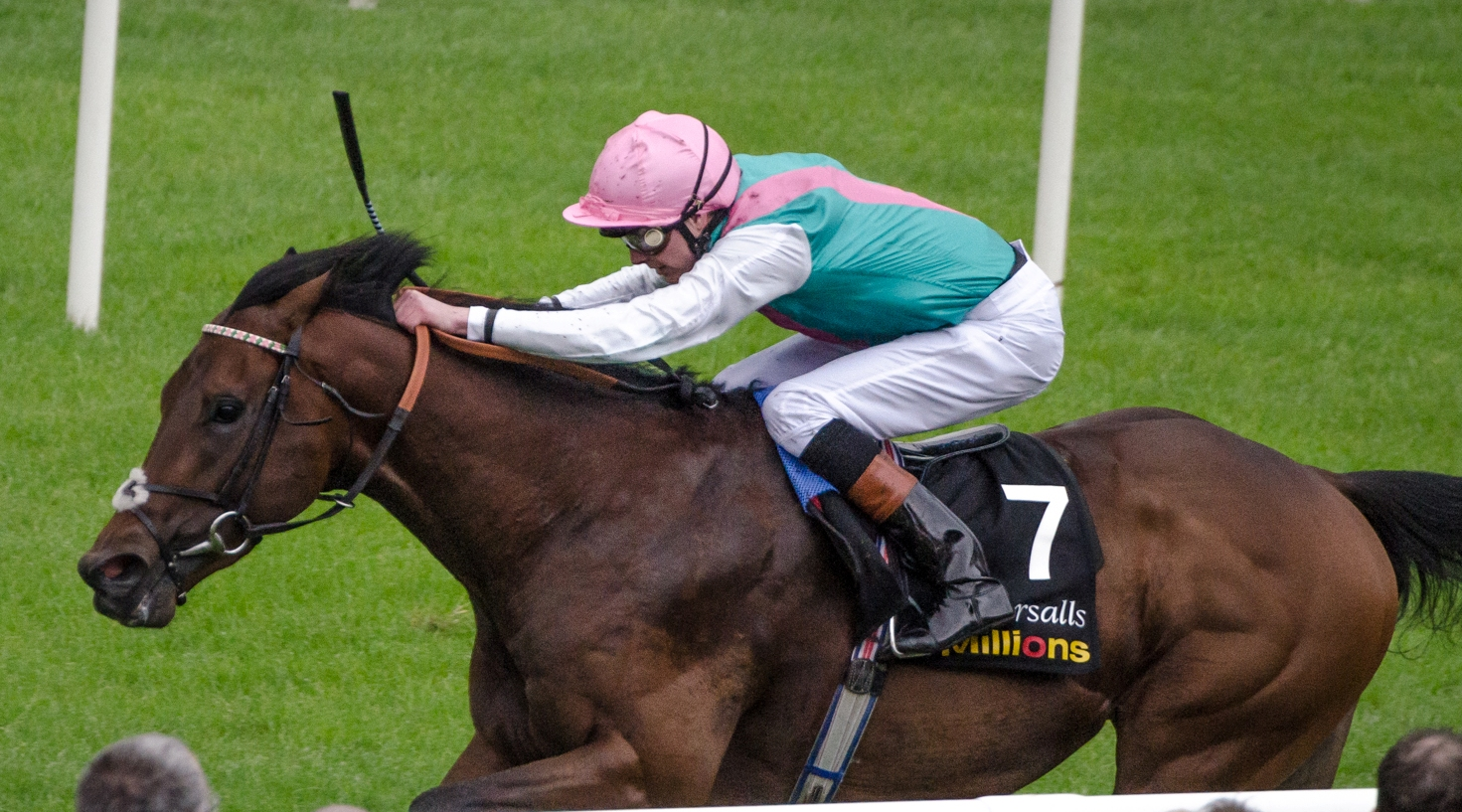
- Kingman at the Irish 2000 Guineas
- Sire: Invincible Spirit
- Grandsire: Green Desert
- Dam: Zenda
- Damsire: Zamindar
- Sex: Stallion
- Foaled: 26 February 2011
- Country: Great Britain
- Colour: Bay
- Breeder: Juddmonte Farms
- Owner: Khalid Abdullah
- Trainer: John Gosden
- Jockey: James Doyle
- Record: 8: 7–1–0

Major wins
- Solario Stakes (2013); Greenham Stakes (2014); Irish 2000 Guineas (2014); St. James's Palace Stakes (2014); Sussex Stakes (2014); Prix Jacques Le Marois (2014)

Awards
- Cartier Horse of the Year (2014); Cartier Champion Three-year-old Colt (2014); World's top-rated three-year-old colt (2014); Timeform rating: 134
- Last updated on 1 May 2025

Kingman (foaled 26 February 2011) is a champion British Thoroughbred racehorse who was the 2014 European Horse of the Year after winning the Irish 2000 Guineas, St. James's Palace Stakes, Sussex Stakes and Prix Jacques le Marois. He is now a successful sire.

The horse is owned by Khalid Abdullah and was trained by John Gosden.

== Racing career ==
=== 2013: two-year-old season ===
Kingman's career began with a six-length win in a maiden race at Newmarket under jockey Ryan Moore. Moore was impressed by the colt but called the ante-post price for the 2000 Guineas of 10/1 an overreaction. His next race was the Group 3 Solario Stakes at Sandown Park Racecourse this time with Khalid Abdullah's new retained jockey James Doyle on board. Kingman won by two lengths from Godolphin's colt Emirates Flyer. Following the win his price for the 2,000 Guineas was again cut. Gosden shared plans for a run in the Dewhurst Stakes but these were scrapped following a bone chip.

=== 2014: three-year-old season ===
Following recovery from an operation to remove the bone chip, Kingman made his three-year-old debut in the Greenham Stakes at Newbury Racecourse. He accelerated in the final two furlongs to win by four and a half lengths. Following the victory the Guineas price was once again cut with some bookmakers making Kingman joint favourite to the Aidan O'Brien trained Australia Kingman started favourite for the 2000 Guineas at Newmarket but was beaten into second place by Night of Thunder, with Australia in third place. On 24 May, Kingman recorded his first Group One success when he won the Irish 2000 Guineas at the Curragh Racecourse.

On 18 June at Royal Ascot, Kingman reversed the Newmarket result, beating Night of Thunder by two and a quarter lengths in the St James's Palace Stakes. For his next race, the Sussex Stakes at Goodwood, he was matched against the Richard Hannon-four-year-old Toronado in what was billed as a second Duel on the Downs. He won by a length from Toronado, with Darwin in third. The colt was then sent to France for the Prix Jacques le Marois over 1600 metres at Deauville Racecourse on 17 August. He started the 2/7 favourite against four opponents, headed by the Queen Elizabeth II Stakes winner Olympic Glory. Doyle restrained him at the back of the field before taking the lead 200 metres from the finish and drew clear to win by two and a half lengths from Anodin, who beat Olympic Glory and Rizeena in a close race for second.

Kingman's retirement from racing was announced on 22 September. He had contracted a throat infection which prevented him from being trained for projected runs in the Queen Elizabeth II Stakes and the Breeders' Cup Mile.

== Stud career ==
Kingman has stood at Banstead Manor Stud alongside Frankel since the 2015 breeding season. His first yearlings sold for up to 1.7 million guineas in 2017. In 2018, he sired Group 2 Coventry Stakes winner Calyx at Royal Ascot, Group 3 winner Persian King and three further stakes winners from his first crop of two-year-olds. He was the fourth leading sire in Europe by yearling average behind Galileo, Dubawi and Frankel.

=== Notable progeny ===
c = colt, f = filly, g = gelding

Foaled	Name	Dam	Sex	Major Wins
2016	Persian King	Pretty Please	c	Poule d'Essai des Poulains, Prix d'Ispahan, Prix du Moulin de Longchamp
2017	Kinross	Ceilidh House	c	Prix de la Forêt, British Champions Sprint Stakes
2017	Palace Pier	Beach Frolic	c	St James's Palace Stakes, Prix Jacques Le Marois (twice), Lockinge Stakes, Queen Anne Stakes
2017	Domestic Spending	Urban Castle	g	Hollywood Derby, Turf Classic Stakes, Manhattan Stakes
2018	Schnell Meister	Serienholde	c	NHK Mile Cup
2020	Commissioning	Sovereign Parade	f	Fillies' Mile
2020	Feed The Flame	Knyazhna	c	Grand Prix de Paris
2020	King Colorado	More Aspen	c	The J. J. Atkins
2020	Sauterne	Salicorne	f	Prix du Moulin de Longchamp
2020	Zardozi	Chanderi	f	VRC Oaks
2021	Elmalka	Nahrain	f	1000 Guineas Stakes
2021	Friendly Soul	In Clover	f	Prix de l'Opéra, Prix Vermeille
2021	Sparking Plenty	Speralita	f	Prix de Diane
2022	Field of Gold	Princess de Lune	c	Irish 2,000 Guineas, St James's Palace Stakes

== Assessment and awards ==
In November, Kingman was named Champion Three-year-old Colt and Horse of the Year at the Cartier Racing Awards.

In the 2014 World's Best Racehorse Rankings, Kingman was rated the third-best horse to race anywhere in the world in 2014 behind the Japanese horses Just A Way and Epiphaneia and level with Able Friend, Australia, The Grey Gatsby, and Variety Club, making him the joint top-rated three-year-old.

== Pedigree ==
Pedigree of Kingman (GB), bay colt, 2011
Sire Invincible Spirit (IRE) 1997	Green Desert; 1983	Danzig	Northern Dancer
Sire Invincible Spirit (IRE) 1997	Green Desert; 1983	Danzig	Pas de Nom
Sire Invincible Spirit (IRE) 1997	Green Desert; 1983	Foreign Courier	Sir Ivor
Sire Invincible Spirit (IRE) 1997	Green Desert; 1983	Foreign Courier	Courtly Dee
Sire Invincible Spirit (IRE) 1997	Rafha; 1987	Kris	Sharpen Up
Sire Invincible Spirit (IRE) 1997	Rafha; 1987	Kris	Doubly Sure
Sire Invincible Spirit (IRE) 1997	Rafha; 1987	Eljazzi	Artaius
Sire Invincible Spirit (IRE) 1997	Rafha; 1987	Eljazzi	Border Bounty
Dam Zenda (GB) 1999	Zamindar; 1994	Gone West	Mr Prospector
Dam Zenda (GB) 1999	Zamindar; 1994	Gone West	Secrettame
Dam Zenda (GB) 1999	Zamindar; 1994	Zaizafon	The Minstrel
Dam Zenda (GB) 1999	Zamindar; 1994	Zaizafon	Mofida
Dam Zenda (GB) 1999	Hope; 1991	Dancing Brave	Lyphard
Dam Zenda (GB) 1999	Hope; 1991	Dancing Brave	Navajo Princess
Dam Zenda (GB) 1999	Hope; 1991	Bahamian	Mill Reef
Dam Zenda (GB) 1999	Hope; 1991	Bahamian	Sorbus (Family: 19)
