= Olympic Glory =

Irish-bred Thoroughbred racehorse

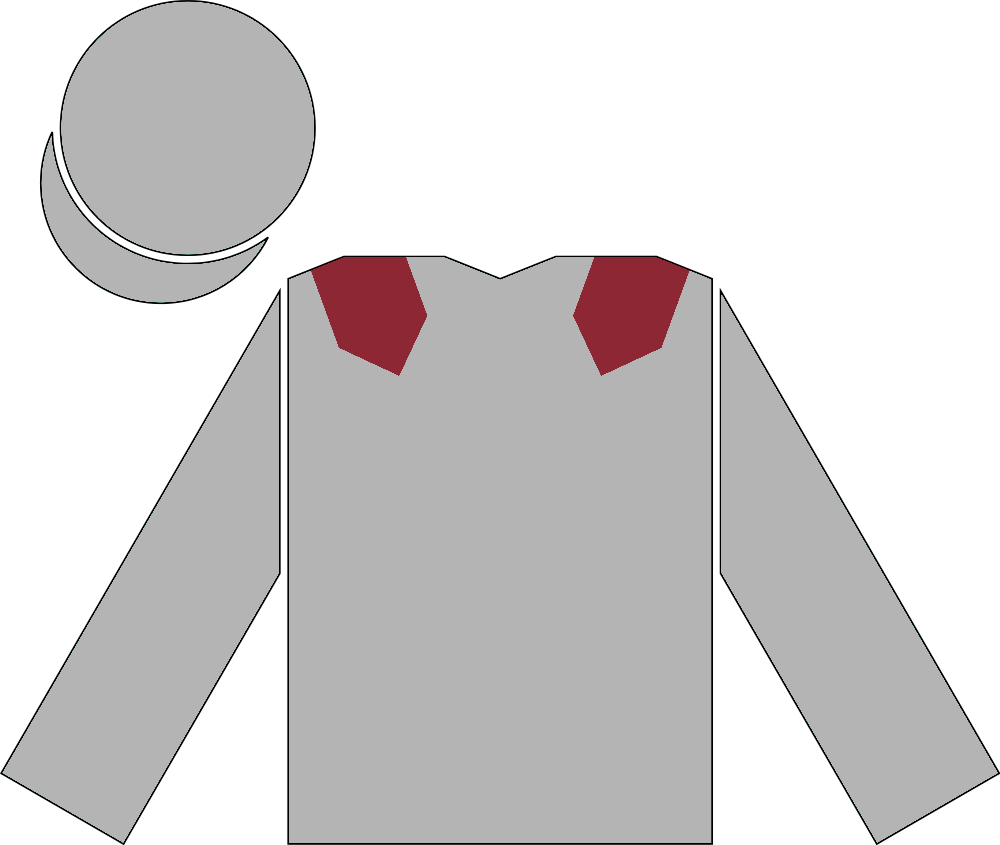
- Racing colours of Sheikh Joaan al Thani
- Sire: Choisir
- Grandsire: Danehill Dancer
- Dam: Acidanthera
- Damsire: Alzao
- Sex: Colt
- Foaled: 27 March 2010
- Country: Ireland
- Colour: Bay
- Breeder: Denis McDonnell
- Owner: Julie Wood; Al Shaqab Racing
- Trainer: Richard Hannon Sr. Richard Hannon Jr.
- Record: 15:8-3-1
- Earnings: £1,219,773

Major wins
- Superlative Stakes (2012); Vintage Stakes (2012); Prix Jean-Luc Lagardère (2012); Greenham Stakes (2013); Queen Elizabeth II Stakes (2013); Lockinge Stakes (2014); Prix de la Forêt (2014)

Awards
- Equal top-rated British two-year-old (2012); World top-rated three-year-old colt (2013)

Olympic Glory (foaled 27 March 2010) is an Irish-bred, British-trained Thoroughbred racehorse. He was one of the leading two-year-olds in Europe in 2012 when he won the Superlative Stakes, Vintage Stakes and Prix Jean-Luc Lagardère. His only defeat came when he finished second to the European Champion Two-Year-Old Colt Dawn Approach. He won the Greenham Stakes on his debut but ran poorly in his next race and was off the course for three months. He returned to finish second against older horses in both the Prix Jacques Le Marois and the Prix du Moulin before recording his most important success in the Queen Elizabeth II Stakes. In the following year he won the Lockinge Stakes and the Prix de la Forêt

== Background ==
Olympic Glory is a bay colt with a narrow white blaze and a white sock on his left hind leg bred by Denis McDonnell at his Parkway Stud in County Cork. He was sired by Choisir, an Australian sprinter who won the Golden Jubilee Stakes and King's Stand Stakes at Royal Ascot in 2003. Choisir operates as a shuttle stallion, moving between the Coolmore Stud's Irish and Australian bases and has also sired many successful racehorses including Starspangledbanner and Sacred Choice. Olympic Glory's dam Acidanthera won one minor race, but came from a good family being a descendant of the broodmare Violetta. Other horses descended from Violetta include the classic winners Sir Percy, Teenoso Harayir and Rule of Law.

On 31 August 2011, the yearling was put up for auction on the opening day of the Doncaster Premier Yearling Sale and was bought for £65,000 by the bloodstock agents Peter and Ross Doyle. He entered the ownership of Julie Wood and was sent into training with Richard Hannon Sr. at East Everleigh in Wiltshire. He was ridden in most of his races by Richard Hughes before Frankie Dettori took over in 2014.

== Racing career ==
=== 2012: two-year-old season ===
Olympic Glory began his racing career on 8 June 2012 when he ran in a six-furlong maiden race at Goodwood Racecourse. He started the 6/4 favourite and won by three and a quarter lengths from Dark Emerald. Eleven days later he was moved up sharply in class to contest the Group Two Coventry Stakes at Royal Ascot. With Hughes opting to ride the Hannon-trained favourite Sir Prancealot, Olympic Glory was ridden by Dane O'Neill and started a 20/1 outsider. He was towards the rear of the field in the early stages before making steady progress in the last quarter mile to finish second, three-quarters of a length behind Dawn Approach.

Olympic Glory was unbeaten in his remaining three races. At Newmarket Racecourse on 14 July, he started 6/4 favourite for the Group Two Superlative Stakes over seven furlong on heavy ground and won by a head from Birdman. On 1 August he started 11/4 second favourite for the Group Two Vintage Stakes at Goodwood. Hughes struggled to obtain a clear run in the straight and was ninth of the ten runners entering the final furlong. Switched to the outside, he produced a strong burst of acceleration to take the lead in the last strides and won by half a length from Artigiano.

In September 2012, Olympic Glory was bought privately by the Qatari Sheikh Joaan Al Thani. On 7 October at Longchamp Racecourse, Olympic Glory was one eight colts to contest the Group One Prix Jean-Luc Lagardère over 1400 metres. Hughes positioned the colt close to the inside rail before moving to the outside 300m from the finish. He took the lead inside the last 100m and won by one and a quarter lengths from What A Name. After the race the colt was supported in the betting for the following year's 2000 Guineas, but the trainer's son, Richard Hannon Jr., warned that the stable had a number of good colts and that other target were being considered.

=== 2013: three-year-old season ===
On his three-year-old debut, Olympic Glory ran in the Greenham Stakes (a trial race for the 2000 Guineas) over seven furlongs at Newbury Racecourse on 20 April, when he was matched against Moohaajim, a colt who had won the Mill Reef Stakes and been narrowly beaten in the Middle Park Stakes. Starting the 8/11 favourite, he took the lead 150 Yard yards from the finish and won by a length from Sir Patrick Moore, with Moohaajim in third place. Hannon and Al Thani were represented by Toronado in the 2000 Guineas, leaving Olympic Glory to run in the French equivalent, the Poule d'Essai des Poulains at Longchamp on 12 May. He was towards the rear of the field from the start and was never able to reach the leaders, finishing eleventh of the seventeen runners, five lengths behind the winner Style Vendome.

After a three-month break, Olympic Glory returned in August when he was matched against older horses for the first time in the Prix Jacques Le Marois at Deauville Racecourse. The field for the 1600m event was a strong one, including Dawn Approach, Moonlight Cloud, Intello, Declaration of War and Elusive Kate. Ridden for the first time by Al Thani's retained jockey Frankie Dettori, Olympic Glory was briefly blocked in the straight but produced a strong late run, failing by a short head to catch the five-year-old mare Moonlight Cloud. The colt remained in France for his next run, the Prix du Moulin at Lonchamp on 15 September. The five-year-old Maxios established a big lead early in the straight and was never challenged, with Olympic Glory, the odds-on favourite, finishing second, five lengths behind the winner.

Olympic Glory raced in Britain for the first time in six months when he ran in the Queen Elizabeth II Stakes, part of the British Champions Day card at Ascot on 19 October. The colt was equipped with blinkers for the first time and was reunited with Hughes, as Dettori had been injured in a fall. He started at odds of 11/2 against eleven opponents including Dawn Approach (the 2/1 favourite), Maxios, Kingsbarns, Elusive Kate, Gordon Lord Byron and Soft Falling Rain. Hughes restrained the colt at the back of the field before moving forward with three furlongs left to run. He took the lead approaching the final furlong and won by three and a quarter lengths from Top Notch Tonto, with Kingsbarns in third place. The colt's victory enabled Hannon to become champion trainer for the fourth time. After the race, Hannon revealed that the blinkers had been fitted on the recommendation of Richard Hughes, commenting; "You employ good men and that's what you pay them for." On his final appearance of the season, Olympic Glory was sent to the United States to contest the Breeders' Cup Mile at Santa Anita Park. He was made the 9/2 second favourite, but was never in contention and finished ninth of the ten runners behind Wise Dan.

At the end of the 2013 season Richard Hannon retired and passed the running of his stable to his son Richard Hannon Jr.

=== 2014: four-year-old season ===
On his four-year-old debut, Olympic Glory started the 11/8 favourite for the Group One Lockinge Stakes over the straight mile course at Newbury, in which his opponents included the highly regarded American import Verrazano. The colt was retrained by Dettori in sixth place before making progress in the final quarter mile. He took the lead a furlong from the finish and accelerated clear to win by two and a quarter lengths from the Sandown Mile winner Tullius, with Verrazano in third. Olympic Glory was then moved up in distance for the Prix d'Ispahan over 1850 metres at Longchamp on 25 May. Starting the 15/8 second favourite he raced in second place for much of the race but proved no match for Cirrus des Aigles and faded in the closing stages to finish fourth, three and half lengths behind the winner.

In August made his second attempt to win the Prix Jacques Le Marois in which he was matched against the leading British three-year-old Kingman. After being restrained by Dettori in the early stages he moved up to dispute the lead 300 metres out but was quickly overtaken and faded to finish third behind Kingman and the French-trained four-year-old Anodin.

Olympic Glory was dropped back in distance to contest the Group One Prix de la Forêt over 1400 metres at Longchamp on 5 October and started the 9/2 second favourite. Racing against specialist sprinters, he looked outpaced for most of the way, but finished strongly, taking the lead 75 yards from the finish and won going away by two lengths and a head from Gordon Lord Byron and the Spanish colt Noozhoh Canarias.

== Assessment ==
In the 2012 International Classification, an official rating of the best European two-year-olds, Olympic Glory was given a rating of 117, placing him equal third behind Dawn Approach (124) and Kingsbarns (118). He was the highest-rated British two-year-old, level with Reckless Abandon. In the 2013 World Thoroughbred Racehorse Rankings Olympic Glory was rated equal with Toronado as the seventh best racehorse in the world and the best three-year-old colt.

== Stud career ==
=== Notable progeny ===
c = colt, f = filly, g = gelding

Foaled	Name	Sex	Major wins
2016	Grand Glory	f	Prix Jean Romanet
2016	Watch Me	f	Coronation Stakes, Prix Rothschild

== Pedigree ==
Pedigree of Olympic Glory (IRE), bay colt, 2010
Sire Choisir (AUS) 1999	Danehill Dancer (IRE); 1993	Danehill	Danzig
Sire Choisir (AUS) 1999	Danehill Dancer (IRE); 1993	Danehill	Razyana
Sire Choisir (AUS) 1999	Danehill Dancer (IRE); 1993	Mira Adonde	Sharpen Up
Sire Choisir (AUS) 1999	Danehill Dancer (IRE); 1993	Mira Adonde	Lettre d'Amore
Sire Choisir (AUS) 1999	Great Selection (AUS); 1990	Lunchtime	Silly Season
Sire Choisir (AUS) 1999	Great Selection (AUS); 1990	Lunchtime	Great Occasion
Sire Choisir (AUS) 1999	Great Selection (AUS); 1990	Pensieve Mood	Biscay
Sire Choisir (AUS) 1999	Great Selection (AUS); 1990	Pensieve Mood	Staid
Dam Acidanthera (GB) 1995	Alzao (USA); 1980	Lyphard	Northern Dancer
Dam Acidanthera (GB) 1995	Alzao (USA); 1980	Lyphard	Goofed
Dam Acidanthera (GB) 1995	Alzao (USA); 1980	Lady Rebecca	Sir Ivor
Dam Acidanthera (GB) 1995	Alzao (USA); 1980	Lady Rebecca	Pocahontas
Dam Acidanthera (GB) 1995	Amaranthus (GB); 1987	Shirley Heights	Mill Reef
Dam Acidanthera (GB) 1995	Amaranthus (GB); 1987	Shirley Heights	Hardiemma
Dam Acidanthera (GB) 1995	Amaranthus (GB); 1987	Amaranda	Bold Lad
Dam Acidanthera (GB) 1995	Amaranthus (GB); 1987	Amaranda	Favoletta (Family 3-c)
