= Domestic spending =

Domestic spending may refer to:

- Consumption (economics)
- Investment (macroeconomics)
- Government spending

Other:

- Domestic Spending (horse), a British-bred American-owned Thoroughbred race horse
