= Duel on the Downs =

- Sussex Stakes
- Location: Goodwood Racecourse
- Date: 27 July 2011
- Winning horse: Frankel
- Starting price: 8/13 Fav
- Jockey: Tom Queally
- Trainer: Henry Cecil
- Owner: Khalid Abdullah

The Duel on the Downs was the name given to the 2011 running of the Sussex Stakes horse race. It took place at Goodwood Racecourse on 27 July 2011. The race featured a clash between the undefeated three-year-old Frankel and the leading older miler Canford Cliffs. The races nickname derived from the fact that the racecourse is situated on the South Downs.

== The contenders ==
The race attracted only four runners, three from the United Kingdom and one from France. Frankel, trained by Henry Cecil at Newmarket and ridden by Tom Queally started the 8/13 favourite. Having been named the Cartier Champion Two-year-old Colt of 2010 after winning the Royal Lodge Stakes and the Dewhurst Stakes, Frankel had taken his unbeaten run to seven with wins in the Greenham Stakes, 2000 Guineas (by six lengths) and St James's Palace Stakes. He was opposed by Canford Cliffs, a four-year-old trained by Richard Hannon Sr. in Wiltshire and ridden by Richard Hughes who started at odds of 7/4. After finishing third in the 2010 running of the 2000 Guineas, he had won five consecutive Group One races: the Irish 2000 Guineas, St James's Palace Stakes, Sussex Stakes, Lockinge Stakes and Queen Anne Stakes. During his winning sequence, Canford Cliffs had decisively defeated many top horses including Goldikova, Xtension, Makfi, Rip Van Winkle, Twice Over and Cape Blanco. The other two runners both started at odds of 22/1. Rio de La Plata from the Godolphin stable was a six-year-old who had won eight races including the Grand Critérium, Premio Vittorio di Capua and Premio Roma. The French challenger was the four-year-old Rajsaman, winner of the Prix de Fontainebleau, Prix Perth and Prix du Muguet.

== Race details ==
- Sponsor: QIPCO
- Winner's prize money: £170,130
- Going: Good
- Number of runners: 4
- Winner's time: 1:37.47
