= Toronado (horse) =

Irish-bred Thoroughbred racehorse

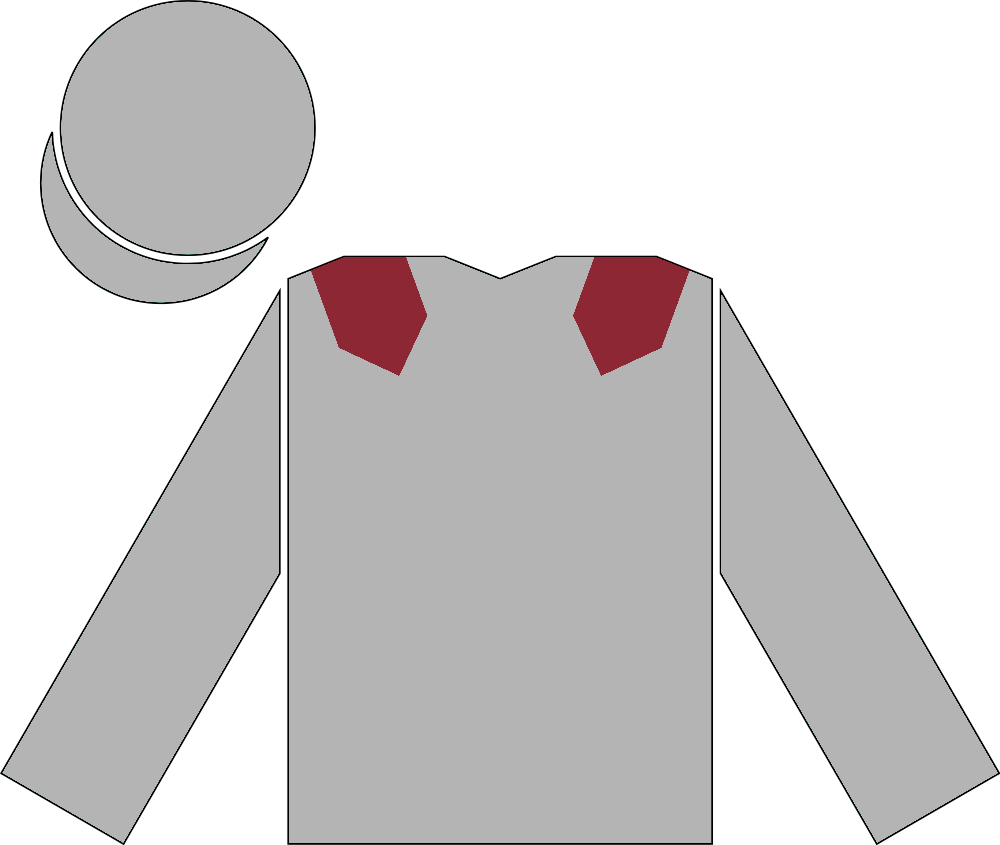
- Racing colours of Sheikh Joaan al Thani
- Sire: High Chaparral
- Grandsire: Sadler's Wells
- Dam: Wana Doo
- Damsire: Grand Slam
- Sex: Colt
- Foaled: 20 February 2010
- Country: Ireland
- Colour: Bay
- Breeder: Paul Nataf
- Owner: "Carmichael Humber"; Joaan Bin Hamad Al Thani
- Trainer: Richard Hannon Sr.
- Record: 12:6-3-0
- Earnings: £754,081

Major wins
- Winkfield Stakes (2012); Champagne Stakes (2012); Craven Stakes (2013); Sussex Stakes (2013); Queen Anne Stakes (2014)

Toronado (foaled 20 February 2010) is an Irish-bred, British-trained Thoroughbred racehorse. He was one of the leading British two-year-olds of 2012 when he was undefeated in three races including the Champagne Stakes at Doncaster. After winning the Craven Stakes on his three-year-old debut he came to be regarded as a leading contender for the 2000 Guineas and Epsom Derby. In the summer of 2013 he developed a rivalry with Dawn Approach and defeated the Irish colt to record his most important win in the Sussex Stakes. In 2014 he won the Queen Anne Stakes but was beaten by Kingman in the Sussex Stakes and by Charm Spirit in the Prix du Moulin and finished unplaced when favourite for the Breeders' Cup Mile.

== Background ==
Toronado is a bay colt with a white blaze and white socks on his front legs bred in Ireland by Paul Nataf. His sire High Chaparral won The Derby in 2002 and the Breeders' Cup Turf in 2002 and 2003. As a stallion he was best known as the sire of So You Think. His dam Wana Doo is a Kentucky bred mare who won two races in France. Wana Doo is a half sister to Casamento (winner of the Racing Post Trophy 2010). She is a descendant of Regal Lady, a half-sister of the Prix de l'Arc de Triomphe winner Vaguely Noble.

In December 2010, the foal was consigned by the Haras d'Ommeel to the Arqana Sales at Deauville where he was bought for €40,000 by representatives of the British Bloodstock Agency (Ireland). Toronado returned to the Arqana Sales in August 2011 as a yearling and was sold for €55,000 to the bloodstock agent Amanda Skiffington. The colt entered the ownership of "Carmichael Humber" and was sent into training with Richard Hannon Sr. at East Everleigh in Wiltshire. He was named after Tornado, occasionally known as Toronado, the horse ridden by the popular fictional character Zorro. The colt has been ridden in all of his races by Richard Hughes.

== Racing career ==
=== 2012: two-year-old season ===
Toronado began his racing career at Newbury Racecourse on 14 June 2012 when he started the 11/4 second favourite for a maiden race over six and a half furlongs. He took an early lead but was headed by the favourite, Ayaar, before regaining the advantage a furlong from the finish and drawing clear to win by two and three quarter lengths from One Word More, Ayaar and seven others. On 21 July Toronado was moved up in class to contest the Listed Winkfield Stakes over seven furlongs at Ascot Racecourse. Starting the 1/3 favourite in a field of six runners, he took the lead entering the final furlong and won by two lengths from the filly Strictly Silca. After the race both Hannon and Hughes identified the colt as a classic contender.

On 15 September at Doncaster Racecourse, Toronado was matched against the Acomb Stakes winner Dundonnell in the Group Two Champagne Stakes over seven furlongs. Dundonnell was made the 5/6 favourite, with Toronado starting at odds of 11/4. Hughes sent Toronado into the lead from the start and held off the challenge of the favourite inside the final furlong to win by half a length. In the 2012 European Thoroughbred Racehorse Rankings, he was given a rating of 114, placing him in equal ninth, ten pounds below the top-rated Dawn Approach.

=== 2013: three-year-old season ===
In early 2013, the colt was sold privately to the Qatari Sheikh Joaan Bin Hamad Al Thani. Toronado made his three-year-old debut on 18 April when he started the 8/11 favourite for the Craven Stakes at Newmarket Racecourse in which he was required to concede three pounds to his rivals Dundonnell, Havana Gold (Somerville Tattersall Stakes), and Tawhid (Horris Hill Stakes). Toronado led from the start, pulled clear in the closing stages, and won by four lengths from Havana Gold. After the race, Hannon praised the winner, saying; "He's a machine. We’ve always known he's a good horse and good horses can quicken and quicken again which is what he did today."

In the 2000 Guineas on 4 May, Toronado started the 11/4 second favourite in a field of thirteen runners. He briefly led the field two furlongs from the finish but faded in the closing stages to finish fourth, 7 1/2 lengths behind winner Dawn Approach. The only explanation offered by the Hannon stable was that the colt might have suffered a "displaced palate" during the race: Richard Hannon Jr. announced that in future races Toronado would be fitted with a tongue-tie.

Toronado returned to racing at Royal Ascot on 18 June when he started the 5/1 third favourite for the St James's Palace Stakes behind Dawn Approach and the Irish 2,000 Guineas winner, Magician. Toronado started slowly and was restrained at the back of the nine-runner field before moving up on the outside in the straight. He was hampered in the straight but recovered to contest the finish in a sustained struggle with Dawn Approach, losing by a short head in a photo finish.

A month and a half later, Toronado faced Dawn Approach for the third time in the Sussex Stakes at Goodwood Racecourse. The race was billed as the second "Duel on the Downs" following the famous race between Frankel and Canford Cliffs in 2011. Toronado settled in second last whilst Dawn Approach's pacemaker, Leitir Mor, set a strong pace. Dawn Approach made his move three furlongs from home as Toronado traveled behind Declaration of War. Hughes then switched Toronado left giving him a clear run at Dawn Approach. Toronado overtook the favourite inside the final furlong and won by half a length. After the race, Hannon said: "Revenge is sweet, I suppose, but they are two good horses. Richard Hughes said the other morning in work that he was the best he has ever ridden. You know, with Canford Cliffs and everything, we have had some good horses, but he is very good." The Prix Jacques Le Marois and the Queen Elizabeth II Stakes where mentioned as future targets.

In August, Toronado was moved up in distance for the International Stakes over 10 1/2 furlongs at York Racecourse where he started second favourite behind the Eclipse Stakes winner Al Kazeem. Toronado was held up at the back of the six-runner field but when the pace quickened in the straight, he began to struggle and was eased down by Hughes, finishing the race tailed off in last place behind Declaration of War. Hannon announced that the colt had again suffered from a displaced palate and that he would probably undergo corrective surgery before returning to the one-mile distance in autumn.

On 22 October, Toronado returned for a public workout at Lingfield Park Racecourse after which Hannon Jr. announced that the colt would not run again in 2013 as "he clearly needs a bit more time". At the end of 2013, Hannon Sr. retired, with his son taking over the stable.

In the 2013 edition of the Longines World's Best Racehorse Rankings, Toronado and his stable companion Olympic Glory were both given a rating of 125, making them the highest-rated three-year-old colts in the world.(Joint Champions)

=== 2014: four-year-old season ===
Toronado did not appear as a four-year-old until June, when he started 4/5 favourite for the Queen Anne Stakes at Royal Ascot in which his main rivals appeared to be the American import Verrazano and the South African five-year-old Soft Falling Rain. Hannon was highly confident in the build-up to the race, predicting that his trainee would "take the breath away". Hughes restrained the colt towards the rear of the field before beginning to make progress two furlongs out. He overtook the French challenger Anodin inside the final furlong and won by three-quarters of a length from Verrazano. After the race, Joaan Al Thani's racing manager, Harry Herbert said "It's so exciting. I'm thrilled to bits for everyone involved. It's a great piece of training from Richard Hannon and his team. Hughesie loves this horse, the confidence going into the race was scary. If there was an issue it was he hadn't run for 300 days, which is a long time off in this sort of competition. When asked about the horse's targets, Hannon said, "We'll stick to a mile with him, the Sussex Stakes is highly likely, there's also the Marois but Olympic Glory will probably run in that and then later there's the QEII". Toronado's next race was indeed the Sussex, in which he was matched against the leading three-year-old Kingman. The race was billed as a second Duel on the Downs after the 2011 edition of the race in which the Hannon stable's four-year-old Canford Cliffs was defeated by the three-year-old Frankel. The first six furlongs of the race were run a slow pace, with Toronado tracking the Aidan O'Brien-trained Darwin. Toronado then accelerated into the lead but was caught inside the final furlong by Kingman and beaten into second place by a length. After the race, Herbert said: "There's no immediate plan, we need the dust to settle. There's not a whole lot of options but he's a wonderful horse and I don't think he lost anything in defeat."

Toronado was then sent to France and started the 6/4 favourite for the Prix du Moulin at Longchamp Racecourse against a field which included the 2000 Guineas winner Night of Thunder. He was always among the leaders but after a prolonged struggle in the straight, he was beaten a head by the Freddy Head-trained three-year-old Charm Spirit with Night of Thunder a neck away in third. Toronado was then sent to the United States and started the 2.1/1 favourite for the Breeders' Cup Mile. After disputing the lead with Obviously for most of the way, he ran wide on the final turn and faded in the straight to finish eighth of the fourteen runners behind Karakontie.

== Stud career ==
Toronado serves as a shuttle stallion between his owners Al Shaqab stables in France, and Swettenham Stud in Australia.

=== Notable progeny ===
c = colt, f = filly, g = gelding

Foaled	Name	Sex	Major Wins
2016	Mariamia	f	The Galaxy
2016	Masked Crusader	g	William Reid Stakes
2016	Shelby Sixtysix	g	The Galaxy
2016	Tribhuvan	g	United Nations Stakes, Manhattan Stakes
2017	Bois D'Argent	g	Doomben Cup
2018	Victor The Winner	g	Centenary Sprint Cup
2019	Helios Express	g	Hong Kong Classic Mile
2023	Tron Bolt	c	J. J. Atkins

== Pedigree ==
Pedigree of Toronado (IRE), bay colt, 2010
Sire High Chaparral (Ire) 1999	Sadler's Wells (USA); 1981	Northern Dancer	Nearctic
Sire High Chaparral (Ire) 1999	Sadler's Wells (USA); 1981	Northern Dancer	Natalma
Sire High Chaparral (Ire) 1999	Sadler's Wells (USA); 1981	Fairy Bridge	Bold Reason
Sire High Chaparral (Ire) 1999	Sadler's Wells (USA); 1981	Fairy Bridge	Special
Sire High Chaparral (Ire) 1999	Kasora (Ire); 1993	Darshaan	Shirley Heights
Sire High Chaparral (Ire) 1999	Kasora (Ire); 1993	Darshaan	Delsy
Sire High Chaparral (Ire) 1999	Kasora (Ire); 1993	Kozana	Kris
Sire High Chaparral (Ire) 1999	Kasora (Ire); 1993	Kozana	Koblenza
Dam Wana Doo (USA) 2000	Grand Slam (USA); 1995	Gone West	Mr. Prospector
Dam Wana Doo (USA) 2000	Grand Slam (USA); 1995	Gone West	Secrettame
Dam Wana Doo (USA) 2000	Grand Slam (USA); 1995	Bright Candles	El Gran Senor
Dam Wana Doo (USA) 2000	Grand Slam (USA); 1995	Bright Candles	Christmas Bonus
Dam Wana Doo (USA) 2000	Wedding Gift (FR); 1993	Always Fair	Danzig
Dam Wana Doo (USA) 2000	Wedding Gift (FR); 1993	Always Fair	Carduel
Dam Wana Doo (USA) 2000	Wedding Gift (FR); 1993	Such Style	Sassafras
Dam Wana Doo (USA) 2000	Wedding Gift (FR); 1993	Such Style	Regal Lady (Family 1-d)
