= Greenham Stakes =

Flat horse race in Britain

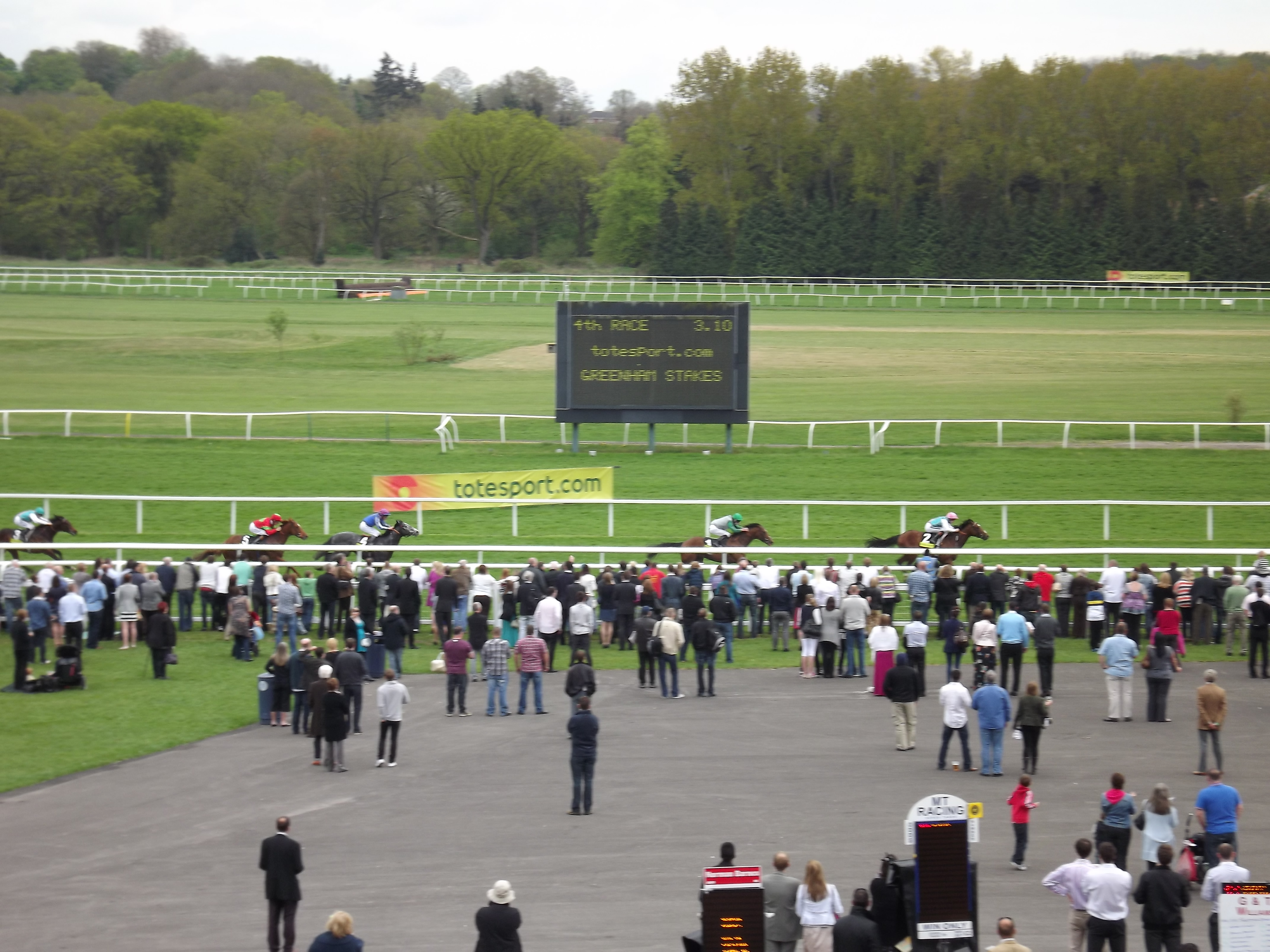
- Frankel winning the 2011 running
- Class: Group 3
- Location: Newbury Racecourse; Newbury, Berkshire, England
- Inaugurated: 1906
- Race type: Flat / Thoroughbred
- Sponsor: Watership Down Stud
- Website: Newbury

Race information
- Distance: 7f (1,408 metres)
- Surface: Turf
- Track: Straight
- Qualification: Three-year-old colts and geldings
- Weight: 9 st 0 lb
- Purse: £55,000 (2021); 1st: £31,191

Greenham Stakes
2026
| Alparslan | Zavateri | Albert Einstein |

Previous years
2025
Jonquil | Rashabar | Saracen
2024
Esquire | Zoum Zoum | El Bodon
2023
Isaac Shelby | Charyn | Theoryofeverything
2022
Perfect Power | Lusail | Angel Bleu
2021
Chindit | Mehmento | The Lir Jet

2020-2011
2019
Mohaather | Great Scot | Urban Icon
2018
James Garfield | Expert Eye | Hey Gaman
2017
Barney Roy | Dream Castle | Zainhom
2016
Tasleet | Knife Edge | Log Out Island
2015
Muhaarar | Estidhkaar | Ivawood
2014
Kingman | Night of Thunder | Master Carpenter
2013
Olympic Glory | Sir Patrick Moore | Moohaajim
2012
Caspar Netscher | Boomerang Bob | Bronterre
2011
Frankel | Excelebration | Shropshire

2010-2001
2010
Dick Turpin | Canford Cliffs | Arcano
2009
Vocalised | Cityscape | Icesolator
2008
Paco Boy | Bobs Surprise | Red Alert Day
2007
Major Cadeaux | Dutch Art | Halicarnassus
2006
Red Clubs | Marcus Andronicus | Assertive
2005
Indesatchel | Johnny Jumpup | Galeota
2004
Salford City | Fokine | So Will I
2003
Muqbil | Zafeen | Mister Links
2002
Redback | Guys And Dolls | Chinook
2001
Munir | Frenchmans Bay | Imperial Dancer

2000-1991
2000
Barathea Guest | Distant Music | Winning Venture
1999
Enrique | Exeat | Perugino Bay
1998
Victory Note | La-Faah | Merlin's Ring
1997
Yalaietanee | Revoque | Muchea
1996
Danehill Dancer | Kahir Almaydan | Tagula
1995
Celtic Swing | Bahri | Moon King
1994
Turtle Island | Luhuk | Cool Jazz
1993
Inchinor | Wolfhound | Swing Low
1992
Lion Cavern | River Falls | Swing Low
1991
Bog Trotter | Mukaddamah | Shalford

1990-1981
1990
Rock City | Montendre | Rami
1989
Zayyani | Lunar Mover | Batshoof
1988
Zelphi | Intimidate | Gallic League
1987
Risk Me | Deputy Governor | Bellotto
1986
Faustus | Lead On Time | Hallgate
1985
Bairn | Bassenthwaite | Efisio
1984
Creag-an-Sgor | Defecting Dancer | Northern Tempest
1983
Wassl | Proclaim | All Systems Go
1982
Cajun | Tender King | Macmillion
1981
Another Realm | Age Quod Agis | Beldale Flutter

1980-1970
1980
Final Straw | Monteverdi | Posse
1979
Kris | Young Generation | Marquee Universal
1978
Derrylin | Weth Nan | Double Form
1977
He Loves Me | Tachypous | Gallant Welsh
1976
Wollow | Super Cavalier | Gentilhombre
1975
Mark Anthony | Grundy | Great Ball
1974
Glen Strae | Appleby Fair | Welsh Harmony
1973
Boldboy | Lunchtime | Mon Fils
1972
Martinmas | Sharpen Up | Do Battle
1971
Mill Reef | Breeders Dream | Swing Easy
1970
Gold Rod | Duke of Parma | Ring Round The Moon

The Greenham Stakes is a Group 3 flat horse race in Great Britain open to three-year-old colts and geldings. It is run over a distance of 7 furlongs (1,408 metres) at Newbury in April.

== History ==
The event is named after Greenham, the civil parish where Newbury Racecourse is located. It was established in 1906, and was initially contested over a mile.

The race continued with its original length until the start of World War II. It was not staged from 1941 to 1948, and resumed with a distance of 7 furlongs and 60 yards in 1949. It was shortened to 7 furlongs in 1956.

The Greenham Stakes can serve as a trial for various colts' Classics in Europe. The last winner to achieve victory in the 2000 Guineas was Frankel in 2011, and the most recent 2,000 Guineas winner to compete in the Greenham Stakes was Night of Thunder, the 2014 runner-up.

== Records ==
Leading jockey (5 wins):

- Steve Donoghue – Sydmonton (1911), Polygnotus (1919), Silvern (1920), Green Fire (1924), Zelina (1934)
- Joe Mercer – Counsel (1955), Heathen (1968), Boldboy (1973), Kris (1979), Creag-an-Sgor (1984)

Leading trainer (6 wins):

- Sir Henry Cecil – Wollow (1976), Kris (1979), Cajun (1982), Faustus (1986), Enrique (1999), Frankel (2011)
- Richard Hannon Sr. – Rock City (1990), Redback (2002), Major Cadeaux (2007), Paco Boy (2008), Dick Turpin (2010), Olympic Glory (2013)

== Winners ==
| Year | Winner | Jockey | Trainer | Time |
|---|---|---|---|---|
| 1906 | Rocketter | Billy Higgs | Sam Darling |
| 1907 | Donna Caterina | Billy Higgs | Percy Peck |
| 1908 | Sir Toby | Danny Maher | Percy Peck | 1:55.00 |
| 1909 | Minoru | Herbert Jones | Richard Marsh |
| 1910 | Bronzino | Freddie Fox | Willie Pratt |
| 1911 | Sydmonton | Steve Donoghue | Richard Dawson |
| 1912 | Jingling Geordie | Frank Wootton | Sam Darling |
| 1913 | Shogun | Frank Wootton | Stanley Wootton |
| 1914 | Sunny Lake | Herbert Randall | Richard Marsh | 1:50.60 |
| 1915 (dh) | Let Fly; Sunfire | Ernest Huxley; William Huxley | Fred Leader; Charles Morton |
| 1916 | Analogy | Joe Childs | Richard Dawson | 1:40.80 |
| 1917-18 | no race |
| 1919 | Polygnotus | Steve Donoghue | Sam Loates |
| 1920 | Silvern | Steve Donoghue | Frank Hartigan |
| 1921 | Meeting Abandoned due to a National Coal Strike |
| 1922 | Weathervane | Herbert Jones | Richard Marsh |
| 1923 | Parth | Arthur Walker | James Crawford | 1:53.00 |
| 1924 | Green Fire | Steve Donoghue | Charles Morton | 1:40.60 |
| 1925 | Sparus | Frank Bullock | Alec Taylor Jr. | 1:46.80 |
| 1926 | Friar Wile | Joe Childs | Fred Darling | 1:47.00 |
| 1927 | Lordland | Archie Burns | Richard Gooch | 1:51.60 |
| 1928 | The Wheedler (Note: In 1928, John o' London finished first, but was disqualified for bumping.) | Joe Childs | Fred Darling | 1:50.60 |
| 1929 | Sidonia | Richard Perryman | Tom Cannon Jr. | 1:40.00 |
| 1930 | Christopher Robin | Rufus Beasley | Victor Gilpin | 1:43.00 |
| 1931 | Link Boy | Bobby Dick | Joseph Lawson | 1:43.80 |
| 1932 | Orwell | Bobby Jones | Joseph Lawson | 1:52.40 |
| 1933 | Harinero | Cecil Ray | Richard Dawson | 1:43.60 |
| 1934 | Zelina | Steve Donoghue | Hugh Powney | 1:42.20 |
| 1935 | Theft | Gordon Richards | Frank Butters | 1:43.60 |
| 1936 | Noble King | Richard Perryman | Frank Butters | 1:50.40 |
| 1937 | Fairford | Tommy Weston | Harry Cottrill | 1:47.60 |
| 1938 | Mirza | Harry Wragg | Frank Butters | 1:42.40 |
| 1939 | Fairstone | Cliff Richards | Harry Cottrill | 1:42.20 |
| 1940 | Tant Mieux | Gordon Richards | Fred Darling | 1:43.40 |
| 1941–48 | no race |
| 1949 | Star King | Doug Smith | Jack Waugh | 1:30.20 |
| 1950 | Port o'Light | Tommy Gosling | Walter Nightingall | 1:33.80 |
| 1951 | Abandoned due to waterlogging |
| 1952 | Serpenyoe | Frankie Durr | William Smyth | 1:31.80 |
| 1953 | March Past | Ted Fordyce | Ken Cundell | 1:31.00 |
| 1954 | Infatuation | Bill Rickaby | Vic Smyth | 1:31.20 |
| 1955 | Counsel | Joe Mercer | Jack Colling | 1:33.00 |
| 1956 | Ratification | Harry Carr | Vic Smyth | 1:27.60 |
| 1957 | Pipe of Peace | Scobie Breasley | Gordon Richards | 1:27.80 |
| 1958 | Paresa | Bill Rickaby | Reg Day | 1:28.40 |
| 1959 | Masham | Doug Smith | Geoffrey Brooke | 1:36.20 |
| 1960 | Filipepi | Geoff Lewis | Ron Smyth | 1:30.00 |
| 1961 | Primus | Doug Smith | Gordon Richards | 1:35.20 |
| 1962 | Romulus | Wally Swinburn | Fulke Johnson Houghton | 1:28.80 |
| 1963 | Fighting Ship | S Smith | Jack Jarvis | 1:35.20 |
| 1964 | Excel | Frankie Durr | Tommy Gosling | 1:31.40 |
| 1965 | Silly Season | Geoff Lewis | Ian Balding | 1:36.60 |
| 1966 | Abandoned due to snow |
| 1967 | Play High | Duncan Keith | Walter Nightingall | 1:28.60 |
| 1968 | Heathen | Joe Mercer | Dick Hern | 1:28.00 |
| 1969 | Tower Walk | Taffy Thomas | Geoffrey Barling | 1:23.40 |
| 1970 | Gold Rod | Frankie Durr | Reg Akehurst | 1:38.60 |
| 1971 | Mill Reef | Geoff Lewis | Ian Balding | 1:27.81 |
| 1972 | Martinmas | Philip Waldron | Ian Balding | 1:32.00 |
| 1973 | Boldboy | Joe Mercer | Dick Hern | 1:27.01 |
| 1974 | Glen Strae | Tony Murray | Ryan Price | 1:28.12 |
| 1975 | Mark Anthony | Lester Piggott | Clive Brittain | 1:41.71 |
| 1976 | Wollow | Gianfranco Dettori | Henry Cecil | 1:26.06 |
| 1977 | He Loves Me | Tony Kimberley | Jeremy Hindley | 1:29.90 |
| 1978 | Derrylin | Eric Eldin | Doug Smith | 1:33.19 |
| 1979 | Kris | Joe Mercer | Henry Cecil | 1:28.02 |
| 1980 | Final Straw | Greville Starkey | Michael Stoute | 1:24.61 |
| 1981 | Another Realm | Greville Starkey | Frankie Durr | 1:32.12 |
| 1982 | Cajun | Lester Piggott | Henry Cecil | 1:25.25 |
| 1983 | Wassl | Willie Carson | John Dunlop | 1:31.20 |
| 1984 | Creag-An-Sgor | Joe Mercer | Charlie Nelson | 1:26.91 |
| 1985 | Bairn | Lester Piggott | Luca Cumani | 1:29.78 |
| 1986 | Faustus | Steve Cauthen | Henry Cecil | 1:35.98 |
| 1987 | Risk Me | Steve Cauthen | Paul Kelleway | 1:38.39 |
| 1988 | Zelphi | Pat Eddery | Jeremy Tree | 1:29.12 |
| 1989 | Zayyani | Billy Newnes | Fulke Johnson Houghton | 1:31.72 |
| 1990 | Rock City | Pat Eddery | Richard Hannon Sr. | 1:28.22 |
| 1991 | Bog Trotter | Lester Piggott | William Haggas | 1:26.49 |
| 1992 | Lion Cavern | Steve Cauthen | André Fabre | 1:32.04 |
| 1993 | Inchinor | Frankie Dettori | Roger Charlton | 1:30.38 |
| 1994 | Turtle Island | John Reid | Peter Chapple-Hyam | 1:30.89 |
| 1995 | Celtic Swing | Kevin Darley | Lady Herries | 1:24.31 |
| 1996 | Danehill Dancer | Pat Eddery | Neville Callaghan | 1:30.18 |
| 1997 | Yalaietanee | Frankie Dettori | Michael Stoute | 1:26.07 |
| 1998 | Victory Note | John Reid | Peter Chapple-Hyam | 1:33.27 |
| 1999 | Enrique | Kieren Fallon | Henry Cecil | 1:25.19 |
| 2000 (Note: The 2000 running took place at Newmarket) | Barathea Guest | Philip Robinson | George Margarson | 1:26.88 |
| 2001 | Munir | Richard Hills | Barry Hills | 1:31.64 |
| 2002 | Redback | Darryll Holland | Richard Hannon Sr. | 1:23.84 |
| 2003 | Muqbil | Willie Supple | John Dunlop | 1:24.48 |
| 2004 | Salford City | Johnny Murtagh | David Elsworth | 1:26.97 |
| 2005 | Indesatchel | Jamie Spencer | David Wachman | 1:29.24 |
| 2006 | Red Clubs | Michael Hills | Barry Hills | 1:25.69 |
| 2007 | Major Cadeaux | Richard Hughes | Richard Hannon Sr. | 1:23.66 |
| 2008 | Paco Boy | Richard Hughes | Richard Hannon Sr. | 1:27.14 |
| 2009 | Vocalised | Kevin Manning | Jim Bolger | 1:27.81 |
| 2010 | Dick Turpin | Ryan Moore | Richard Hannon Sr. | 1:22.72 |
| 2011 | Frankel | Tom Queally | Henry Cecil | 1:24.60 |
| 2012 | Caspar Netscher | Shane Kelly | Alan McCabe | 1:32.32 |
| 2013 | Olympic Glory | Richard Hughes | Richard Hannon Sr. | 1:26.14 |
| 2014 | Kingman | James Doyle | John Gosden | 1:26.95 |
| 2015 | Muhaarar | Frankie Dettori | Charles Hills | 1:20.80 |
| 2016 (Note: The 2016 running took place at Chelmsford City) | Tasleet | Paul Hanagan | William Haggas | 1:25.38 |
| 2017 | Barney Roy | James Doyle | Richard Hannon Jr. | 1:23.08 |
| 2018 | James Garfield | Frankie Dettori | George Scott | 1:26.98 |
| 2019 | Mohaather | Jim Crowley | Marcus Tregoning | 1:26.89 |
| | no race 2020 (Note: The 2020 running was cancelled because of the COVID-19 pandemic in the United Kingdom) |
| 2021 | Chindit | Pat Dobbs | Richard Hannon Jr. | 1:23.98 |
| 2022 | Perfect Power | Christophe Soumillon | Richard Fahey | 1:22.77 |
| 2023 | Isaac Shelby | Sean Levey | Brian Meehan | 1:29.05 |
| 2024 | Esquire | Daniel Tudhope | David O'Meara | 1:25.17 |
| 2025 | Jonquil | Oisin Murphy | Andrew Balding | 1:24.42 |
| 2026 | Alparslan (Note: The 2026 winner Alparslan was later exported to Hong Kong and renamed Dandy Lion) | Clifford Lee | Karl Burke | 1:24.92 |

== See also ==
- Horse racing in Great Britain
- List of British flat horse races
