= British Champions Day =

Thoroughbred horse race meeting

British Champions Day is a thoroughbred horse race meeting held at Ascot Racecourse in October each year since 2011, which acts as the end of season highlight fixture of British flat racing. Until 2024 it was the culmination of the British Champions Series and featured the finals of the five divisions of the series, together with a valuable one-mile handicap race. It is the richest day in British racing, with more than £4 million in prize money across the six races in 2016.

== History ==
It was created by drawing together a number of historic races which had been features of Ascot and Newmarket's end of season meetings for many years. These were the Diadem Stakes and Queen Elizabeth II Stakes from Ascot, and the Champion Stakes, Jockey Club Cup and Pride Stakes from Newmarket. In the new fixture, these became the finals of each of the divisions of the British Champions Series.

The Queen Elizabeth II Stakes and Champion Stakes retained their names and became the finals of the Mile and Middle Distance divisions respectively. The Diadem Stakes became the British Champions Sprint, the Jockey Club Cup became the British Champions Long Distance Cup, and the Pride Stakes became the British Champions Fillies' and Mares' Stakes. The British Champions Series was discontinued in 2025.

== Races ==
Race Name	Grade	Distance	Age/Sex	Prize Money
British Champions Long Distance Cup	Group 1	2m	3yo +	£300,000
British Champions Sprint Stakes	Group 1	6f	3yo +	£600,000
British Champions Fillies' and Mares' Stakes	Group 1	1m 4f	3yo + FM	£550,000
Queen Elizabeth II Stakes	Group 1	1m	3yo +	£1,100,000
Champion Stakes	Group 1	1m 2f	3yo +	£1,300,000
Balmoral Handicap	Handicap	1m	3yo +	£250,000
Yet to named 2yo race	Conditions	6f	2yo	£250,000

== Frankel ==
The unbeaten colt, Frankel, won the Queen Elizabeth II Stakes at the 2011 meeting, and a year later completed his racing career with victory in the Champion Stakes at the 2012 meeting. The crowd of 32,000 at that meeting was a modern-day autumn flat racing record in the UK.

== See also ==
- 2011 British Champions Series
- 2013 British Champions Series
- Breeders' Cup, analogous event in U.S. Thoroughbred racing
- Breeders Crown, analogous event in North American harness racing
