= Cajun (horse) =

Irish-bred Thoroughbred racehorse

- Sire: Red Regent
- Grandsire: Prince Regent
- Dam: Ermyn Lass
- Damsire: Ennis
- Sex: Stallion
- Foaled: 3 April 1979
- Country: Ireland
- Colour: Chestnut
- Breeder: J A Dene
- Owner: James H Stone
- Trainer: Henry Cecil
- Record: 13: 3-2-3

Major wins
- Chesham Stakes (1981); Middle Park Stakes (1981); Greenham Stakes (1982)

Awards
- Timeform rating 120 (1981), 120 § (1982)

Cajun (3 April 1979 – ca. 1995) was an Irish-bred, British-trained Thoroughbred racehorse and sire. He was a talented but temperamental horse who won three of his thirteen races between June 1981 and September 1982. As a two-year-old he won the Chesham Stakes on his second appearance and was placed in the Richmond Stakes and the Seaton Delaval Stakes before ending the year win a win in the Middle Park Stakes. He began his second season with a victory in the Greenham Stakes but was beaten in five subsequent races and was retired from racing at the end of the year. After his retirement he was exported to become a breeding stallion in Japan.

== Background ==
Cajun was a chestnut horse with a small white star bred in Ireland by J A Dene and was described as a "well-made, attractive" colt with a "very smooth, daisy-cutting action". He was from the first crop of foals sired by Red Regent, a well-traveled horse whose biggest wins came in the City and Suburban Handicap and the Hessen-Pokal and who also competed in Spain and the United States. His dam Ermyn Lass was a moderate racehorse whose only success came in a selling race. The best of her other foals was Ubedizzy, a talented sprinter (rated 119 by Timeform) who was banned from racing in Britain owing to his "savage" temperament. Ermyn Lass was a granddaughter of the Irish broodmare Brosna, whose other descendants have included Celtic Arms.

As a yearling Cajun was offered for sale and was bought for 33,000 guineas by the bloodstock agent Tote Cherry-Downes of behalf of the trainer Henry Cecil. Cecil later recalled "I had glandular fever at the time so he was acting on my behalf. He kept ringing me up and saying what a lovely colt he was... in the end I said "for God's sake get on with it then"- I got rather fed up with his persistency. I couldn't wait to criticise the horse when he got back but I found it very difficult. He's a lovely colt." The colt entered training with Cecil at his Warren Place stable in Newmarket, Suffolk and was owned during his racing career by James H Stone.

== Racing career ==
=== 1981: two-year-old season ===
After finishing fourth over five furlongs on his racecourse debut Cajun was moved up in class and distance for the Chesham Stakes over six furlongs at Royal Ascot in June. He took the lead in the last quarter mile and looked likely to win easily but had to be driven out to hold of the late challenge of Treboro by three quarters of a length. He was strongly fancied for the July Stakes at Newmarket Racecourse but after being restrained in the early stages he finished fifth of the eleven runners behind the Barry Hills-trained End of the Line. In the Richmond Stakes at Goodwood Racecourse three weeks later he produced a better effort to finish second by a neck to Tender King, with End of the Line in third place. Cajun was then stepped up in distance for the Seaton Delaval Stakes over seven furlongs at Newcastle Racecourse. He looked certain to win easily when he joined the leaders two furlongs from the finish but failed to make any further progress and finished third behind Zilos and Telephone Man. He was then dropped in class for a minor event over six furlongs at Windsor Racecourse in September. After leading from the start he began to struggle in the final furlong and was beaten a neck by the filly Epithet.

Following four consecutive defeats Cajun was moved up to Group One level and started a 20/1 outsider for the Middle Park Stakes at Newmarket on 1 October. Tender King and End of the Line were again in opposition, whilst the other nine runners included Hays (winner of the Mill Reef Stakes), Peterhof (Flying Childers Stakes), Chiris's Lad (runner-up in the Coventry Stakes), Take the Floor (runner-up in the Gimcrack Stakes) and Philip Martin (third in the National Stakes). Ridden by Lester Piggott, Cajun raced at the rear of the field as the 66/1 outsider Lucky Hunter set the pace. but began to make rapid progress approaching the final furlong. He went to the front in the closing stages and won by three quarters of a length from Lucky Hunter with Wattlefield a neck away in third. Cecil was summoned by the racecourse stewards to explain the improvement in Cajun's form and said that the colt was difficult, had hesitated in his run at Windsor and performed much better than expected up the Newmarket hill.

=== 1982: three-year-old season ===
On his three-year-old debut, Cajun contested the Greenham Stakes (a major trial race for the 2000 Guineas) over seven furlongs at Newbury Racecourse in April. Ridden by Piggott he started at odds of 7/2 and won by half a length from Tender King. On 15 May the colt started 4/1 second favourite for the Irish 2,000 Guineas at the Curragh but finished ninth of the fourteen runners behind Dara Monarch. Later that month he started odd-on favourite for the Gus Demmy Memorial stakes over six furlongs at Haydock Park but finished third behind Not For Show and Vaigly Star. At Royal Ascot in June he finished unplaced behind Fearless Lad in the King's Stand Stakes. After a break of almost three months he returned in the Park Stakes at Doncaster Racecourse in September. As in some of his previous races he looked a likely winner but found little when put under pressure and finished third to The Quiet Bidder and Merlin's Charm. On his final appearance of the year he was equipped with blinkers for the Diadem Stakes at Ascot. He reportedly showed little interest in the race and finished unplaced behind Indian King.

== Assessment ==
In the official International Classification of European two-year-olds for 1981 Cajun was given a rating of 81, seven pounds behind the top-rated Green Forest. The independent Timeform organisation rated him on 120, twelve pounds behind their best two-year-old Wind and Wuthering. In their annual Racehorse of 1981 Timeform described him as "among the best of his age". In the following year Timeform gave him a rating of 120 §, with the § or "squiggle" indicating that he was "somewhat ungenerous" and could not be relied upon to produce his best form.

== Stud record ==
At the end of his racing career Cajun was retired to become a breeding stallion at the Ashleigh Stud in County Dublin in 1983 but was exported to Japan a year later. He stood in Japan until 1995 but sired very few foals after 1991. The best of his offspring were the Grade 3 winners Tomoe Regent, Oratorio and Lincoln City.

== Pedigree ==
Pedigree of Cajun (IRE), chestnut stallion, 1979
Sire Red Regent (IRE) 1972	Prince Regent (FR); 1966	Right Royal	Owen Tudor
Sire Red Regent (IRE) 1972	Prince Regent (FR); 1966	Right Royal	Bastia
Sire Red Regent (IRE) 1972	Prince Regent (FR); 1966	Noduleuse	Nosca
Sire Red Regent (IRE) 1972	Prince Regent (FR); 1966	Noduleuse	Quemandeuse
Sire Red Regent (IRE) 1972	Redowa (GB); 1964	Red God	Nasrullah
Sire Red Regent (IRE) 1972	Redowa (GB); 1964	Red God	Spring Run
Sire Red Regent (IRE) 1972	Redowa (GB); 1964	Sally Deans	Fun Fair
Sire Red Regent (IRE) 1972	Redowa (GB); 1964	Sally Deans	Cora Deans
Dam Ermyn Lass (GB) 1963	Ennis (GB); 1954	Golden Cloud	Gold Bridge
Dam Ermyn Lass (GB) 1963	Ennis (GB); 1954	Golden Cloud	Rainstorm
Dam Ermyn Lass (GB) 1963	Ennis (GB); 1954	First House	Link Boy
Dam Ermyn Lass (GB) 1963	Ennis (GB); 1954	First House	Early Doors
Dam Ermyn Lass (GB) 1963	Rye Girl (GB); 1949	Blue Water	Blue Peter
Dam Ermyn Lass (GB) 1963	Rye Girl (GB); 1949	Blue Water	Rydal
Dam Ermyn Lass (GB) 1963	Rye Girl (GB); 1949	Brosna	Coup de Lyon
Dam Ermyn Lass (GB) 1963	Rye Girl (GB); 1949	Brosna	Orotava (Family:4-i)
