= Domestic Spending =

American thoroughbred racehorse

- Sire: Kingman (GB)
- Grandsire: Invincible Spirit (IRE)
- Dam: Urban Castle
- Damsire: Street Cry (IRE)
- Sex: Gelding
- Foaled: 24 February 2017
- Country: United States
- Color: Bay
- Breeder: Rabbah Bloodstock Limited
- Owner: Klaravich Stables
- Trainer: Chad C. Brown
- Record: 8 : 6-1-1
- Earnings: $1,432,100

Major wins
- Hollywood Derby (2020); Turf Classic Stakes (2021); Manhattan Stakes (2021)
- Last updated on 31 October 2022

Domestic Spending (foaled February 24, 2017) is a British-bred American-owned multiple Grade 1 turf winning Thoroughbred racehorse. His Grade I wins include the Hollywood Derby in 2020 and Turf Classic Stakes and Manhattan Stakes in 2021.

== Background ==
Domestic Spending is a bay gelding who was bred in Great Britain by Rabbah Bloodstock. He was sired by Kingman, a champion British Thoroughbred racehorse who was the 2014 European Horse of the Year. His dam Urban Castle, is the only registered foal out of the stakes-winning Street Cry daughter who died in 2017. His second dam, Cloud Castle (by In the Wings), was a Group 3 winner (1998 Nell Gwyn Stakes) who twice placed in Group 1 company. She produced 11 winners. Seth Klarman's Klaravich Stables purchased Domestic Spending for the equivalent of 300,000 guineas (US$412,320) from Highclere Stud's consignment to Book 1 of the 2018 Tattersalls October Yearling Sale. The horse had to be gelded because he would not train. Kingman stands at Banstead Manor Stud in England for 150,000 Pounds (2020).

Domestic Spending is trained by Eclipse Award winning trainer Chad C. Brown.

== Statistics ==
Date	Distance	Race	Grade	Track	Odds	Field	Finish	Winning Time	Winning (Losing) Margin	Jockey	Ref
2020 – three-year-old season
Feb 12, 2020	1 mile	Maiden Special Weight		Tampa Bay Downs	1.00*	10	1	1:36.47	3/4 length	Antonio Gallardo	
Jun 7, 2020	1 mile	Allowance		Belmont Park	1.50*	7	1	1:35.81	neck	Irad Ortiz Jr.	
Jul 18, 2020	1 1/8 miles	National Museum of Racing; Hall of Fame Stakes	II	Saratoga	2.60	5	3	1:49.29	(1 1/4 lengths)	Irad Ortiz Jr.	
Aug 15, 2020	1 3/16 miles	Saratoga Derby		Saratoga	7.20	8	1	1:52.52	head	Irad Ortiz Jr.	
Nov 28, 2020	1 1/8 miles	Hollywood Derby	I	Del Mar	4.20	11	1	1:47.15	head	Irad Ortiz Jr.	
2021 – four-year-old season
May 1, 2021	1 1/8 miles	Turf Classic Stakes	I	Churchill Downs	5.90	9	1 (Note: Domestic Spending and Colonel Liam finished in a Dead heat for first)	1:47.99	dead heat	Flavien Prat	
Jun 5, 2021	1 1/4 miles	Manhattan Stakes	I	Belmont Park	1.50*	10	1	1:59.08	2 3/4 lengths	Flavien Prat	
Aug 14, 2021	1 1/4 miles	Mister D. Stakes	I	Arlington Park	0.40*	8	2	2:03.34	(neck)	Flavien Prat	
2022 – five-year-old season
Nov 5, 2022	1 mile	Breeders' Cup Mile	I	Keeneland	11.03	14	DNF (Note: Did not finish the event)	1:33.96		Flavien Prat	

Legend:
Turf
Notes:
An (*) asterisk after the odds means Domestic Spending was the post-time favorite.

== Pedigree ==
Pedigree of Domestic Spending (GB), bay gelding, 24 February 2017
Sire Kingman (GB) (2011)	Invincible Spirit (IRE) (1997)	Green Desert (1983)	Danzig (1977)
Sire Kingman (GB) (2011)	Invincible Spirit (IRE) (1997)	Green Desert (1983)	Foreign Courier (1979)
Sire Kingman (GB) (2011)	Invincible Spirit (IRE) (1997)	Rafha (GB) (1987)	Kris (GB) (1976)
Sire Kingman (GB) (2011)	Invincible Spirit (IRE) (1997)	Rafha (GB) (1987)	Eljazzi (IRE) (1981)
Sire Kingman (GB) (2011)	Zenda (GB) (1999)	Zamindar (1994)	Gone West (1984)
Sire Kingman (GB) (2011)	Zenda (GB) (1999)	Zamindar (1994)	Zaizafon (1982)
Sire Kingman (GB) (2011)	Zenda (GB) (1999)	Hope (IRE) (1991)	Dancing Brave (1983)
Sire Kingman (GB) (2011)	Zenda (GB) (1999)	Hope (IRE) (1991)	Bahamian (IRE) (1985)
Dam Urban Castle (2011)	Street Cry (IRE) (1998)	Machiavellian (1987)	Mr Prospector (1970)
Dam Urban Castle (2011)	Street Cry (IRE) (1998)	Machiavellian (1987)	Coup De Folie (1982)
Dam Urban Castle (2011)	Street Cry (IRE) (1998)	Helen Street (GB) (1982)	Troy (GB) (1976)
Dam Urban Castle (2011)	Street Cry (IRE) (1998)	Helen Street (GB) (1982)	Waterway (1976)
Dam Urban Castle (2011)	Cloud Castle (GB) (1995)	In The Wings (GB) (1986)	Sadlers Wells (1981)
Dam Urban Castle (2011)	Cloud Castle (GB) (1995)	In The Wings (GB) (1986)	High Hawk (IRE) (1980)
Dam Urban Castle (2011)	Cloud Castle (GB) (1995)	Lucayan Princess (IRE) (1983)	High Line (GB) (1966)
Dam Urban Castle (2011)	Cloud Castle (GB) (1995)	Lucayan Princess (IRE) (1983)	Gay France (FR) (1976) (Family: 7-a)
