= 2011 British Champions Series =

The 2011 British Champions Series represents the country's 35 top flat races.

The first race, the 2000 Guineas, was won by Frankel.
