= Canford Cliffs (horse) =

Irish Thoroughbred racehorse

- Racing silks of the Heffer Syndicate
- Sire: Tagula
- Grandsire: Taufan
- Dam: Mrs Marsh
- Damsire: Marju
- Sex: Stallion
- Foaled: 8 February 2007
- Country: Ireland
- Colour: Bay
- Breeder: S & S Hubbard Rodwell
- Owner: Heffer Syndicate; Michael Tabor; Derick Smith
- Trainer: Richard Hannon Sr.
- Record: 11: 7-2-2
- Earnings: £951,724

Major wins
- Coventry Stakes (2009); Irish 2,000 Guineas (2010); St James's Palace Stakes (2010); Sussex Stakes (2010); Lockinge Stakes (2011); Queen Anne Stakes (2011)

Canford Cliffs (foaled 8 February 2007) is an Irish-bred, British-trained Thoroughbred racehorse who was trained by Richard Hannon Sr. He is a bay stallion by Tagula out of Mrs Marsh and was ridden by Richard Hughes in all his races.

== Racing career ==
=== 2009: Two-year-old season ===
Canford Cliffs started his racing career in a maiden at Newbury and won easily by seven lengths. This performance made him the 11/8 favourite for the Coventry Stakes at Royal Ascot. He was near the front from the start and quickened clear with two furlongs to go. He won easily by six lengths from Xtension. Canford Cliffs then went to France for the Prix Morny. Starting odds on, he could only finish third behind Arcano and Special Duty.

=== 2010: Three-year-old season ===
He started his three-year-old season in the Greenham Stakes and was beaten by his stablemate Dick Turpin. He started at 12/1 in the 2000 Guineas, with champion two-year-old St Nicholas Abbey the even money favourite. After worries that he would not stay the mile, he was held up by jockey Richard Hughes. After pulling hard in the early stages he moved through the field to finish third, with 33/1 outsider Makfi winning. Canford Cliffs then went to Ireland for the Irish 2,000 Guineas. He won the race comfortably by three lengths from Free Judgement. He then went to Royal Ascot for the St James's Palace Stakes. He started the 11/4 joint favourite, with the two horses that had finished ahead of him in the season, Makfi and Dick Turpin, also starting. He was held up near the rear in the race and came through to win by one length from Dick Turpin. In his final start of the season Canford Cliffs took on older horses for the first time in the Sussex Stakes, where he beat Rip Van Winkle by a neck.

=== 2011: Four-year-old season ===
Canford Cliffs reappeared in May 2011 as a four-year-old and comfortably won the Lockinge Stakes by 1¼ lengths from Worthad, in a field that also included Dick Turpin and Twice Over. He then went to Royal Ascot for the third time, this year for the Queen Anne Stakes in a much anticipated clash with Goldikova. He overtook Goldikova in the last 100 yards and ran on to beat her by one length, the field also included Cityscape and Cape Blanco. After Ascot came an even more anticipated race, the Sussex Stakes, where Canford Cliffs was matched against the impressive 2000 Guineas winner and unbeaten Frankel. Dubbed the 'Duel on the Downs' some bookmakers were offering a special matched bet, with both horses at even money, in the weeks leading up to the race. Only four horses started the race with Frankel going off the 8/13 favourite and Canford Cliffs at 7/4. Frankel led from the start, closely followed by Canford Cliffs, then Rio De La Plata and Rajsaman. With about a furlong and a half to go Frankel quickened clear and beat Canford Cliffs, who hung badly left, by five lengths. In the days following the race the Hannons suggested that Canford Cliffs was not at his best.

== Assessment ==
In 2010 Canford Cliffs was officially rated as the joint sixth best horse in the world, with a rating of 127. In 2011 he was ranked the joint fifth best, again with a rating of 127. In 2011 he was ranked the second best miler, with Frankel being the top rated.

== Stud career ==
On 4 August 2011 it was announced that Canford Cliffs would be retired to stud due to a leg injury. He stands at Coolmore Stud Ireland 2012-17 Shuttled to Australia 2012-15 In 2018 standing at Ridgemont Highlands, South Africa.
