= Richard Hannon Jr. =

British racehorse trainer (born 1975)

Richard Hannon
Personal information
- Born: 21 November 1975 (age 50) United Kingdom
- Occupation: Trainer

Horse racing career
- Sport: Horse racing

Major racing wins
- British Classic Race wins as trainer: 2,000 Guineas (2014)

Significant horses
- Night of Thunder, Toormore

Richard Michael Hannon Jr. (born 21 November 1975) is a British racehorse trainer. He is the son of, and former assistant to, four time British flat racing Champion Trainer Richard Hannon Sr. He operates from the 160 capacity Herridge Racing Stables, near Marlborough, Wiltshire, with a smaller yard at Everleigh on the edge of Salisbury Plain. He took over the training operation from his father at the end of 2013.

== Career ==
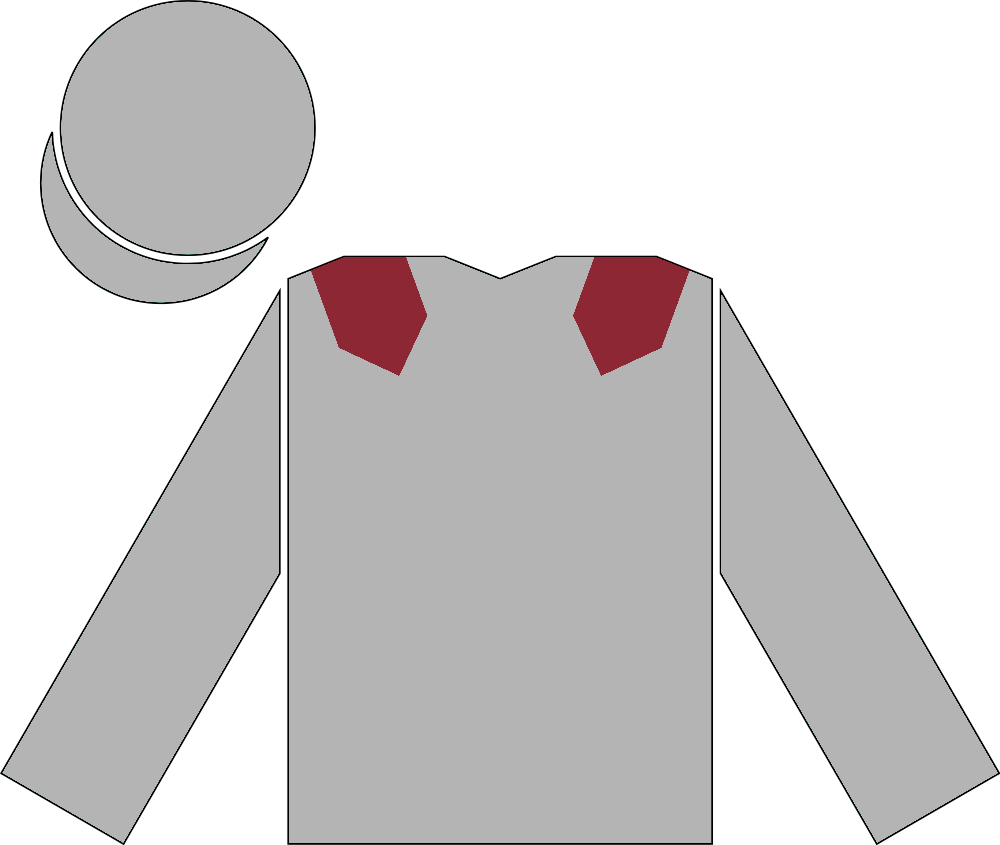
Racing silks of Sheikh Joaan, owner with Richard Hannon

Hannon comes from a family with a long tradition of horse training. Both his father, Richard, and grandfather, Harry, were also trainers. In his younger days, he spent time learning his trade at top stables in Australia, before returning to England to be his father's assistant, just like his father had been his grandfather's assistant before the elder man's retirement in 1970. He served as his father's assistant for twelve years.

During his time as assistant, the yard was highly successful, his father winning three trainers' championships in four years, thanks to the success of horses like 2013 1,000 Guineas winner, Sky Lantern, Sussex Stakes winner, Toronado, and Canford Cliffs, winner of five Group One races before his retirement in 2011. He was instrumental in bringing in new owners to the yard including Sheikh Hamdan, Andrew Tinkler, Sir Robert Ogden, Sir Alex Ferguson and Sheikh Fahad Al Thani. It was announced at the end of November 2013 that he would take over the running of the stable from his father with effect from 1 January 2014.

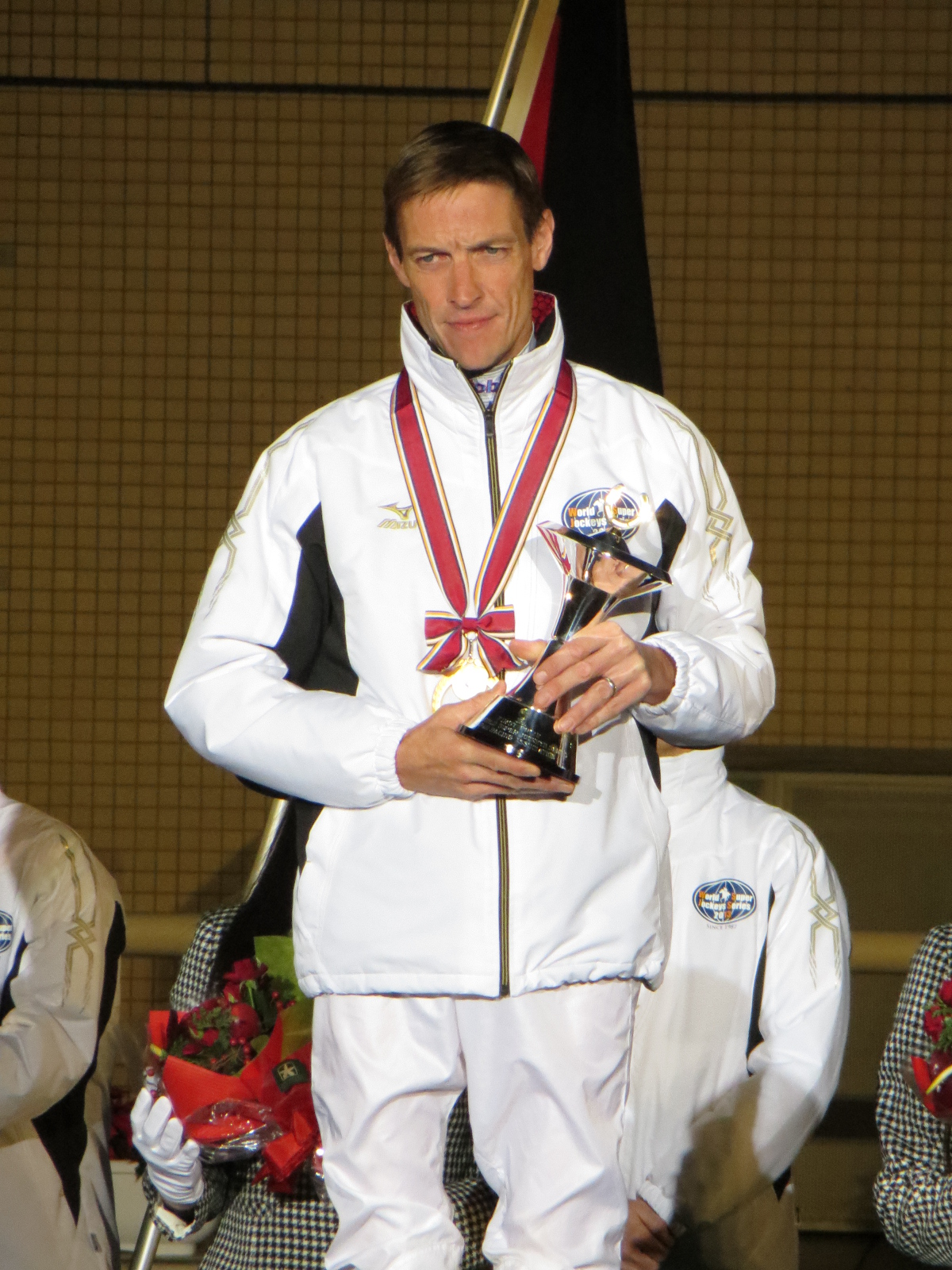
Richard Hughes, former stable jockey

His first runner in his own right was an unraced three-year-old called Unscripted in a seven furlong maiden race at Wolverhampton on 3 January 2014. The horse duly won by 10 lengths as the 2/1 favourite, ridden by Sean Levey.

He currently has 240 horses in training, including Toormore, Toronado, Olympic Glory and Sky Lantern, all of whom won big races for his father. Toormore gave him his first big race victory when winning the Group 3 Craven Stakes at Newmarket and went into the 2014 2,000 Guineas as one of the leading fancies. It was in fact the stable's second string Night of Thunder, ridden by Kieren Fallon, that won the race, despite lurching wildly as the post approached. This gave Hannon his first Classic victory as a trainer in his own right.

Prior to his retirement, Hannon's brother-in-law Richard Hughes was the stable jockey. Hughes is now a trainer himself.

== Personal life ==
Hannon is a triplet, with brother Henry and sister Elizabeth. He also has another three sisters, Claire, Fanny and Julie. Elizabeth is married to trainer Richard Hughes.

He married his second wife, Jemima in 2011. Their first child, Eliza, was born in January 2012, and a son, Jack was born on Christmas Day 2013. He was formerly married to the horse racing presenter Zoey Bird.

== Major wins ==
(United Kingdom) Great Britain

- 1000 Guineas - (1) - Billesdon Brook (2018)
- 2,000 Guineas - Night of Thunder (2014)
- Cheveley Park Stakes - Tiggy Wiggy (2014)
- Coronation Cup - (1) - Pether's Moon (2015)
- Falmouth Stakes - (1) - Snow Lantern (2021)
- Lockinge Stakes - (2) - Olympic Glory (2014), Night of Thunder (2015)
- Queen Anne Stakes - Toronado (2014)
- Queen Elizabeth II Stakes - (1) - King of Change (2019)
- St James's Palace Stakes - (2) - Barney Roy (2017), Rosallion (2024)
- Sun Chariot Stakes - (1) - Billesdon Brook (2019)

France

- Prix de la Forêt - Olympic Glory (2014)
- Prix Jean Romanet - Aristia (2022)
- Prix Jean-Luc Lagardère - Rosallion (2023)

(Republic of Ireland) Ireland

- Irish 2,000 Guineas – (1) – Rosallion (2024)

Italy

- Gran Premio del Jockey Club - Ventura Storm (2016)

== See also ==
- List of significant families in British horse racing
