= Queen Anne Stakes =

Flat horse race in Britain

- Class: Group 1
- Location: Ascot Racecourse; Ascot, Berkshire, England
- Inaugurated: 1840
- Race type: Flat / Thoroughbred
- Website: Ascot

Race information
- Distance: 1 mile (1,609 metres)
- Surface: Turf
- Track: Straight
- Qualification: Four-years-old and up
- Weight: 9 st 2 lb Allowances; 3 lb for fillies and mares 1 lb for S. Hemisphere 4yo
- Purse: £793,625 (2025); 1st: £450,065

Queen Anne Stakes
2026
Ten Bob Tony	More Thunder	Opera Ballo

Previous years
2025
Docklands	Rosallion	Cairo
2024
Charyn	Docklands	Maljoom
2023
Triple Time	Inspiral	Light Infantry
2022
Baaeed	Real World	Order Of Australia
2021
Palace Pier	Lope Y Fernandez	Sir Busker

2020-2011
2020
Circus Maximus	Terebellum	Marie's Diamond
2019
Lord Glitters	Beat The Bank	One Master
2018
Accidental Agent	Lord Glitters	Lightning Spear
2017
Ribchester	Mutakayyef	Deauville
2016
Tepin	Belardo	Lightning Spear
2015
Solow	Esoterique	Cougar Mountain
2014
Toronado	Verrazano	Anodin
2013
Declaration Of War	Aljamaaheer	Gregorian
2012
Frankel	Excelebration	Side Glance
2011
Canford Cliffs	Goldikova	Cityscape

2010-2001
2010
Goldikova	Paco Boy	Dream Eater
2009
Paco Boy	Cesare	Aqlaam
2008
Haradasun	Darjina	Finsceal Beo
2007
Ramonti	Jeremy	Turtle Bowl
2006
Ad Valorem	Court Masterpiece	Proclamation
2005
Valixir	Rakti	Starcraft
2004
Refuse To Bend	Soviet Song	Salselon
2003
Dubai Destination	Right Approach	Where Or When
2002
No Excuse Needed	Tillerman	Tough Speed
2001
Medicean	Swallow Flight	Arkadian Hero

2000-1991
2000
Kalanisi	Dansili	Swallow Flight
1999
Cape Cross	Docksider	Almushtarak
1998
Intikhab	Among Men	Poteen
1997
Allied Forces	Centre Stalls	Ali-Royal
1996
Charnwood Forest	Restructure	Mistle Cat
1995
Nicolotte	Nijo	Soviet Line
1994
Barathea	Emperor Jones	Gabr
1993
Alflora	Inner City	Hazaam
1992
Lahib	Second Set	Sikeston
1991
Sikeston	Rami	Fair Average

1990-1988
1990
Markofdistinction	Mirror Black	Distant Relative
1989
Warning	Reprimand	Sweet Chesne
1988
Waajib	Soviet Star	Then Again

The Queen Anne Stakes is a Group 1 flat horse race in Great Britain open to horses aged four years or older. It is run at Ascot over a distance of 1 mile (1,609 metres), and is scheduled to take place each year in June.

== History ==
The event was established in 1840, and during the early part of its history it was called the Trial Stakes. It was originally open to horses aged three or older. In 1930, it was renamed in honour of Queen Anne, who founded Ascot Racecourse in 1711.

The Queen Anne Stakes was classed as a Group 3 race in 1971, and it was promoted to Group 2 level in 1984. It was given Group 1 status in 2003, and at this point the minimum age of participating horses was raised to four.

It is now the first race on the opening day of the Royal Ascot meeting.

== Records ==
Most successful horse (2 wins):

- Flambeau – 1840, 1841
- Toastmaster – 1885, 1886
- Worcester – 1895, 1896
- Dean Swift – 1906, 1907

Leading jockey (7 wins):

- Frankie Dettori – Markofdistinction (1990), Allied Forces (1997), Intikhab (1998), Dubai Destination (2003), Refuse to Bend (2004), Ramonti (2007), Palace Pier (2021)

Leading trainer (7 wins):

- Saeed bin Suroor – Charnwood Forest (1996), Allied Forces (1997), Intikhab (1998), Cape Cross (1999), Dubai Destination (2003), Refuse to Bend (2004), Ramonti (2007)

Leading owner (8 wins):

- Godolphin – Charnwood Forest (1996), Allied Forces (1997), Intikhab (1998), Cape Cross (1999), Dubai Destination (2003), Refuse to Bend (2004), Ramonti (2007), Ribchester (2017)

== Winners since 1900 ==
Year	Winner	Age	Jockey	Trainer	Owner	Time
1900	Torpedo colt	3	Tommy Loates	John Dawson Jr.	Sir S M Lockhart
1901	Watershed	3	Johnny Reiff	John Huggins	Mr W C Whitney
1902	Rose Blair	3	Walter Bray	Sam Darling	Mr J Gubbins	1:48.60
1903	Littleton	3	Thomas Miller	John Porter	Mr W Low
1904	Grey Plume	3	Jack Jarvis	John Porter	Duke of Westminster
1905	Nabot	6	William Halsey	William Leader	Sir Ernest Cassel
1906	Dean Swift	5	Herbert Randall	Charles Morton	Jack Barnato Joel
1907	Dean Swift	6	Herbert Randall	Charles Morton	Jack Barnato Joel
1908	Llangwm	3	Skeets Martin	Frank Hartigan	Mr A Barclay Walker	1:40.40
1909	St Michan	4	Barry Lynham	Captain Robert Sherwood	John Day
1910	Whisk Broom	3	Skeets Martin	Jack Joyner	Harry Payne Whitney
1911	Hornet's Beauty	3	Skeets Martin	Philip Peebles	Sir W Cooke
1912	Berrilldon	3	Charlie Foy	H Medcalfe	Mr Barton
1913	Lomond	4	Frank Wootton	Richard Wootton	Mr E Hulton	1:39.40
1914	Bridge of Orchy	3	Josiah Prout	George Lambton	Arthur James
1915-18	No race
1919	Ciceronetta	3	Arthur Flanagan	Alec Taylor Jr.	Mr A Cox
1920	Comrade	3	Frank Bullock	Peter Gilpin	M de St Alary
1921	Plymstock	3	Harry Wragg	Alec Taylor Jr.	Lord Astor	1:40.00
1922	Collaborator	3	Charlie Elliott	Jack Jarvis	Sir W Cooke	1:38.80
1923	Friar	3	Tommy Weston	Willie Waugh	Duke of Westminster	1:39.80
1924	Brimstone	3	William McLachlan Jr.	Laing Ward	Mr J White	1:39.80
1925	Sunderland	3	Gordon Richards	Frank Barling	Lord Glanely	1:31.20
1926	Bulger	3	Charlie Smirke	Stanley Wootton	Mrs Cathew	1:48.40
1927	Sundry	3	Gordon Richards	Dawson Waugh	Lord Howard De Walden	1:38.40
1928	Fohanaun	5	Fred Winter Sr.	Walter Earl	Solly Joel	1:43.20
1929	Aristotle	3	Freddie Fox	Fred Darling	Lord Dewar	1:40.40
1930	The Recorder	3	Cliff Richards	Fred Darling	John A Dewar	1:37.00
1931	Coldstream	3	Gordon Richards	Tommy Hogg	Lord Glanely	1:39.60
1932	Unlikely	4	Harry Wragg	Frank Hartigan	Baron F De Tuyll	1:39.00
1933	Madagascar	3	Tommy Bartlam	Richard Dawson	Lord Carnarvon	1:41.60
1934	Spend a Penny	3	Eph Smith	Frank Butters	Sir A Butt	1:39.60
1935	Fair Trial	3	Gordon Richards	Fred Darling	John A Dewar	1:44.00
1936	Hindoo Holiday	4	Doug Smith	Frank Butters	Aga Khan III	1:39.20
1937	Tempest II	4	Bernard Carslake	Vanda Beatty	A K Macomber	1:38.60
1938	St Magnus	5	Richard Perryman	Colledge Leader	Lord Derby	1:38.60
1939	Mac Kann	3	Rae Johnstone	William Cunnington	Robert Lazard	1:39.60
1940-45	No race
1946	Royal Charger	4	Eph Smith	Jack Jarvis	Sir John Jarvis	1:42.20
1947	Woodruffe	3	Cliff Richards	Fred Darling	John A Dewar	1:39.20
1948	Solina	4	Jacques Doyasbere	Pierre Moret	Madame P Thomas-Moret	1:40.40
1949	Pambidian	3	Gordon Richards	Walter Nightingall	C R Harper	1:39.80
1950	Garrick	3	Tommy Burn	William Smyth	Duchess of Norfolk	1:40.60
1951	Neron	3	Derek Greening	Harry Wragg	Aga Khan III	1:39.80
1952	Southborne	5	Gordon Richards	Paddy Prendergast	A L Hawkins	1:39.20
1953	Argur	4	Manny Mercer	John Glynn	Marcel Boussac	1:42.00
1954	Upadee	4	Tommy Burns Sr.	Bernard Gallivan	T McCairns	1:43.40
1955	Golden Planet	3	Doug Smith	Fred Winter Sr.	P Bartholomew	1:43.31
1956	Kandy Sauce	3	Doug Smith	Noel Murless	Sir Victor Sassoon	1:45.43
1957	Baron's Folly	3	Edgar Britt	Rufus Beasley	H Leggat	1:40.64
1958	Teynham	3	Derek Morris	George Colling	R C Boucher	1:41.49
1959	Lucky Guy	3	Joe Sime	Seamus McGrath	J McGrath Jr.	1:43.06
1960	Blast	3	Willie Snaith	Arthur Budgett	R N Richmond-Watson	1:44.18
1961	Amber Light	3	Doug Smith	Fred Winter Sr.	E R Hill	1:47.38
1962	Nereus	3	Peter Robinson	Ken Cundell	P N Robinson	1:46.06
1963	Welsh Rake	8	Ron Hutchinson	Jack Jarvis	J P Philipps	1:51.45
1964	Princelone	3	Russ Maddock	Walter Nightingall	A J Allen	1:48.06
1965	Showdown	4	Doug Smith	Fred Winter Sr.	D Prenn	1:44.00
1966	Tesco Boy	3	Ron Hutchinson	Staff Ingham	J E Cohen	1:42.17
1967	Good Match	3	David East	Jeremy Tree	G Dudley	1:42.60
1968	Virginia Gentleman	3	Sandy Barclay	Doug Smith	J F Lewis III	1:43.24
1969	Town Crier	4	Duncan Keith	Peter Walwyn	Evelyn de Rothschild	1:44.86
1970	Welsh Pageant	4	Sandy Barclay	Noel Murless	Jim Joel	1:39.86
1971	Roi Soleil	4	Ron Hutchinson	Charles Bartholomew	Mrs Douglas Riley-Smith	1:51.94
1972	Sparkler	4	Lester Piggott	Robert Armstrong	Maria Mehl-Mulhens	1:44.11
1973	Sun Prince	4	Joe Mercer	Dick Hern	Michael Sobell	1:41.70
1974	Brook (Note: The first three finishers in 1974, Confusion, Gloss and Royal Prerogative, were all disqualified)	4	Brian Taylor	Mario Benetti	Carlo Vittadini	1:44.17
1975	Imperial March	3	Gianfranco Dettori	Vincent O'Brien	Walter Mullady	1:43.21
1976	Ardoon	6	Brian Taylor	Gavin Pritchard-Gordon	Frank Feeney	1:40.35
1977	Jellaby	4	Brian Taylor	Ryan Price	Esa Alkhalifa	1:45.42
1978	Radetzky	5	Eddie Hide	Clive Brittain	Curtis Elliot	1:41.39
1979	Baptism	3	Lester Piggott	Jeremy Tree	Jock Whitney	1:42.70
1980	Blue Refrain	4	Brian Rouse	John Benstead	Mrs L. Wood	1:45.61
1981	Belmont Bay	4	Lester Piggott	Henry Cecil	Daniel Wildenstein	1:41.74
1982	Mr Fluorocarbon	3	Lester Piggott	Henry Cecil	James McAllister	1:41.04
1983	Valiyar	4	Pat Eddery	Henry Cecil	Garo Vanian	1:42.29
1984	Trojan Fen	3	Lester Piggott	Henry Cecil	Stavros Niarchos	1:40.47
1985	Rousillon	4	Greville Starkey	Guy Harwood	Khalid Abdullah	1:40.27
1986	Pennine Walk	4	Pat Eddery	Jeremy Tree	Maria Niarchos	1:40.80
1987	Then Again	4	Ray Cochrane	Luca Cumani	Richard Shannon	1:44.28
1988	Waajib	5	Michael Roberts	Alec Stewart	Hamdan Al Maktoum	1:47.06
1989	Warning	4	Pat Eddery	Guy Harwood	Khalid Abdullah	1:39.95
1990	Markofdistinction	4	Frankie Dettori	Luca Cumani	Gerald Leigh	1:39.68
1991	Sikeston	5	Michael Roberts	Clive Brittain	Luciano Gaucci	1:41.93
1992	Lahib	4	Willie Carson	John Dunlop	Hamdan Al Maktoum	1:38.64
1993	Alflora	4	Michael Kinane	Clive Brittain	Circlechart Ltd	1:43.16
1994	Barathea	4	Michael Kinane	Luca Cumani	Sheikh Mohammed	1:39.52
1995	Nicolotte	4	Michael Hills	Geoff Wragg	Mollers Racing	1:40.28
1996	Charnwood Forest	4	Michael Kinane	Saeed bin Suroor	Godolphin	1:38.71
1997	Allied Forces	4	Frankie Dettori	Saeed bin Suroor	Godolphin	1:39.72
1998	Intikhab	4	Frankie Dettori	Saeed bin Suroor	Godolphin	1:39.90
1999	Cape Cross	5	Gary Stevens	Saeed bin Suroor	Godolphin	1:39.72
2000	Kalanisi	4	Kieren Fallon	Sir Michael Stoute	HH Aga Khan IV	1:39.68
2001	Medicean	4	Kieren Fallon	Sir Michael Stoute	Cheveley Park Stud	1:40.46
2002	No Excuse Needed	4	Johnny Murtagh	Sir Michael Stoute	Maktoum Al Maktoum	1:40.66
2003	Dubai Destination	4	Frankie Dettori	Saeed bin Suroor	Godolphin	1:38.56
2004	Refuse to Bend	4	Frankie Dettori	Saeed bin Suroor	Godolphin	1:39.14
2005 (Note: The 2005 running took place at York)	Valixir	4	Christophe Soumillon	André Fabre	HH Aga Khan IV	1:36.64
2006	Ad Valorem	4	Kieren Fallon	Aidan O'Brien	Magnier / Ingham	1:40.00
2007	Ramonti	5	Frankie Dettori	Saeed bin Suroor	Godolphin	1:37.21
2008	Haradasun	5	Johnny Murtagh	Aidan O'Brien	Tagg / Magnier et al.	1:38.98
2009	Paco Boy	4	Richard Hughes	Richard Hannon Sr.	Calvera Partnership 2	1:39.31
2010	Goldikova	5	Olivier Peslier	Freddy Head	Wertheimer et Frère	1:37.74
2011	Canford Cliffs	4	Richard Hughes	Richard Hannon Sr.	Heffer / Tabor / Smith	1:38.38
2012	Frankel	4	Tom Queally	Sir Henry Cecil	Khalid Abdullah	1:37.85
2013	Declaration of War	4	Joseph O'Brien	Aidan O'Brien	Magnier / Tabor et al.	1:38.48
2014	Toronado	4	Richard Hughes	Richard Hannon Jr.	Al Shaqab Racing	1:37.73
2015	Solow	5	Maxime Guyon	Freddy Head	Wertheimer et Frère	1:37.97
2016	Tepin	5	Julien Leparoux	Mark Casse	Robert Masterson	1:43.98
2017	Ribchester	4	William Buick	Richard Fahey	Godolphin	1:36.60
2018	Accidental Agent	4	Charlie Bishop	Eve Johnson Houghton	Gaie Johnson Houghton	1:38.85
2019	Lord Glitters	6	Daniel Tudhope	David O'Meara	Geoff & Sandra Turnbull	1:37.40
2020	Circus Maximus	4	Ryan Moore	Aidan O'Brien	Flaxman/Magnier/Tabor/Smith	1:40.05
2021	Palace Pier	4	Frankie Dettori	John & Thady Gosden	Hamdan bin Mohammed Al Maktoum	1:39.18
2022	Baaeed	4	Jim Crowley	William Haggas	Shadwell Estate	1:37.76
2023	Triple Time	4	Neil Callan	Kevin Ryan	Sheikh Mohammed Obaid al Maktoum	1:40.70
2024	Charyn	4	Silvestre de Sousa	Roger Varian	Nurlan Bizakov	1:38.04
2025	Docklands	5	Mark Zahra	Harry Eustace	O T I Racing	1:41.39
2026	Ten Bob Tony	5	Kieran Shoemark	Ed Walker	TBT Racing	1:37.53

== Earlier winners ==
- 1840: Flambeau
- 1841: Flambeau
- 1842: Satirist
- 1843: Poison
- 1844: Corranna
- 1845: The Libel
- 1846: The Conjuror
- 1847: Prussic Acid
- 1848: War Eagle
- 1849: Collingwood
- 1850: Flatcatcher
- 1851: The Moor
- 1852: Officious
- 1853: Ariosto
- 1854: Crosslanes
- 1855: Coroner
- 1856: Spindle
- 1857: The Early Bird
- 1858: Rosabel
- 1859: Sedbury
- 1860: Cock-a-hoop
- 1861: Buccaneer
- 1862: Duke Rollo
- 1863: Tippler
- 1864: Auditor
- 1865: Heir-in-Law
- 1866: Out and Outer
- 1867: Black Diamond
- 1868: filly by Newminster
- 1869: Vagabond
- 1870: Green Riband
- 1871: Sir Hugo
- 1872: Como
- 1873: Moorlands
- 1874: Thunder
- 1875: Conductor
- 1876: Jester
- 1877: Plaisante
- 1878: Post Haste
- 1879: Alchemist
- 1880: Ragman
- 1881: Cradle
- 1882: Valentino
- 1883: Geheimniss
- 1884: Legacy
- 1885: Toastmaster
- 1886: Toastmaster
- 1887: no race
- 1888: Zest
- 1889: Nasr-el-Din
- 1890: True Blue II
- 1891: Caliche
- 1892: Tostig
- 1893: Workington
- 1894: Best Man
- 1895: Worcester
- 1896: Worcester
- 1897: Kilcock
- 1898: Collar
- 1899: Good Luck

== See also ==
- Horse racing in Great Britain
- List of British flat horse races
- Recurring sporting events established in 1840 – this race is included under its original title, Trial Stakes.
