= Richard Hughes (jockey) =

Irish jockey

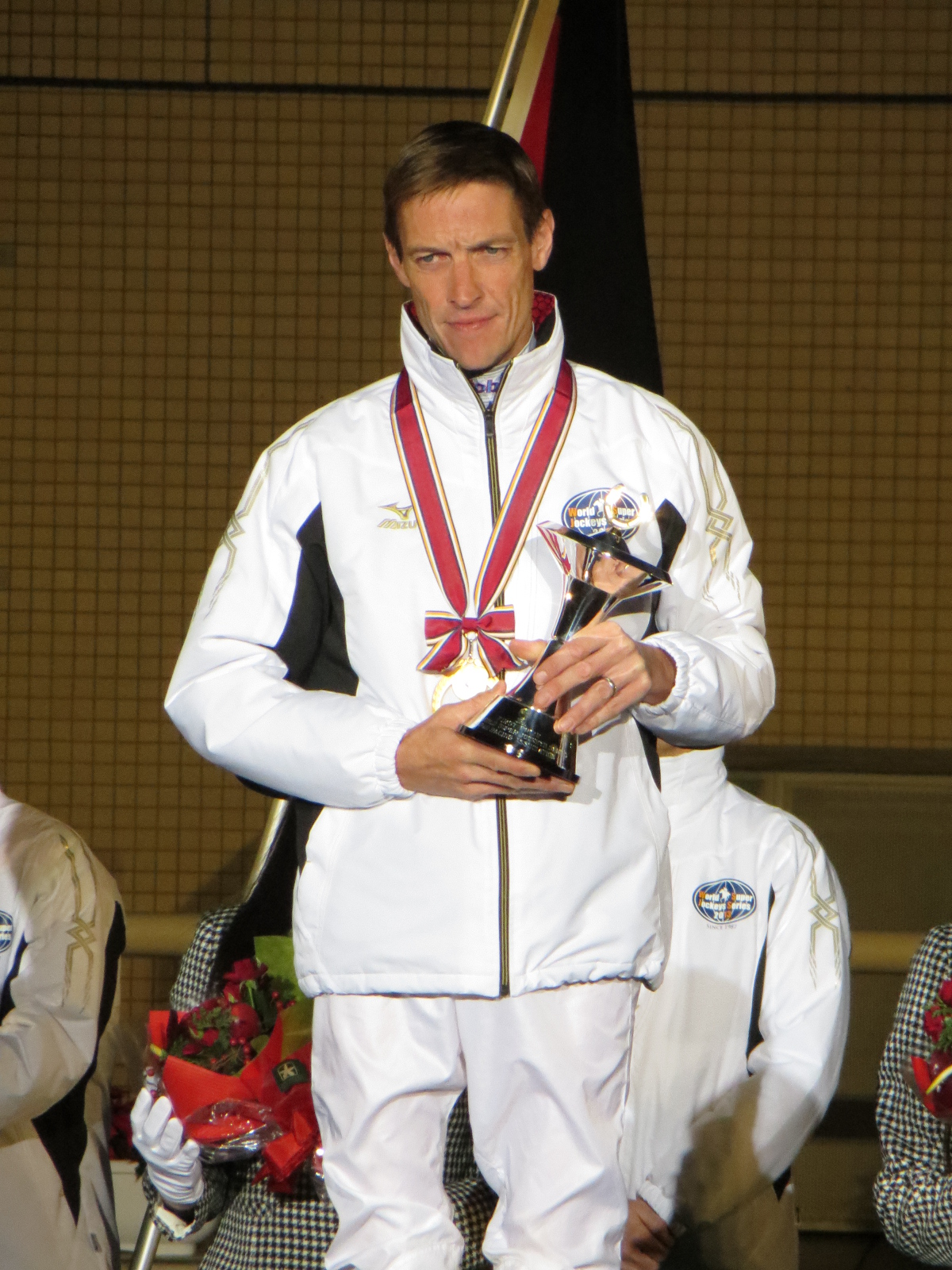
- Richard Hughes (from Hanshin Racecourse)

Personal information
- Born: 11 January 1973 (age 53) Dublin, Ireland
- Occupation: Racehorse trainer

Horse racing career
- Sport: Horse racing
- Career wins: 1828 (as of 31/12/12)

Major racing wins
- UK and Ireland Group 1 Races; 1,000 Guineas, Cheveley Park Stakes, Coronation Stakes, Falmouth Stakes, Haydock Sprint Cup, July Cup, King's Stand Stakes, Lockinge Stakes (twice), Nassau Stakes, Nunthorpe Stakes, Queen Anne Stakes (twice), St. James's Palace Stakes, Sussex Stakes, Irish 2,000 Guineas, Matron Stakes, Epsom Oaks

Racing awards
- British flat racing Champion Jockey 2012, 2013, 2014

Significant horses
- Canford Cliffs, Oasis Dream, Paco Boy, Sky Lantern

1000 Guineas
2013
Sky Lantern	Just The Judge	Moth

Epsom Oaks
2013
Talent	Secret Gesture	The Lark

Richard Hughes (born 11 January 1973) is a retired Irish jockey and current racehorse trainer who is based at Lambourn in Berkshire, England. Born in Dublin, he is the son of successful National Hunt trainer, Dessie Hughes. Hughes became British flat racing Champion Jockey in 2012 and retained that title in 2013, when he rode more than 200 winners in the season, and again in 2014.

== Riding career ==
Hughes started pony racing aged seven, having his first win aboard Chestnut Lady in a six furlong race at Wexford. His first ride in the senior ranks was in a six furlong maiden at Naas on 19 March 1988, on a debutant called Scath Na Greine. He finished tenth.

From 2001 to 2007, Hughes was the retained jockey for owner Prince Khalid Abdullah. For many years up to his retirement on 1 August 2015, his main provider of rides were trainers Richard Hannon Sr. (his own father-in-law) and Richard Hannon Jr. (his brother-in-law), who took over the Hannon stables from his father at the end of 2013.

Hughes is 5'10" in height, very tall for a flat jockey, similar to his contemporary jump jockey Tony McCoy; both men had to maintain their weight significantly below natural levels, even for a jockey. His larger natural size meant he could not ride horses carrying light weights, reducing his winning opportunities. Hughes was respected for his riding style of 'nursing' horses along, getting horses to respond and run into the race without appearing to physically ride them hard.

In October 2011, Hughes received a five-day ban for hitting Swift Blade six times in the final furlong and a few days later got a ten-day ban for hitting More Than Words too many times with the whip inside the final furlong in a race at Kempton. The ban was the first of its kind to be implemented after a change in the rules regarding horse welfare. On 13 October 2011, it was announced that Hughes was giving up his racing licence and quitting the sport out of protest at the ban.

Hughes did not follow up on this threat and on 15 October 2012 he equaled Frankie Dettori's record of winning seven races in a single meeting by winning seven out of eight races at Windsor Racecourse.

The following month, he claimed his first British flat racing Champion Jockey title with 172 winners over the season.

In May 2013, after a long wait, he won his first British Classic on Sky Lantern in the 1,000 Guineas. He then won his second a month later on Talent in the Oaks. On 21 June 2013, he won the Coronation Stakes at Royal Ascot on 1000 Guineas winner Sky Lantern.

At the end of the 2013 British flat racing Hughes was crowned Champion Jockey for the second consecutive season. His total of 208 winners made him the first jockey to ride more than 200 winners in a British flat season since Kieren Fallon in 2003. He retained the title again in 2014, before retiring mid-way through the following season and taking up training.

== Personal life ==
Hughes is married to wife Lizzie and the couple have two sons and a daughter. Outside of racing he enjoys playing a lot of golf.

== British career flat wins ==
- 1994 19
- 1995 68
- 1996 62
- 1997 33
- 1998 55
- 1999 95
- 2000 102
- 2001 91
- 2002 126
- 2003 121
- 2004 73
- 2005 124
- 2006 113
- 2007 139
- 2008 127
- 2009 144
- 2010 192
- 2011 130
- 2012 177
- 2013 208
- 2014 166
- 2015 63

== Major wins as a jockey ==
(United Kingdom) Great Britain

- 1,000 Guineas – (1) – Sky Lantern (2013)
- Cheveley Park Stakes – (2) – Indian Ink (2006), Tiggy Wiggy (2014)
- Coronation Stakes – (2) – Indian Ink (2007), Sky Lantern (2013)
- Epsom Oaks – (1) – Talent (2013)
- Falmouth Stakes – (1) – Music Show (2010)
- Haydock Sprint Cup – (1) – Tante Rose (2004)
- July Cup – (1) – Oasis Dream (2003)
- King's Stand Stakes – (2) – Piccolo (1995), Sole Power (2014)
- Lockinge Stakes – (2) – Paco Boy (2010), Canford Cliffs (2011)
- Nassau Stakes – (1) – The Fugue (2012)
- Nunthorpe Stakes – (2) – Oasis Dream (2003), Sole Power (2014)
- Queen Anne Stakes – (3) – Paco Boy (2009), Canford Cliffs (2011), Toronado (2014)
- Queen Elizabeth II Stakes – (1) – Olympic Glory (2013)
- St James's Palace Stakes – (1) – Canford Cliffs (2010)
- Sussex Stakes – (2) – Canford Cliffs (2010), Toronado (2013)

France

- Critérium de Saint-Cloud – (1) – Passage of Time (2006)
- Grand Prix de Saint-Cloud – (1) – Youmzain (2008)
- Poule d'Essai des Poulains – (1) – American Post (2004)
- Poule d'Essai des Pouliches – (1) – Zenda (2002)
- Prix du Cadran – (1) – Invermark (1998)
- Prix de Diane – (1) – Nebraska Tornado (2003)
- Prix d'Ispahan – (1) – Observatory (2001)
- Prix Jean-Luc Lagardère – (2) – American Post (2003), Olympic Glory (2012)
- Prix Jean Prat – (1) – Dick Turpin (2010)
- Prix du Moulin de Longchamp – (1) – Nebraska Tornado (2003)

India

- Bangalore Derby – (1) – Moonlight Romance (2010 – Summer season)
- Indian 1,000 Guineas – (1) – Jacqueline (2009)
- Indian 2,000 Guineas – (4) – Smart Chieftain (1999), Autonomy (2008), Jacqueline (2009), Ocean And Beyond (2010), Pronto Pronto (2011)
- Indian Derby – (2) – Smart Chieftain (2000), Jacqueline (2010)
- Indian Oaks – (2) – Jacqueline (2010), Moonlight Romance (2011)

(Republic of Ireland) Ireland

- Goffs Million – (2) – Soul City (2008), Lucky General (2009)
- Irish Champion Hurdle – (1) – Cockney Lad (1997)
- Irish 2,000 Guineas – (1) – Canford Cliffs (2010)
- Matron Stakes – (1) – Tadwiga (1998)
- Moyglare Stud Stakes – (1) – Sky Lantern (2012)
- Paddy Power Future Champions Novice Hurdle - (1) His Song (1997)

Italy

- Derby Italiano – (1) – Bahamian Knight (1996)
- Gran Premio d'Italia – (1) – Posidonas (1995)
- Premio Vittorio di Capua – (1) – Mistle Cat (1996)

United Arab Emirates

- Al Quoz Sprint – (1) - Sole Power (2015)

United States

- Breeders' Cup Juvenile Fillies Turf – (1) – Chriselliam (2013)

== Major wins as a trainer ==
(United Kingdom) Great Britain

- July Cup – (1) – No Half Measures (2025)

== See also ==
- List of jockeys
