= Richard Hannon Sr. =

British horse trainer

Richard Hannon
Personal information
- Born: 30 May 1945 (age 81) United Kingdom
- Occupation: Trainer

Horse racing career
- Sport: Horse racing
- Career wins: 4,145

Major racing wins
- British Classic Race wins as trainer: 1,000 Guineas (2); 2,000 Guineas (3); Irish Classic Race wins as trainer: Irish 2,000 Guineas (3)

Racing awards
- British flat racing Champion Trainer (1992, 2010, 2011, 2013)

Significant horses
- Canford Cliffs, Don't Forget Me, Lemon Souffle, Lyric Fantasy, Mon Fils, Mr Brooks, Paco Boy, Tirol, Sky Lantern, Toronado, Olympic Glory

Richard Michael Hannon (born 1945), known as Richard Hannon Sr. to distinguish him from his son, is a former British horse trainer. He was British flat racing Champion Trainer four times, achieved more than a century of victories in a season 20 times, a double century five times, and turned out 32 Royal Ascot winners. He operated out of Herridge Racing Stables, near Marlborough, Wiltshire, with a smaller yard at Everleigh on the edge of Salisbury Plain. He retired after winning a final trainers' championship at the end of 2013, when the training operation was taken over by his son, Richard Hannon Jr.

== History ==
Hannon's family had a tradition of horse training — his father Harry was also a trainer. In fact, Richard started out as his father's assistant and took over Harry's licence when he retired in 1970. His first winner was Ampney Prince at Newbury on 17 April 1970. At that time, there were only a dozen horses in the yard and in the intervening years Hannon's stable grew to 60 horses by 1977, eventually becoming the largest in Britain in terms of number of horses - 270 in 2012. By the time of his retirement he operated from two sites - Herridge and Everleigh.

His reputation was as a specialist with two-year-olds and twice in the 90s he trained the champion juvenile filly - Lyric Fantasy and Lemon Souffle. He has also trained three 2,000 Guineas winners - Mon Fils (1973), Don't Forget Me (1987) and Tirol (1990), the latter two of whom also won the Irish equivalent - and one 1,000 Guineas with Sky Lantern (2013). His best known horse, however, was Canford Cliffs winner of five Group One races before his retirement in 2011.

When he first started out, most of Hannon's horses, including the Classic winning Mon Fils, were ridden by Frankie Durr, who had also ridden for his father. After that initial Classic success though, it was to be another five years before Hannon landed another big race - the 1982 Ebor Handicap with Another Sam.

Towards the end of his career, his son-in-law Richard Hughes was the stable jockey.

In later years, his son Richard was the assistant trainer, Hannon announced in November 2013 that he would retire at the end of the year, at which point Richard Jr. took over the trainer's licence.

He was champion trainer in Britain for a fourth time in 2013 with 235 winners, a record total, and retired having saddled the winners of 4,193 races in Britain and overseas in a training career spanning forty-three years. His total of winners was a record for a British-based trainer until overtaken by Mark Johnston in August 2018.

== Significant owners ==
Hannon trained horses for the Queen.

His son Richard was instrumental in bringing in new owners including Sheikh Hamdan, Andrew Tinkler, Sir Robert Ogden, Sir Alex Ferguson and Sheikh Fahad Al Thani.

== Awards and honours ==
Hannon was honoured as champion trainer in 1992, 2010 and 2011. Richard was awarded The Cartier/Daily Telegraph Award of Merit in 2010 for his lifetime contribution to European racing. he won night of thunder in 2000 guineas in 2014, British flat racing champion trainer and he added more success with billesdon brook with 1000 guineas.

== Personal life ==
Hannon was briefly the drummer for 60s rock group The Troggs before they became famous.

He is married to Josephine and has six children - Claire, Fanny, Julie and triplets Henry, Richard Jr. and Elizabeth (who is married to Richard Hughes).

== Major wins ==
(United Kingdom) Great Britain

- 1,000 Guineas - (1) - Sky Lantern (2013)
- 2,000 Guineas – (3) – Mon Fils (1973), Don't Forget Me (1987), Tirol (1990)
- Challow Novices' Hurdle - (1) - Lift and Load (1992)
- Cheveley Park Stakes – (1) – Indian Ink (2006)
- Christmas Hurdle - (1) - Gran Alba (1991)
- Cork and Orrery Stakes – (2) – Shalford (1992), Bold Edge (1999)
- Coronation Stakes – (2) – Indian Ink (2007), Sky Lantern (2013)
- Falmouth Stakes – (4) – Only Yours (1991), Niche (1993), Lemon Souffle (1994), Caramba (1995)
- July Cup – (1) – Mr Brooks (1992)
- Lockinge Stakes – (3) – Swing Low (1993), Paco Boy (2010), Canford Cliffs (2011)
- Nassau Stakes – (2) – Crespinall (1972), Caramba (1995)
- Nunthorpe Stakes – (1) – Lyric Fantasy (1992)
- Queen Anne Stakes – (2) – Paco Boy (2009), Canford Cliffs (2011)
- Queen Elizabeth II Stakes - (1) - Olympic Glory (2013)
- St. James's Palace Stakes – (1) – Canford Cliffs (2010)
- Sussex Stakes – (3) – Reel Buddy (2003), Canford Cliffs (2010), Toronado (2013)
- Tolworth Novices' Hurdle - (1) - Right Win (1996)

France

- Prix de l'Abbaye de Longchamp – (1) – Mr Brooks (1992)
- Prix du Cadran – (1) – Assessor (1993)
- Prix de la Forêt – (1) – Paco Boy (2008)
- Prix Jean Prat – (2) – Dick Turpin (2010), Havana Gold (2013)
- Prix Maurice de Gheest – (1) – Bold Edge (2000)
- Prix Royal-Oak – (1) – Assessor (1992)

(Republic of Ireland) Ireland

- Irish 2,000 Guineas – (3) – Don't Forget Me (1987), Tirol (1990), Canford Cliffs (2010)
- Matron Stakes – (1) – Tadwiga (1998)
- Moyglare Stud Stakes – (2) – Lemon Souffle (1993), Sky Lantern (2012)
- Phoenix Stakes – (1) – Pips Pride (1992)
- National Stakes - (1) - Toormore (2013)

Italy

- Gran Criterium – (2) – Scintillo (2007), Law Enforcement (2012)
- Gran Premio d'Italia – (1) – Right Win (1993)
- Premio Vittorio di Capua - (1) - Dick Turpin (2011)

== See also ==
- List of significant families in British horse racing

== Bibliography ==
- Mortimer, Roger; Onslow, Richard; Willett, Peter (1978). Biographical Encyclopaedia of British Racing. London: Macdonald and Jane's. ISBN 0-354-08536-0.
- Wright, Howard (1986). The Encyclopaedia of Flat Racing. London: Robert Hale. ISBN 0-7090-2639-0.
