= Yasin Pilavcılar =

Turkish jockey

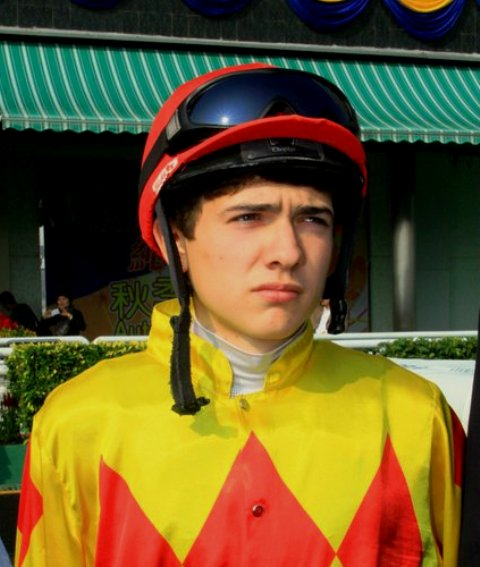
- Pilavcılar at Macau Apprentice Jockeys' Challenge; Taipa Racecourse 2010

Personal information
- Born: 11 September 1990 (age 35) Turkey; Istanbul, Turkey
- Occupation: Jockey

Horse racing career
- Sport: Horse racing
- Career wins: 101+(ongoing)

Major racing wins
- Liberation of Istanbul Stakes (2012)

Significant horses
- Tampico; Altınipek; Sedd El Bahr; Excellent Rock; Aydemirbey

Yasin Pilavcılar (born September 11, 1990 in Istanbul, Turkey) is a horse racing jockey, who is currently riding at Veliefendi Race Course in Istanbul, Turkey.

Pilavcılar commenced his apprenticeship training at Veliefendi Race Course in 2005. After successfully completing a two-year training at Jockey Club of Turkey Ekrem Kurt Apprentice Jockey Training Center, he was entitled to an apprentice jockey licence in 2007.

He had been training since the last period, began working at the Atman Stablemate, and the same time he was an apprentice to the Turkish master jockey Halis Karataş. He met the same period by making a deal with racehorse owner Ethem Murat Kesebir and began to train his horses. After getting a license, for two years only he trained the racehorse at workouts in Istanbul. In that period, he developed the riding techniques and horse-jockey communications. When he felt ready to fully commit himself, he commenced to ride the races, and in a short time, he managed to attract the attention and won the trust of the racing community.

== Riding career ==
He won his first race on July 24, 2009, at Veliefendi Race Course with the racehorse Tampico owned by the Meral Atman, in the eighth race of his life rides. In the same year, he finished second, third and fourth place, with horses belonging to Stablemate in his first run at race life.

For the Jockey Club of Turkey in 2010, he was sent to Macau Apprentice Jockeys Invitation Races (MAJIR 2010) held by Macau Jockey Club. The race took place with the participation of elite apprentice jockeys from 14 different countries. Pilavcılar represented Jockey Club of Turkey in the best way with the successful 4th place he obtained, which was his first international racing experience. Yet in the very beginning of his career, Pilavcılar, during an interview in 2011, he said he wanted to be an international horse racing jockey and to win races in various countries around the world.

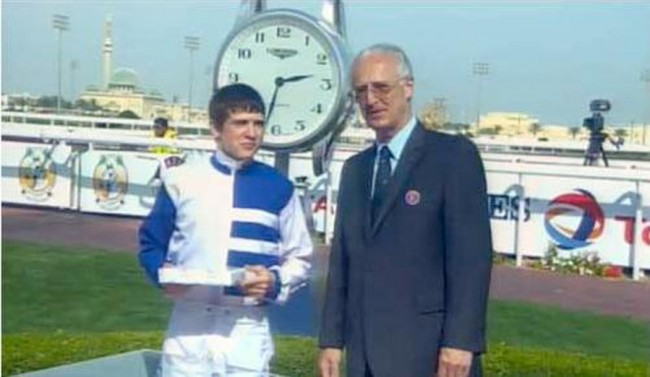
Yasin Pilavcılar & Louis Romanet Qatar 2013

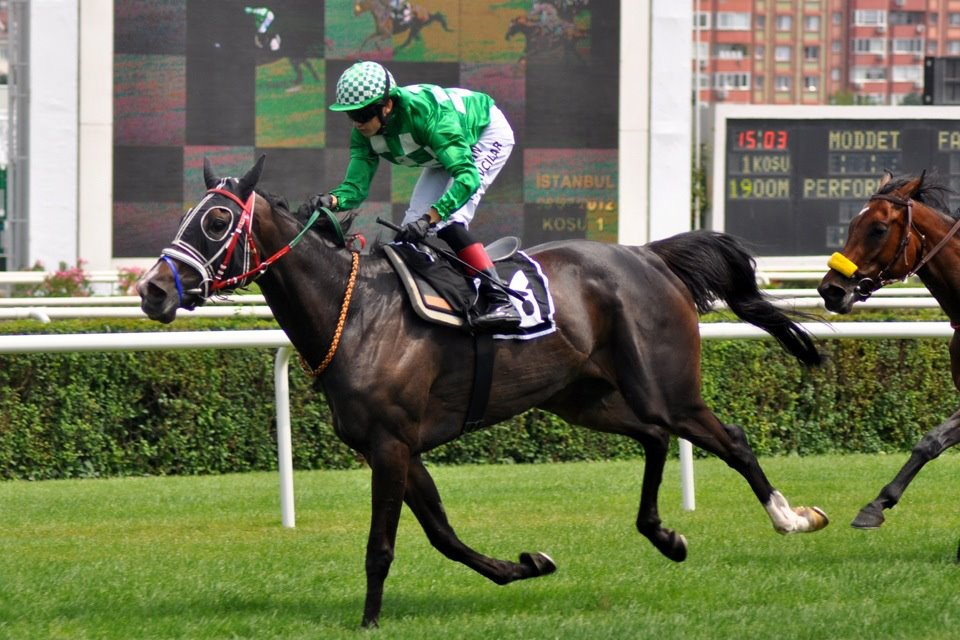
Yasin Pilavcılar & Excellent Rock at Veliefendi Race Course 2012

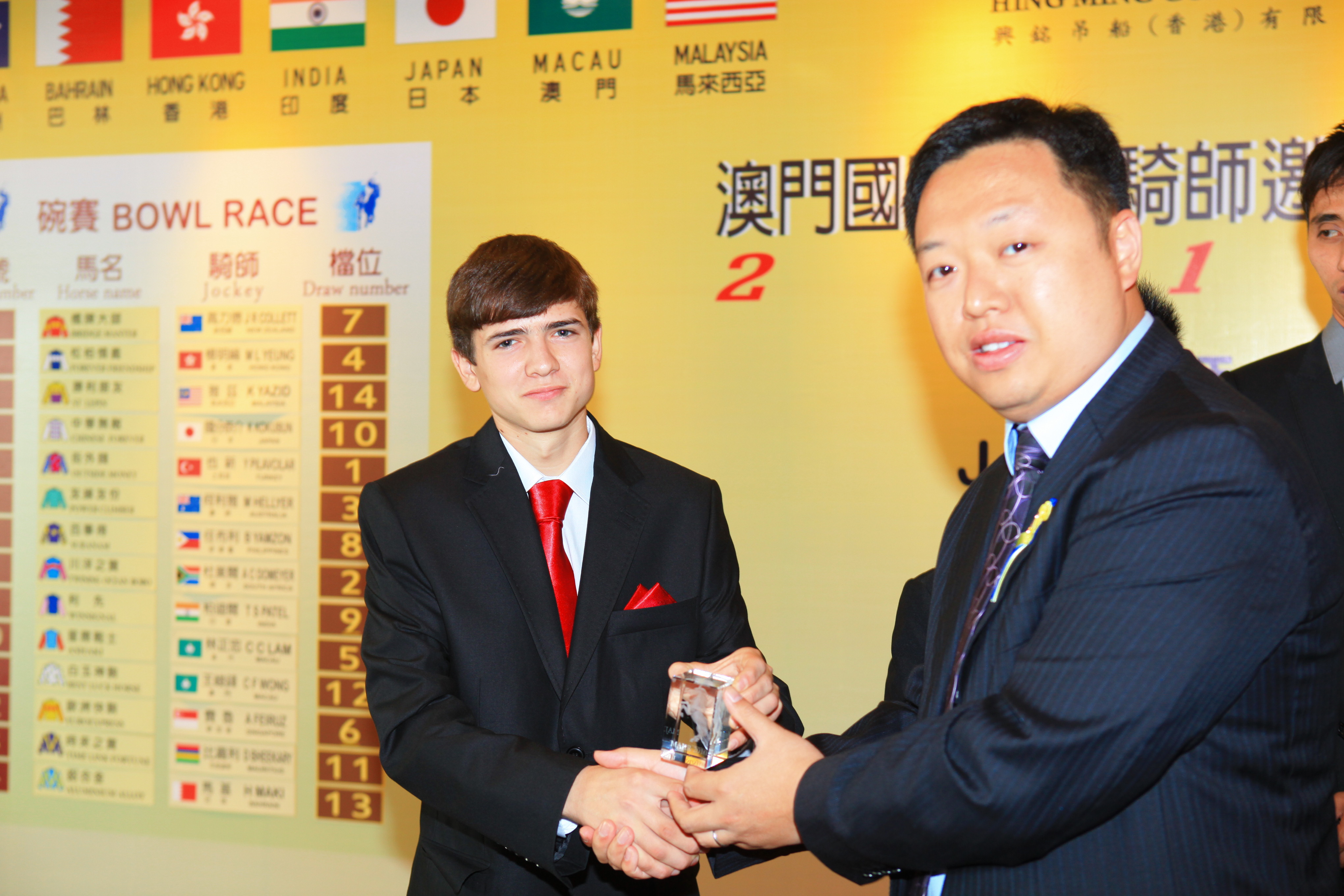
Yasin Pilavcılar and Mr.Thomas Li Macau 2010

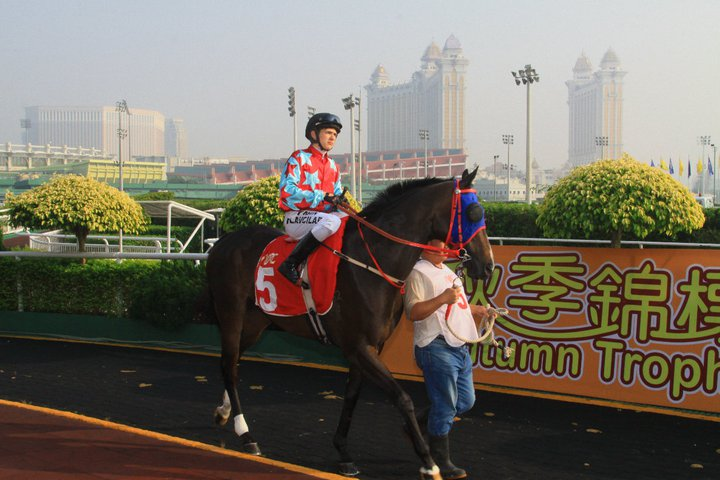
Yasin Pilavcılar and Outside Money at Taipa Racecourse Macau 2010

Looking at his statistics, the most rides and gains were the races at Istanbul Veliefendi Race Course. With the success achieved in 2012, he reached first place in the list of apprentice jockeys and managed to stay on top throughout the 2012 racing season in Istanbul. He also won the Istanbul'un Kurtuluşu Koşusu (The Liberation of Istanbul Stakes) with racehorse Altınipek. In this season, he obtained his first career major victory.

He went to Qatar for represent to Jockey Club of Turkey at international tournament in February 2013. Qatar Apprentice Jockeys' Invitation Races (QAJIR) was held at Qatar Al Rayyan Racecourse, with the participation of jockeys from 12 different countries. He rode three different horses in three international races determined or chosen by lot in three days. He had third on the first race day with racehorse Perigueux(GB). He was unable to obtain any degrees with the other horses.

On July 4, 2013, he won his 100th win with racehorse Blue Darkblue and has been a professional jockey. Also on July 7, 2013 at Istanbul Veliefendi Race Course, he achieved the first win of his jockey career with racehorse Sarrabe.

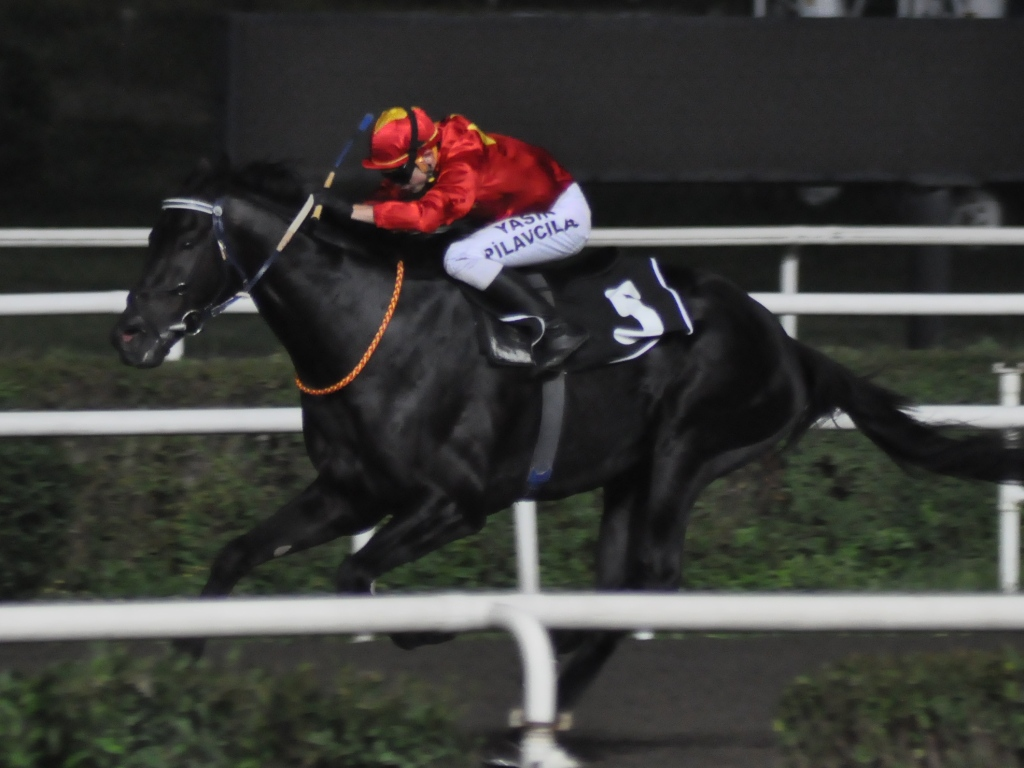
Yasin Pilavcılar & Yunus Efe at Veliefendi Race Course Night Races 2011

== Major wins ==
Turkey

- Liberation of Istanbul Stakes – (1) – Altınipek(2012)
- Fikret Kesebir Stakes – (3) – Boom Boom(2012)
- Urla Stakes – (3) – Santo Domingo(2012)
- Seren 1 Stakes - (2) - Aydemirbey (2013)

Macau

- Macau Apprentice Jockeys’ Invitation Race Cup – (4) – Flaming Sword (2010)

Qatar

- Qatar Apprentice Jockeys' Invitation Race Cup - (3) - Périgueux (2013)

== See also ==
- List of jockeys
- Jockeys' Guild
- Macau Jockey Club
- Veliefendi Race Course
- Gazi Race
