= 2014 2000 Guineas Stakes =

- 2000 Guineas Stakes
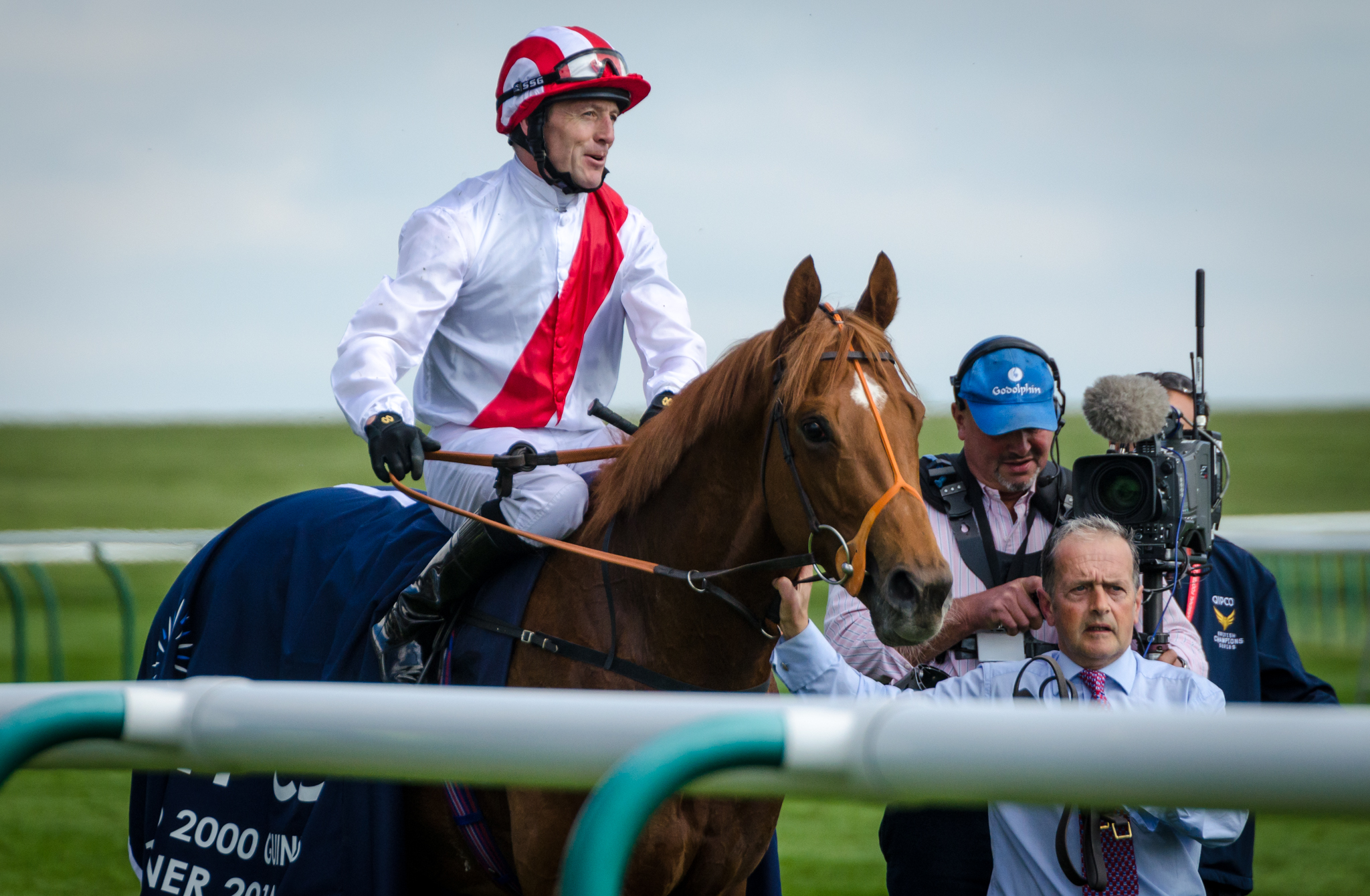
- Night of Thunder after winning the race
- Location: Newmarket Racecourse
- Date: 3 May 2014
- Winning horse: Night of Thunder
- Starting price: 40/1
- Jockey: Kieren Fallon
- Trainer: Richard Hannon Jr.
- Owner: Saeed Manana
- Conditions: Good to firm

The 2014 2000 Guineas Stakes was the 206th running of the 2000 Guineas Stakes horse race. It was run over one mile at Newmarket Racecourse on 3 May 2014. The form of the 2014 running of the 2000 Guineas Stakes was of the strongest seen in years, as can be seen from below.

== Race details ==
- Sponsor: QIPCO
- Winner's prize money: £255,195
- Going: Good to firm
- Number of runners: 14
- Winner's time: 1 minute, 36.61 seconds

== Full result ==
| | Dist * | Horse | Jockey | Trainer | SP |
| 1 | | Night of Thunder | Kieren Fallon | Richard Hannon Jr. | 40/1 |
| 2 | ½ | Kingman | James Doyle | John Gosden | 6/4 fav |
| 3 | hd | Australia | Joseph O'Brien | Aidan O'Brien | 5/2 |
| 4 | 2¼ | Shifting Power | Frankie Dettori | Richard Hannon Jr. | 50/1 |
| 5 | ¾ | Charm Spirit | Olivier Peslier | Freddy Head | 33/1 |
| 6 | ½ | Noozhoh Canarias | Christophe Soumillon | André Fabre | 22/1 |
| 7 | shd | Toormore | Richard Hughes | Richard Hannon Jr. | 15/2 |
| 8 | ¾ | Kingston Hill | Andrea Atzeni | Roger Varian | 10/1 |
| 9 | hd | War Command | Ryan Moore | Aidan O'Brien | 8/1 |
| 10 | ¾ | The Grey Gatsby | Jamie Spencer | Kevin Ryan | 66/1 |
| 11 | ¾ | Bookrunner | Christophe Lemaire | Mikel Delzangles | 33/1 |
| 12 | 11 | Master The World | Liam Keniry | David Elsworth | 100/1 |
| 13 | ¾ | Ertijaal | Paul Hanagan | William Haggas | 33/1 |
| 14 | 1¼ | Outstrip | Mickael Barzalona | Charlie Appleby | 25/1 |

* The distances between the horses are shown in lengths or shorter – nk = neck

== Winner details ==
Further details of the winner, Night of Thunder:

- Foaled: 12 March 2011, in Ireland
- Sire: Dubawi; Dam: Forest Storm (Galileo)
- Owner: Saeed Manana
- Breeder: Frank Dunne

== Form of race ==
The 206th running of the 2000 Guineas Stakes has claim to the strongest 2000 Guineas field in history, in terms of quality in depth. In surpasses the 2008 running, which included the first two home in that seasons Breeders' Cup Classic and Group 1 winners: Henrythenavigator (2000 Guineas Stakes, Irish 2,000 Guineas, St James's Palace Stakes, Sussex Stakes), New Approach (National Stakes, Dewhurst Stakes, Epsom Derby, Irish Champion Stakes, Champion Stakes), Raven's Pass (Queen Elizabeth II Stakes, Breeders' Cup Classic) and Ibn Khaldun (Racing Post Trophy). It can also be argued that the quality of the edition, surpasses that of the acclaimed 1971 running with included Brigadier Gerard, Mill Reef and My Swallow; between the three they won every major juvenile race in Europe, whilst Brigadier Gerard and Mill reef have claim to being the best European horse of the 20th Century.

As can be seen from below, an astonishing nine of the fourteen horses in the 2014 running, were Group One winners, while two of the other five were dual Group One placed. The strength in depth of the field was exemplified on British Champions Day 2014, in Europe's richest mile race: the Queen Elizabeth II Stakes. First, second and third all ran in the 2014 2000 Guineas: 1st – Charm Spirit (5th in 2000 Guineas); 2nd – Night of Thunder (1st in 2000 Guineas); 3rd – Toormore (7th in 2000 Guineas). On Racing Post Ratings, accounting all 14 horses, the 2014 edition had an average rating of 119 lbs at the end of the 2014 flat season.

=== 1st Night of Thunder ===
- 1st 2000 Guineas Stakes – G1
- 1st Lockinge Stakes – G1
- 1st Doncaster Stakes – Listed
- 2nd Queen Elizabeth II Stakes – G1
- 2nd St James's Palace Stakes – G1
- 2nd Greenham Stakes – G3
- 3rd Prix du Moulin de Longchamp – G1

=== 2nd Kingman ===
- 1st Irish 2,000 Guineas – G1
- 1st St James's Palace Stakes – G1
- 1st Sussex Stakes – G1
- 1st Prix Jacques Le Marois – G1
- 1st Greenham Stakes – G3
- 1st Solario Stakes – G3
- 2nd 2000 Guineas Stakes – G1

=== 3rd Australia ===
- 1st Epsom Derby – G1
- 1st Irish Derby – G1
- 1st International Stakes – G1
- 1st Breeders' Cup Juvenile Turf Trial Stakes – G3
- 2nd Irish Champion Stakes – G1
- 3rd 2000 Guineas Stakes – G1

=== 4th Shifting Power ===
- 1st European Free Handicap – Listed
- 1st Royal Windsor Stakes – Listed
- 2nd Irish 2,000 Guineas – G1
- 2nd Prix Jean Prat – G1 (promoted from 3rd)
- 3rd Sandown Mile – G2

=== 5th Charm Spirit ===
- 1st Queen Elizabeth II Stakes – G1
- 1st Prix Jean Prat – G1
- 1st Prix du Moulin de Longchamp – G1
- 1st Prix Djebel – G3
- 1st Prix Paul de Moussac – G3
- 3rd Prix Jean-Luc Lagardère – G1

=== 6th Noozhoh Canarias ===
- 1st Criterium Du Béquet – Listed
- 2nd Prix Jean-Luc Lagardère – G1
- 3rd Prix de la Forêt – G1
- 3rd Prix de la Porte Maillot – G3
- 3rd Prix Servanne – Listed

Spain:

- 1st Gran Premio Claudio Carudel – Category A
- 1st Premio Martorell – Category B
- 1st Premio Andrés Covarrubias – Category B
- 1st Premio Nertal – Category B
- 1st Premio Paso – Category C
- 1st Premio Torre Arias – Category C

=== 7th Toormore ===
- 1st Vincent O'Brien Stakes – G1
- 1st Vintage Stakes – G2
- 1st Lennox Stakes – G2
- 1st International Topkapi Trophy – G2
- 1st Sandown Mile – G2
- 1st Craven Stakes – G3
- 2nd Lockinge Stakes – G1
- 2nd Lennox Stakes – G2
- 3rd Queen Elizabeth II Stakes – G1
- 3rd Prix de la Forêt – G1
- 3rd International Topkapi Trophy – G2

=== 8th Kingston Hill ===
- 1st St. Leger Stakes – G1
- 1st Racing Post Trophy – G1
- 1st Autumn Stakes – G3
- 2nd Epsom Derby – G1

Fourth in Eclipse Stakes and Prix de l'Arc de Triomphe

=== 9th War Command ===
- 1st Dewhurst Stakes – G1
- 1st Coventry Stakes – G2
- 1st Futurity Stakes – G2
- 3rd Phoenix Stakes – G1

=== 10th The Grey Gatsby ===
- 1st Prix du Jockey Club (French Derby) – G1
- 1st Irish Champion Stakes – G1
- 1st Dante Stakes – G2
- 2nd International Stakes – G1
- 2nd Dubai Turf – G1
- 2nd Prince of Wales's Stakes – G1
- 2nd Eclipse Stakes – G1
- 2nd Champagne Stakes – G2
- 2nd Princess of Wales's Stakes – G2
- 2nd Craven Stakes – G3
- 2nd Acomb Stakes – G3
- 3rd International Stakes – G1

=== 11th Bookrunner ===
- 2nd Premio Vittorio di Capua – G1
- 3rd Prix Messidor – G3

=== 12th Master The World ===
- 1st Winter Derby – G3
- 1st Churchill Stakes – L (twice)
- 2nd Sovereign Stakes – G3
- 2nd Wild Flower Stakes – L
- 3rd Churchill Stakes – L
- 3rd James Seymor Stakes – L

=== 13th Ertijaal ===
- 1st Meydan Sprint – G2
- 1st Meydan Sprint – G3
- 1st Lingfield Spring Cup – Listed
- 1st HH President Cup – Listed
- 2nd Al Quoz Sprint – G1
- 3rd Al Quoz Sprint – G1
- 3rd Queensferry Stakes – Listed

=== 14th Outstrip ===
- 1st Breeders' Cup Juvenile Turf – G1
- 1st Champagne Stakes – G2
- 2nd Vintage Stakes – G2
- 3rd St James's Palace Stakes – G1
- 3rd Dewhurst Stakes – G1

== Subsequent breeding careers ==
Leading progeny of participants in the 2014 2000 Guineas Stakes.

=== Sires of Classic winners ===
Kingman (2nd)

- Persian King – 1st Poule d'Essai des Poulains (2019)
- King Of Comedy – 2nd St James's Palace Stakes (2019)
- Calyx – 1st Coventry Stakes (2018)
- Headman – 1st Prix Eugène Adam (2019)
- Palace Pier – 1st St James's Palace Stakes (2020)

Australia (3rd)

- Galileo Chrome – 1st St Leger Stakes (2020)
- Sir Ron Priestley (2nd St Leger Stakes 2019)
- Cayenne Pepper (2nd Irish Oaks 2020)
- Beyond Reason (1st Prix du Calvados 2018)
- Leo De Fury (1st Mooresbridge Stakes 2020)

=== Other stallions ===
Night Of Thunder (1st) – Thunderous (1st Dante Stakes 2020), Auyantepui (1st Oaks d'Italia 2020), Night Colours (1st Premio Dormello 2019)
War Command (9th) – War Breeze (1st Chilean Derby 2020)
Charm Spirit (5th) – Scorpz (3rd New Zealand Derby 2020), Aretha (2nd Manawatu Sires Produce Stakes 2019), Kick On (1st Sovereign Stakes 2019)
Outstrip (14th) – Flippa The Strippa (1st National Stakes 2019)
Kingston Hill (8th) – Minor flat winners
The Grey Gatsby (10th) – Offspring yet to race
Shifting Power (4th) – Exported to India
Noozhoh Canarias (6th) – Standing in Spain
