= Presidential Guard Regiment (Turkey) =

- Cumhurbaşkanlığı Muhafız Alayı
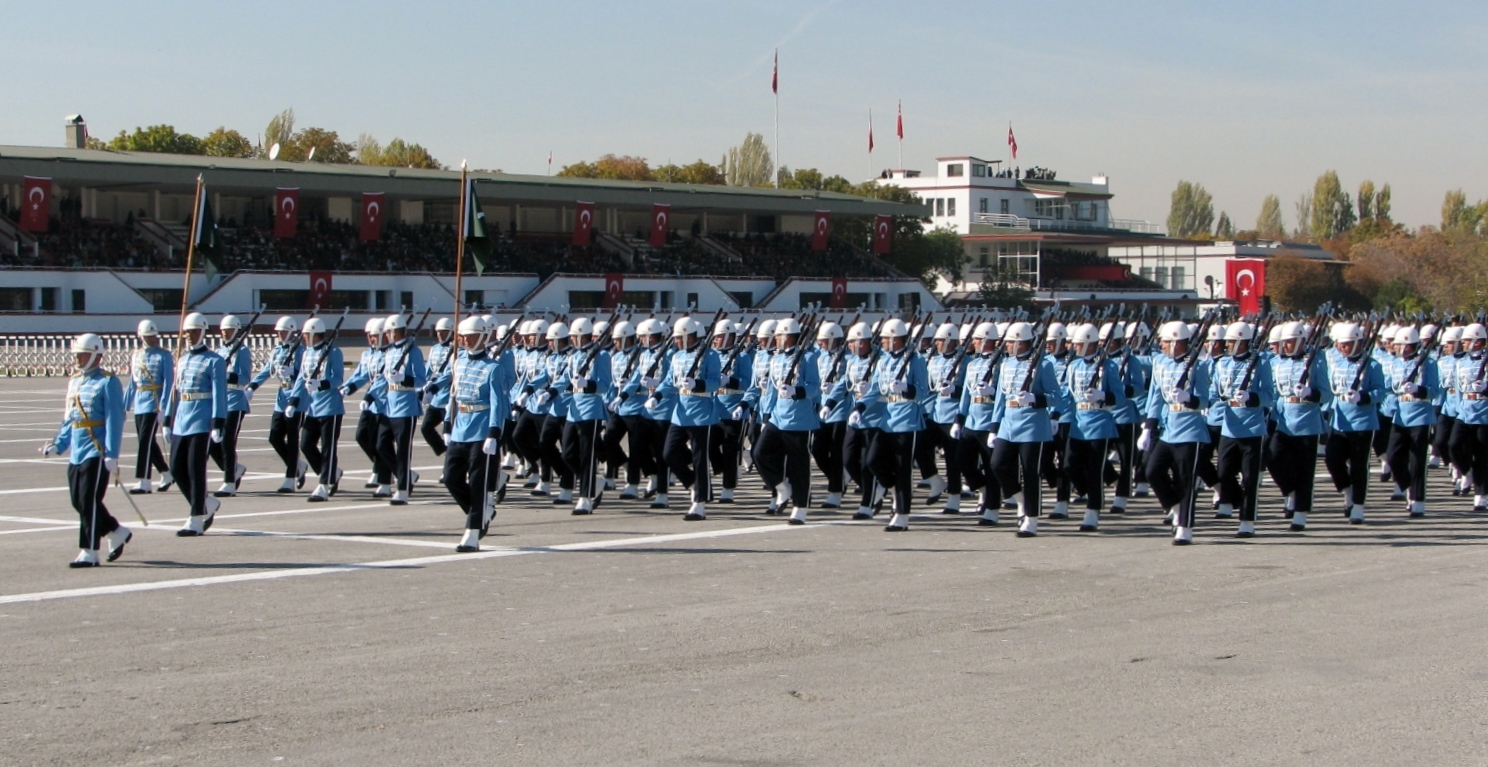
- Active: 18 July 1920 (105 years, 8 months)
- Country: Turkey
- Branch: Turkish Land Forces
- Type: Regiment
- Role: Presidential guard (1920–2016); Honor guard (since 2016)
- Size: 2,500
- Garrison/HQ: Cumhurbaşkanlığı Sarayı

Commanders
- Current commander: Colonel Muhsin Kutsi Barış

The Presidential Guard Regiment (Turkish: Cumhurbaşkanlığı Muhafız Alayı) was a military unit of the Turkish Armed Forces stationed in Çankaya Köşkü, the official residence of the Prime Minister of Turkey (office abolished in 2018) and until 2014 the official residence of the President of Turkey. The Guard Regiment was the only unit in the Turkish Land Forces to wear turquoise and white ceremonial uniforms.

== History ==
The Turkish Presidential Guard Regiment was established in July 1920 under President Atatürk. Its original role was to provide security in Ankara, in what was then a small and isolated city. As a battalion sized unit it saw active service during the war with Greece.

In 1927 the Guard Battalion, as it was then known, was expanded to 2,500 men and renamed as the Presidential Guards Regiment. During World War II the unit was expanded again and restructured as a brigade and then a division. In 1948 it was reduced to battalion strength and in 1953 merged with the separate Parliamentary Guard Battalion, under its final title of Presidential Guard Regiment.

Primarily visible as a ceremonial and honor guard unit, the regiment included a horse mounted escort. Under President Erdoğan during 2015 the Guard provided small detachments in various historic Ottoman costumes at public functions.

=== 2016 coup ===
Following the abortive coup attempt of 2016, almost 300 members of this unit were arrested. Shortly thereafter, the Turkish government announced that the entire Presidential Guard Regiment was to be disbanded. Though plans for full disbandment were subsequently abandoned, the Presidential Guard was reorganised and its ceremonial responsibility for the protection of the presidential palace was handed over to a special police operations unit.

== Mounted Ceremonial Unit ==
The Mounted Ceremonial Unit (Turkish: Süvari Birliği) was established within the original guard battalion on July 18, 1920, and was restructured as the Presidential Guard Regiment Cavalry Group in 1961. The unit, which was transformed into the Presidential Guard Regiment Mounted Ceremonial Unit in 1969 and renamed the Presidential Mounted Ceremonial Unit in 1975 with the addition of a riding team, was attached to the Army War College Command on October 4, 1984, under the name Mounted Sports Training Center Command. The vast majority of the 130 horses in the unit are of the Gemlik breed native sport horses with geographical registration certificates, produced by the Horse Production and Training Battalion Command of the Military Veterinary School and Training Center Command.

== Commanders ==
#	Name	Term start	Term end
1	Lieutenant Colonel Topal Osman	1920	1923
2	Colonel İsmail Hakkı Tekçe	1920	1940
3	Infantry Major Hüsnü Dumlu	1940	1942
4	Infantry Major Necdet Ergezen	1942	1943
5	Infantry Major Daniş Karabelen	1943	1948
6	Infantry Lieutenant Colonel Gani Güvener	1948	1950
7	Staff Major Nüzhet Bulca	1950	1953
8	Staff Colonel Bahattin Ertürk	1953	1955
9	Staff Colonel Refik Tulga	1955	1956
10	Staff Colonel Bahattin Ertürk	1956	1959
11	Staff Colonel Osman Köksal	1959	1961
12	Staff Colonel Şükrü İlkin	1961	1962
13	Staff Colonel Cihat Alpan	1962	1962
14	Staff Colonel İsmail Hakkı Bayındır	1962	1966
15	Staff Colonel Dündar Baykal	1966	1969
16	Colonel Hadi Öztekin	1969	1971
17	Staff Colonel Yılmaz Tokatlı	1971	1973
18	Staff Colonel Hüseyin Topa	1973	1974
19	Colonel Abdullah Erkun	1974	1976
20	Staff Colonel Hasan Sağlam	1976	1977
21	Colonel Rasim Burakan	1977	1981
22	Staff Colonel Çevik Bir	1981	1983
23	Staff Colonel Halit Edip Başer	1983	1986
24	Staff Colonel Yaşar Büyükanıt	1986	1988
25	Staff Colonel Ersin Yılmaz	1988	1990
26	Staff Colonel Yaşar Karagöz	1990	1991
27	Staff Colonel Hasan Iğsız	1991	1993
28	Staff Colonel Aslan Güner	1993	1994
29	Staff Colonel Nusret Taşdeler	1994	1996
30	Staff Colonel Kerim Şahin	1996	1997
31	Staff Colonel Cihangir Akşit	1997	1999
32	Staff Colonel Tayyar Elmas	1999	2000
33	Staff Colonel Abdullah Recep	2000	2001
34	Staff Colonel Kamil Başoğlu	2001	2002
35	Staff Colonel Ferit Güler	2002	2004
36	Staff Colonel Hamza Koçyiğit	2004	2006
37	Staff Colonel Burhanettin Aktı	2006	2008
38	Staff Colonel Muharrem Metin Özbek	2008	2010
39	Staff Colonel Şener Topuç	2010	2012
40	Staff Colonel İsmail Güneşer	2012	2013
41	Staff Colonel Muhammet Tanju Poshor	2013	2015
42	Staff Colonel Muhsin Kutsi Barış	2015	2016
