= International Bosphorus Cup =

- Class: Group 2
- Location: Veliefendi Race Course; Istanbul, Turkey
- Race type: Flat

Race information
- Distance: 2,400 metres (1½ miles)
- Surface: Turf
- Track: Right-handed
- Qualification: Three-years-old and up, geldings not allowed
- Weight: 56 kg (3yo); 60 kg (4yo+); Allowances; 1½ kg for fillies and mares

The International Bosphorus Cup is a Group 2 flat horse race in Turkey open to horses aged three years or older. It is run at Veliefendi Race Course over a distance of 2,400 metres (about 1½ mile), and it is scheduled to take place each year in early September. It is part of Istanbul's International Racing Festival.

== History ==
The Bosphorus Cup was elevated to international Group 2 level in 2009, though in 2018 it lost that status becoming Local Group 2 and substantially reducing its prizemoney.

== Records since 2000 ==
Most successful horse (2 wins):

- Grand Ekinoks – (2002), (2003)
- Senex – (2004), (2005)
- Indian Days – (2010), (2011)

Leading jockey (3 wins):

- Alan Munro – Halicarnassus (2009), Indian Days (2010), (2011)

Leading trainer (3 wins):

- Hans Blume – Senex (2004), (2005), Bussoni (2007)
- Saeed bin Suroor - Lost in the Moment (2013), Move Up (2016), Secret Number (2017)

== Winners since 2000 ==
Year	Winner	Age	Jockey	Trainer	Time
2000	Caitano	6	Andrasch Starke	Andreas Schutz (GER)	2:30.45
2001	Kings Boy^{[1]}	4	Norman Richter	Andreas Wohler (GER)	2:28.15
2002	Grand Ekinoks	4	Halis Karatas	(TUR)	2:29.06
2003	Grand Ekinoks	5	S Akdi	Alban de Mieulle	2:28.80
2004	Senex	4	William Mongil	Hans Blume (GER)	2:26.47
2005	Senex	5	Andreas Suborics	Hans Blume (GER)	2:30.68
2006	Champs To Champs	3	Selim Kaya	A Dutal (TUR)	2:30.09
2007	Bussoni	6	Andreas Suborics	Hans Blume (GER)	2:31.28
2008	Inspector	4	Halis Karatas	Ümit Bekmezci (TUR)	2:27.35
2009	Halicarnassus	5	Alan Munro	Mick Channon (GB)	2:31.59
2010	Indian Days	5	Alan Munro	James Given (GB)	2:29.07
2011	Indian Days	6	Alan Munro	James Given (GB)	2:26.44
2012	Mitico	4	Selim Kaya	Zulfikar Guneli (TUR)	2:33.37
2013	Lost in the Moment	6	Mickael Barzalona	Saeed bin Suroor (GB)	2:28.87
2014	Pether's Moon	4	Richard Hughes	Richard Hannon Jr. (GB)	2:36.60
2015	Connecticut	4	Adam Kirby	Luca Cumani (GB)	2:29.45
2016	Move Up	3	Mickael Barzalona	Saeed bin Suroor (GB)	2:32.46
2017	Secret Number	7	Gerald Mosse	Saeed bin Suroor (GB)	2:32.41
2018	Finesse	4	Selim Kaya	Yasim Demirkiran	2:28.91
2019	Finesse	5	Selim Kaya	Umit Yayla	2:29.54
2020	Mister Gorkem	5	Ahmet Celik	Mehmet Ocal	2:27.33
2021	Zafer Atesi	7	Ozcan Yildirim	Yasin Demirkiran	2:29.71

^{1} The 2001 winner Kings Boy was later exported to Saudi Arabia and renamed Qaayed Alkhail.

== See also ==
- List of Turkish flat horse races
