= Sabirli (horse) =

Turkish Thoroughbred racehorse

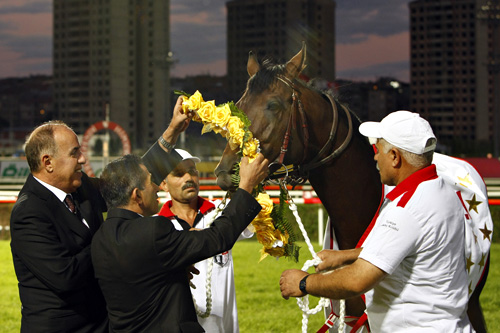
- Sabirli in September 2009
- Sire: Strike the Gold
- Grandsire: Alydar
- Dam: Free Trade
- Damsire: Shareef Dancer
- Sex: Stallion
- Foaled: April 9, 2001
- Died: September 15, 2010 (aged 9)
- Country: Turkey
- Colour: Bay
- Breeder: Aydoğan San
- Owner: Aydoğan San
- Trainer: Cemal Kurt
- Record: 51:26-10-8
- Earnings: more than $2,800,000

Major wins
- Çaldıran Trophy (2003); Fatih Sultan Mehmet Trophy (2004, 2006, 2008); DNRD Cup (2006); International Topkapi Trophy (2007)

Awards
- Turkish Horse of the Year (2007)

Honours
- Turkish Racing Hall of Fame (2009)

Sabirli (in Turkish Sabırlı) (April 9, 2001 – 15 September 2010) was a Turkish racehorse and sire. Sabirli was noted for his toughness on the turf winning twenty-six of his fifty-one races over seven seasons from 2003 to 2009. In 2006 he became one of the few Turkish-trained Thoroughbreds to compete successfully abroad when he won a race in Dubai. In the following season he defeated an international field to win Turkey's most valuable race, the Topkapi Trophy at Veliefendi Race Course in Istanbul. Over his career he won the equivalent of more than $2,800,000.

== Background ==
Sabirli is a bay horse with no white markings bred by Aydoğan San at the Karacabey stud in Bursa. He was sired by the Kentucky Derby winner Strike the Gold who became a leading sire in Turkey after being imported in 1998. His dam was the Turkish-bred mare Free Trade, a daughter of Shareef Dancer. He was trained throughout his racing career by Cemal Kurt and ridden by in most of his races by Halis Karatas. Sabirli is a Turkish word meaning "patient". At the time of his greatest success, Sabirli raced in a hood and wore a red shadow roll.

== Racing ==
Racing as a two-year-old Sabirli won four races, recording his most important success in the Çaldıran Trophy (Turkish Group 1) over one mile at Veliefendi on 1 November. In the following year he won the Fatih Sultan Mehmet Trophy (Turkish Group 1) and three other Turkish Group races, all at Veliefendi over seven furlongs and a mile. He also finished fourth in the Topkapi Trophy an International Group Two race over one mile at Veliefendi. As a four-year-old he won a further five Turkish Group races and distances ranging from six furlongs up to one and a quarter miles.

In early 2006, Sabirli became one of the few Turkish-trained Thoroughbreds to compete internationally when he was sent to race at Nad Al Sheba Racecourse in Dubai. He finished fifth behind the British colt Kandidate on 19 January and won the DNRD Cup, a one-mile handicap race in February, beating horses from the United Arab Emirates, South Africa, Kuwait, Germany and Singapore. On his return to Turkey he won his next four races including a second Fatih Sultan Mehmet Trophy. On 10 September he was made 1/4 favourite for his second attempt at the Topkapi Trophy. Racing on firm ground he finished fourth of the ten runners behind the Irish-bred mare Ribella.

Sabirli won three of his first five races before meeting Ribella again in the Topkapi Trophy. The race carried a much-increased first prize equivalent to £280,000 and attracted challengers from France, Germany and the United Kingdom. Starting at odds of 3.75/1, Sabirli was held up by Karatas in the early stages before making his challenge down the centre of the track in the straight. He took the lead inside the final furlong and won by a length from Ribella and the French-trained Trip to the Moon. Sabirli remained in training for a further two years, winning a third Fatih Sultan Mehmet Trophy in 2008 before being retired to stud.

== Stud ==
Sabirli was retired from racing at the end of the 2009 season and returned to the place of his birth to become a breeding stallion at Karacabey stud. He died on 15 September 2010 in a paddock accident after falling backward and fracturing his neck. He sired 46 named foals before his death.

== Pedigree ==
Pedigree of Sabirli, bay stallion, Turkey, 2001
| Sire Strike the Gold 1988 | Alydar; 1975 | Raise a Native | Native Dancer |
| Sire Strike the Gold 1988 | Alydar; 1975 | Raise a Native | Raise You |
| Sire Strike the Gold 1988 | Alydar; 1975 | Sweet Tooth | On-and-On |
| Sire Strike the Gold 1988 | Alydar; 1975 | Sweet Tooth | Plum Cake |
| Sire Strike the Gold 1988 | Majestic Gold; 1979 | Hatchet Man | The Axe |
| Sire Strike the Gold 1988 | Majestic Gold; 1979 | Hatchet Man | Bebopper |
| Sire Strike the Gold 1988 | Majestic Gold; 1979 | Majestic Secret | Pappa Fourway |
| Sire Strike the Gold 1988 | Majestic Gold; 1979 | Majestic Secret | Secret Session |
| Dam Free Trade 1994 | Shareef Dancer; 1980 | Northern Dancer | Nearctic |
| Dam Free Trade 1994 | Shareef Dancer; 1980 | Northern Dancer | Natalma |
| Dam Free Trade 1994 | Shareef Dancer; 1980 | Sweet Alliance | Sir Ivor |
| Dam Free Trade 1994 | Shareef Dancer; 1980 | Sweet Alliance | Mrs. Peterkin |
| Dam Free Trade 1994 | El Vino; 1975 | Habitat | Sir Gaylord |
| Dam Free Trade 1994 | El Vino; 1975 | Habitat | Little Hut |
| Dam Free Trade 1994 | El Vino; 1975 | Press Corps | Realm |
| Dam Free Trade 1994 | El Vino; 1975 | Press Corps | Paper Sun (Family: 16-a) |
