= Mümin Çılgın =

Turkish jockey

Personal information
- Born: 1935 (age 90–91) Tekirdağ, Turkey
- Occupation: Jockey

Horse racing career
- Sport: Horse racing

Major racing wins
- Gazi Race (1960, 1965, 1974, 1979, 1981, 1985, 1986, 1988, 1991); President's Race (1957, 1964, 1966, 1968, 1969, 1974, 1975, 1976)

Significant horses
- Helene De Troia, Apaçi, Nadas, Dr. Seferof, Dersim, Uğurtay, Hafız, Top Image, Abbas

Mümin Çılgın (born 1935) is a Turkish former racehorse jockey, best known for his record winning of nine races at the Gazi Race, Turkey's most prestigious horse racing event.

He was born in 1935 in Tekirdağ. In 1953, he left his hometown to go to Istanbul. However, he entered horse jockeying in İzmir by the William Giraud stable, where he became apprentice to trainer Sedat Evliyazade.

Mümin Çılgın won his first race on May 5, 1956 with the racehorse "Dilamiye" owned by the then prime minister Adnan Menderes. After winning ten races in the same year, he was promoted from apprentice jockey to fully fledged jockey in accordance with the regulations effective at the time.

Following many successful races, he became a master jockey, and was nicknamed "Mümin Hoca" (literally: Master Mümin). Between 1956 and 1999, Mümin Çılgın rod 44 years long racehorses and won nine time the Gazi Race.

Year	Racehorse
1960	Helene De Troia
1965	Apaçi
1974	Nadas
1979	Dr. Seferof
1981	Dersim
1985	Uğurtay
1986	Hafız
1988	Top Image
1991	Abbas

In addition, Çılgın won in the years 1957, 1964, 1966, 1968, 1969, 1974, 1975 and 1976 eight times the President's Race, country's second most prestigious horse racing event held at the Ankara 75th Anniversary Race Course.

Mümin Çılgın retired in 1999 from active racehorse riding. However, he is still present in horse racing as a racehorse owner and trainer.
