= Ankara 75th Anniversary Race Course =

Horse racing track in Ankara, Turkey

Coordinates: 39.96942°N 32.68218°E

Ankara 75th Anniversary Race Course Ankara 75. Yıl Hipodromu
- Interactive map of Ankara 75th Anniversary Race Course; Ankara 75. Yıl Hipodromu
- Location: Batıkent, Yenimahalle, Ankara, Turkey
- Owned by: Jockey Club of Turkey (TJK)
- Date opened: 1998; 27 years ago
- Screened on: TJK TV
- Course type: Flat/Thoroughbred
- Notable races: Republic of Turkey Stakes (since 1981); Presidency Cup (since 1939); Grand National Assembly of Turkey Cup (since 1951); Queen Elizabeth II Cup (since 1971); Ankara Stakes (since 1950)

Ankara 75th Anniversary Race Course (Turkish: Ankara 75. Yıl Hipodromu) is a horse racing track located at Batıkent neighborhood in Yenimahalle district of Ankara, Turkey. It is founded in 1998, which was the 75th anniversary of Turkish Republic's foundation.

== Physical attributes ==
The race course covers an area of 138.3 ha (342 acres) consisting of facilities for racing, training and barns. The race course has three tracks as:

- a 2,200 m (2,400 yd) long and 30 m (98 ft) wide turf oval,
- a 2,055 m (2,247 yd) long and 20 m (66 ft) wide sand track and
- a 1,900 m (2,100 yd) long and 15 m (49 ft) wide oval training.

The track's total spectator capacity is 8,700 with 2,300 seats. The complex, built on four storeys, comprises offices, social and recreational facilities.

== Major races ==
- Republic of Turkey Stakes (Cumhuriyet Koşusu) is the most prestigious flat racing in Turkey after the Gazi Race, which is run at Veliefendi Race Course in Istanbul. Established in 1981, it is held on the last weekend of October (Republic Day, 29 October). 22 purebred Arabian horses that are 3-year-old and older compete over a distance of 1,600 m (1,700 yd) on the turf track. The winner is awarded a total money prize of TL 1.275 million (approx. US$900,000 as of October 2010) accompanied by a trophy bestowed by the Turkish president.
- Presidency Cup (Cumhurbaşkanlığı Koşusu), held since 1939 in honor of the Turkish president, is the country's another prestigious flat racing. It is run on the same day with Republic Race over a distance of 2,400 m (2,600 yd) on the turf track by 9 to 14 thoroughbred horses that are 3-year-old and older. The award totals to TL 743,750 (approx. US$520,000 as of October 2010) and a trophy bestowed by the Turkish president.
