= List of Turkish flat horse races =

A list of notable flat horse races which take place annually in Turkey, including all conditions races which currently hold Group status in the European Pattern. Turkish races were first included in the pattern in 2009.

== Group 2 ==
Month	Race Name	Racecourse	Dist. (m)	Age/Sex
September	International Bosphorus Cup	Veliefendi	2,400	3yo+ c&f
September	International Topkapi Trophy	Veliefendi	1,600	3yo+ c&f

== Group 3 ==
Month	Race Name	Racecourse	Dist. (m)	Age/Sex
September	International Istanbul Trophy	Veliefendi	1,600	3yo+ f

== Local Group 2 ==
Month	Race Name	Racecourse	Dist. (m)	Age/Sex
September	International Anatolia Trophy (Polytrack)	Veliefendi	2,000	3yo+

== Local Group 3 ==
Month	Race Name	Racecourse	Dist. (m)	Age/Sex
September	International Trakya Trophy	Veliefendi	1,200	2yo
