= Yenimahalle =

- District and municipality
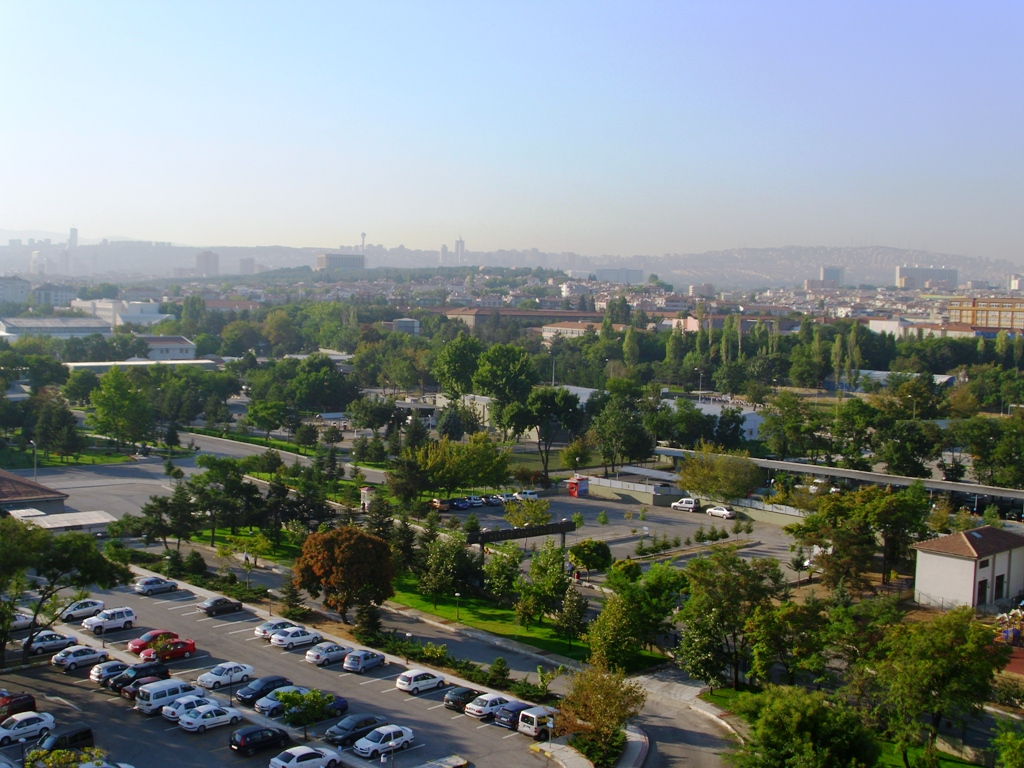

- Logo

- Map showing Yenimahalle District in Ankara Province

- Location within Turkey Location within Turkey Central Anatolia
- Coordinates: 39°58′19″N 32°48′43″E
- Country: Turkey
- Province: Ankara

Government
  - Mayor: Fethi Yaşar (CHP)
- Area: 219 km^{2} (85 sq mi)
- Elevation: 861 m (2,825 ft)
- Population (2022): 704,652
  - Density: 3,220/km^{2} (8,330/sq mi)
- Time zone: UTC+3 (TRT)
- Postal code: 06170
- Area code: 0312
- Website: www.yenimahalle.bel.tr

Yenimahalle is a municipality and metropolitan district of Ankara Province, Turkey. Its area is 219 km^{2}, and its population is 704,652 (2022). It is a fast-growing urban residential district of the city of Ankara, Turkey's capital. Its elevation is 861 m (2,825 ft).

== Yenimahalle today ==
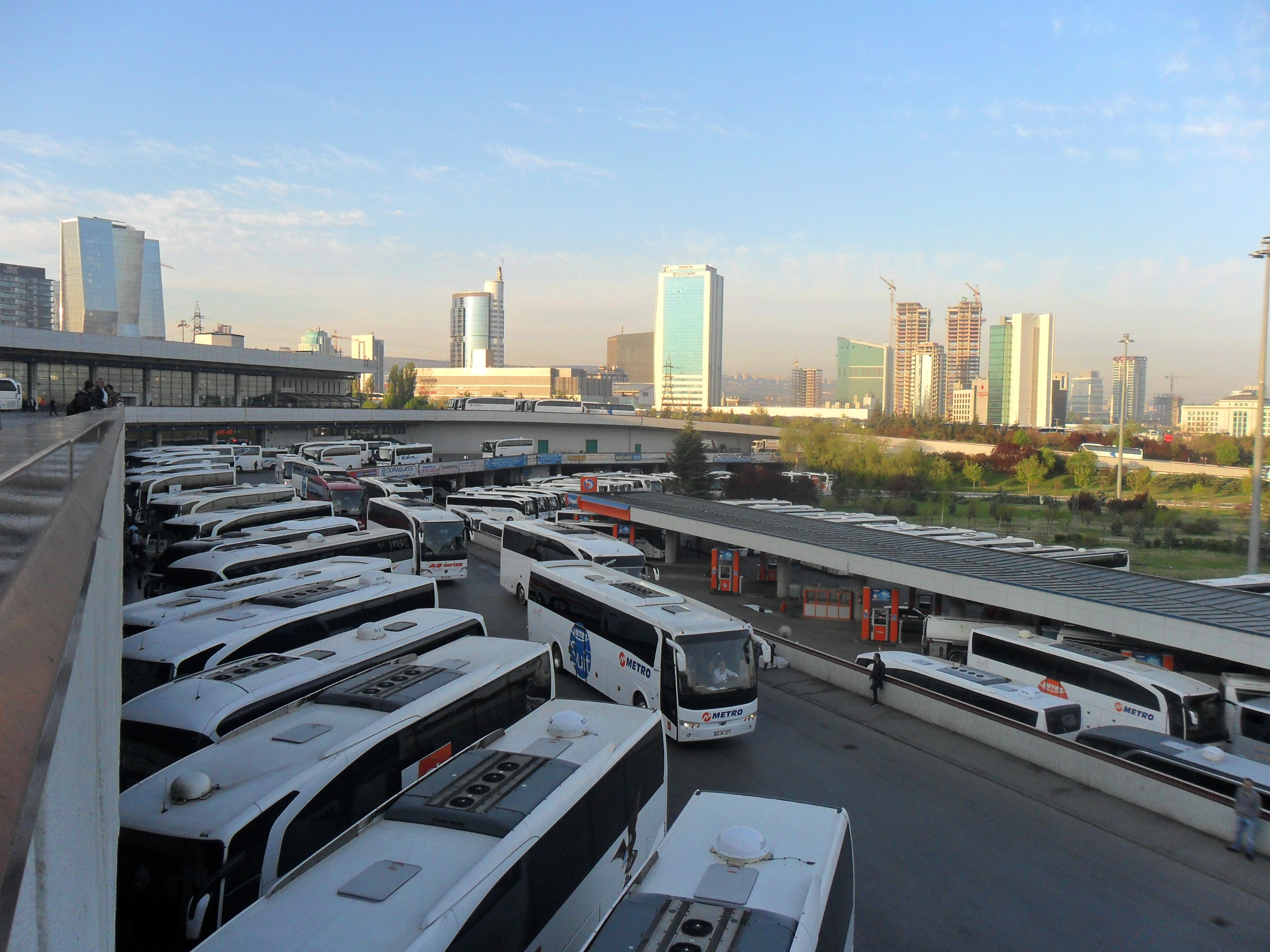
Skyline of Söğütözü business district, as seen from the Intercity Bus Terminal (AŞTİ) in Yenimahalle.

The name Yenimahalle means the new quarter and in the late 1940s the area of open land to the west of the city was allocated for civil servants and workers housing. This grew with the construction of the E5 highway through the area and even more when the metro was built. Today the district mainly consists of large estates of apartment buildings and although the area is being filled up with concrete buildings there is still green space, tennis courts and other sports areas. There is some illegal building at the edge of the district but Yenimahalle is mainly planned development. This is the home for both of Ankara's teams: Gençlerbirliği and Ankaragücü, although their shared stadium is in Altındağ.

82% of the working population are civil servants or workers in the city of Ankara. There is also a large retired community, and a small but growing number of traders and shopkeepers. Ankara's largest industrial area, OSTIM Industrial Zone, is on the edge of the district too. The rural areas are used mainly for growing grains and pulses.

The headquarters of the national intelligence service Millî İstihbarat Teşkilâtı is in Yenimahalle.

== Demographics ==
Historical population
Year	Pop.	±% p.a.
2007	614,778	—
2012	687,042	+2.25%
2017	659,603	−0.81%
2022	704,652	+1.33%
Source: TÜIK (2007-2022)

== Composition ==
There are 55 neighbourhoods in Yenimahalle District:

- 25 Mart
- Anadolu
- Aşağı Yahyalar
- Ata
- Avcılar
- Barış
- Barıştepe
- Batı Sitesi
- Beştepe
- Burç
- Çamlıca
- Çarşı
- Çiğdemtepe
- Demet
- Demetgül
- Demetlale
- Emniyet
- Ergazi
- Ergenekon
- Esentepe
- Gayret
- Gazi
- Güventepe
- Güzelyaka
- İlkyerleşim
- İnönü
- Işınlar
- İvedikköy
- Kaletepe
- Karacakaya
- Kardelen
- Karşıyaka
- Kayalar
- Kentkoop
- Kuzey Yıldızı
- Macun
- Mehmet Akif Ersoy
- Memlik
- Ostim
- Özevler
- Pamuklar
- Ragıp Tüzün
- Serhat
- Susuz
- Tepealtı
- Turgut Özal
- Uğur Mumcu
- Varlık
- Yakacık
- Yenibatı
- Yeniçağ
- Yeşilevler
- Yukarı Yahyalar
- Yunus Emre
- Yuva

== Places of interest ==
- Akköprü, a bridge over the Ankara River, built by the Seljuk Turks in 1222, on the old trade route to Baghdad.
- Atatürk Forest Farm and Zoo, park and farm, financed by Mustafa Kemal Atatürk (1881-1938) personally to provide a place of recreation and agriculture in the city. It contains the Ankara Zoo and a full-size replica of the house in Salonica (today in Greece), where Atatürk was born.
- Ankara 75th Anniversary Race Course, horse racetrack
