= Dersim (horse) =

Turkish racehorse (1978–2011)

- Sire: Calaboose
- Grandsire: Crepello
- Dam: Saika
- Damsire: Floche Royale
- Sex: Stallion
- Foaled: March 9, 1978
- Died: April 19, 2011 (aged 33)
- Country: Turkey
- Colour: Chestnut
- Breeder: Ahmet Cemal Kura
- Owner: Ahmet Cemal Kura
- Trainer: Oktay Ergökçen
- Jockey: Mümin Çılgın
- Record: 16: 13–1–1

Major wins
- Gazi Derby (1981)

Dersim (1978 - 2011) was a Turkish racehorse that raced in Turkey in 1980 and 1981. In his 17 starts, with the exclusion of his first maiden race, he never placed lower than third. His greatest result was his victory at the Grade 1 1981 Gazi Derby, winning with a time of 2.28.90.

In the same year, Dersim was also meant to be the Turkish representative for the Japan Racing Association's inaugural running of the Japan Cup, an international invitational event designed to allow Japan's best racehorses to compete against the world on home turf. Originally another horse, Levano, had been scheduled to go. However, after being invited Levano abruptly retired from racing after an injury, leaving Dersim to take his place.

The endeavour was a disaster for Dersim's team. Originally aiming to leave for Japan on October 24, just before their plane departed the engine broke down, delaying their flight by a week. During pre-race training while still in quarantine, Dersim developed a bowed tendon, and had to permanently retire from racing.

After returning to Turkey, Dersim became a stud horse, in service from 1984 to 1998. Although none of his progeny won any graded races, 23 of his foals competed in Turkish Jockey Clubs, with a cumulative total of 68 victories between them.

Dersim died on 19 April 2011, at 33 years old.

== Pedigree ==
Pedigree of Dersim (USA), chestnut stallion 1978
| Sire Calaboose (GB) 1966 | Crepello (GB); 1954 | Donatello (FR) | Blenheim (GB) |
| Sire Calaboose (GB) 1966 | Crepello (GB); 1954 | Donatello (FR) | Delleana (GB) |
| Sire Calaboose (GB) 1966 | Crepello (GB); 1954 | Crepuscule (GB) | Mieuxce (GB) |
| Sire Calaboose (GB) 1966 | Crepello (GB); 1954 | Crepuscule (GB) | Red Sunset (GB) |
| Sire Calaboose (GB) 1966 | La Fresnes (GB); 1953 | Court Martial (GB) | Fair Trial (GB) |
| Sire Calaboose (GB) 1966 | La Fresnes (GB); 1953 | Court Martial (GB) | Instantaneous (GB) |
| Sire Calaboose (GB) 1966 | La Fresnes (GB); 1953 | Pin Stripe (GB) | Hyperion (GB) |
| Sire Calaboose (GB) 1966 | La Fresnes (GB); 1953 | Pin Stripe (GB) | Herringbone (GB) |
| Dam Saika (GB) 1965 | Floche Royale (TUR); 1957 | Caerlaverock (GB) | Hyperion (GB) |
| Dam Saika (GB) 1965 | Floche Royale (TUR); 1957 | Caerlaverock (GB) | Blue Angel (GB) |
| Dam Saika (GB) 1965 | Floche Royale (TUR); 1957 | Polaris (TUR) | Legal Fare I (GB) |
| Dam Saika (GB) 1965 | Floche Royale (TUR); 1957 | Polaris (TUR) | Santalin (GB) |
| Dam Saika (GB) 1965 | Feruzehatun (TUR); 1960 | Rock Star (GB) | Rockefella (GB) |
| Dam Saika (GB) 1965 | Feruzehatun (TUR); 1960 | Rock Star (GB) | Cosmetic (GB) |
| Dam Saika (GB) 1965 | Feruzehatun (TUR); 1960 | Lambing Time (GB) | Anamnestes (IRE) |
| Dam Saika (GB) 1965 | Feruzehatun (TUR); 1960 | Lambing Time (GB) | First Four (IRE) |
