= Bold Pilot =

Turkish Thoroughbred racehorse

- Sire: Persian Bold
- Grandsire: Bold Lad
- Dam: Rosa Palumbo
- Damsire: Imperial Fling
- Sex: Stallion
- Foaled: April 21, 1993
- Died: April 30, 2015
- Country: Turkey
- Breeder: Özdemir Atman
- Owner: Özdemir Atman
- Trainer: Yaşar Kara
- Record: 30: 21–4–2
- Earnings: $880,000

Major wins
- Çaldıran Race (1995) Erkek Tay Deneme (1996) Gazi Race (1996) Başbakanlık Race (1996) Ankara Race (1996) Başbakanlık Race (1997) Türkiye Jokey Kulübü (1997)

Bold Pilot (April 21, 1993 – April 30, 2015) was a Turkish thoroughbred racehorse. He was sired by Persian Bold and owned by Özdemir Atman. He started his career by winning a condition race called "Asuvan" and won Çaldıran, S.İ.A.Y. VE SAH.DER and Sakarya when he was two-years old.As a three-year-old, he won 8 of the 9 races he entered including the Erkek Tay Deneme,Gazi Race, Habitat II, Mimar Sinan, Başbakalık, Boğaziçi and Ankara. He set a track record in the 1996 edition of the Gazi Race, recording a time of 2.26.22. His other important wins are 19 Mayıs,İsmet İnönü, Fevzi Çakmak(2 times), Başbakanlık and Türkiye Jokey Kulübü.In total, he won 21 of the 30 races he entered. He is the 7th triple crowner in Türkiye.Bold Pilot died on 30 April 2015 in Istanbul.

== Pedigree ==
Pedigree of Bold Pilot
Sire Persian Bold 1975	Bold Lad 1964	Bold Ruler	Nasrullah
Sire Persian Bold 1975	Bold Lad 1964	Bold Ruler	Miss Disco
Sire Persian Bold 1975	Bold Lad 1964	Barn Pride	Democratic
Sire Persian Bold 1975	Bold Lad 1964	Barn Pride	Fair Alycia
Sire Persian Bold 1975	Relkarunner 1968	Relko	Tanerko
Sire Persian Bold 1975	Relkarunner 1968	Relko	Relance
Sire Persian Bold 1975	Relkarunner 1968	Running Blue	Blue Peter
Sire Persian Bold 1975	Relkarunner 1968	Running Blue	Run Honey
Dam Rosa Palumbo 1985	Imperial Fling 1976	Northern Dancer	Nearctic
Dam Rosa Palumbo 1985	Imperial Fling 1976	Northern Dancer	Natalma
Dam Rosa Palumbo 1985	Imperial Fling 1976	Royal Dilemma	Buckpasser
Dam Rosa Palumbo 1985	Imperial Fling 1976	Royal Dilemma	Queen Empress
Dam Rosa Palumbo 1985	Robbia 1978	Viani	Acropolis
Dam Rosa Palumbo 1985	Robbia 1978	Viani	Violante Vanni
Dam Rosa Palumbo 1985	Robbia 1978	Rosina Schnidler	Silly Season
Dam Rosa Palumbo 1985	Robbia 1978	Rosina Schnidler	Rosalie Renaudin
