= Veliyyüddin Efendi =

Ottoman scholar and calligrapher

Veliyyüddin Efendi, also known as Veli Efendi or Ekşiaşzâde or Imad-ı Rûm, was an Ottoman scholar and calligrapher of the 17th and 18th centuries and was twice Sheikh al-Islam of the Ottoman Empire.

== Early life ==
Veliyyüddin was born in the Yayla area of Silivrikapı, Istanbul, possibly in 1684. His father was Solakbaşı Hacı Mustafa Ağa, a Janissary leader. His grandfather Hacı Hüseyin Ağa probably also held a similar position.

== Career ==
During the time Ebezâde Abdullah Efendi was Sheikh al-Islam (1708-1710 or 1712–1713), Veliyyüddin was müderris at the madrasa built by his father in the Arabacı Bayezid area of Silivrikapı. Veliyyüddin came to the attention of Grand Vizier Nevşehirli Damat İbrahim Paşa, who appointed him an inspector of foundations. Veliyyüddin was made qadi of Aleppo in 1729, but was dismissed from this post the following year. Four months later, he was made qadi of Galata. He also served as qadi in Cairo and Medina, during which time he performed the hajj for the first time. In May 1756, he was appointed kazasker of Anatolia, and in April 1758, kazasker of Rumelia. In August 1758, he was dismissed and exiled to Manisa because of a petition submitted to Sultan Mustafa III claiming that he had accepted a bribe. When Çelebizâde Âsım Efendi was appointed Sheikh al-Islam in 1759, Veliyyüddin was pardoned at the request of Grand Vizier Ragıb Paşa and the new Sheikh al-Islam and was allowed to return to Istanbul.

When Âsım died in February 1760, Veliyyüddin was appointed Sheikh al-Islam. He was dismissed September 1761, apparently because of his harsh temperament. After his dismissal, he was sent to Bursa and told to stay until hajj season, at which time he went on hajj another time. Eventually, he was pardoned and allowed again to return to Istanbul. In April 1767, when Dürrîzâde Mustafa Efendi was dismissed as Sheikh al-Islam, Veliyyüddin was appointed a second time. During one of his terms as Sheikh al-Islam, he established a board of physicians to prevent people from practicing medicine without training.

Veliyyüddin learned calligraphy from Durmuşzâde Ahmed Efendi and went on to become a master of Ottoman taliq and calligraphy instructor to Sultan Mustafa III, Sultan Ahmed III, as well as many others. Veliyyüddin also had a special interest in floriculture, especially tulips.

== Death and burial ==
Veliyyüddin died on October 25 (or 15), 1768 from an illness related to old age. He was buried next to the zawiya of Murad Efendi (Murad Buhârî) near Otakçılar in Eyüp, Istanbul.

== Legacy ==
Veliyyüddin was apparently affiliated with Murad Buhârî, who introduced the Naqshbandi-Mujaddidi Sufi order in Anatolia.

Veliyyüddin's older son Mustafa Reşid Efendi was a müderris; he died in 1767 and was buried in Fatih. Veliyyüddin's younger son Hacı Mehmed Emin Efendi was appointed kazasker of Rumelia three times; he died in 1806 and was buried near the Sufi lodge of Şeyh Murad in Eyüp.

Among his charitable works, Veliyyüddin built a small mosque (mescit) and place for sema (tevhithâne) at the zawiya of Murad Efendi; a muvakkithane at the Koca Mustafa Paşa Mosque; a park (mesire) and fountain in the Çırpıcıçayırı area between Zeytinburnu and Bakırköy (now used for horse races under the name Veliefendi Race Course); and a library next to Bayezid Mosque. The library was founded in 1768 in a former madrasa with the donation of 1690 books (in addition to 150 books Veliyyüddin had previously donated to the Âtıf Efendi Library in 1761) and the establishment of a foundation to ensure its management. (The library is now managed by the Beyazıt Manuscript Library.)

Veliyyüddin's surviving calligraphic designs include inscriptions on

- a sebil, a çeşme, and a courtyard gate for a mosque built by Hekimoğlu Ali Paşa,
- a sebil, a fountain, and two courtyard gates for a mosque built by Grand Vizier Ali Paşa,
- the Nevşehirli Damad İbrâhim Paşa sebil,
- the Dârülhadis fountain,
- the Veliyyüddin Efendi Library,
- the Tımışvar (Sheikh al-Islam Mustafa Efendi) Sufi Lodge, Baba Haydar neighborhood, Eyüp
- the Ayazma Mosque, Üsküdar
- the Aya Irini Arsenal (after the restoration by Ahmed III).

Also, Veliyyüddin's calligraphic work is preserved in a few albums (murakka‘) in the Turkish and Islamic Arts Museum (no. 2444), the Topkapı Palace Museum Library (Güzel Yazılar, no. 220), and the Istanbul University Library (FY, nos. 1225, 1425, 1428).
