= Presidential Palace (Turkey) =

- Cumhurbaşkanlığı Sarayı
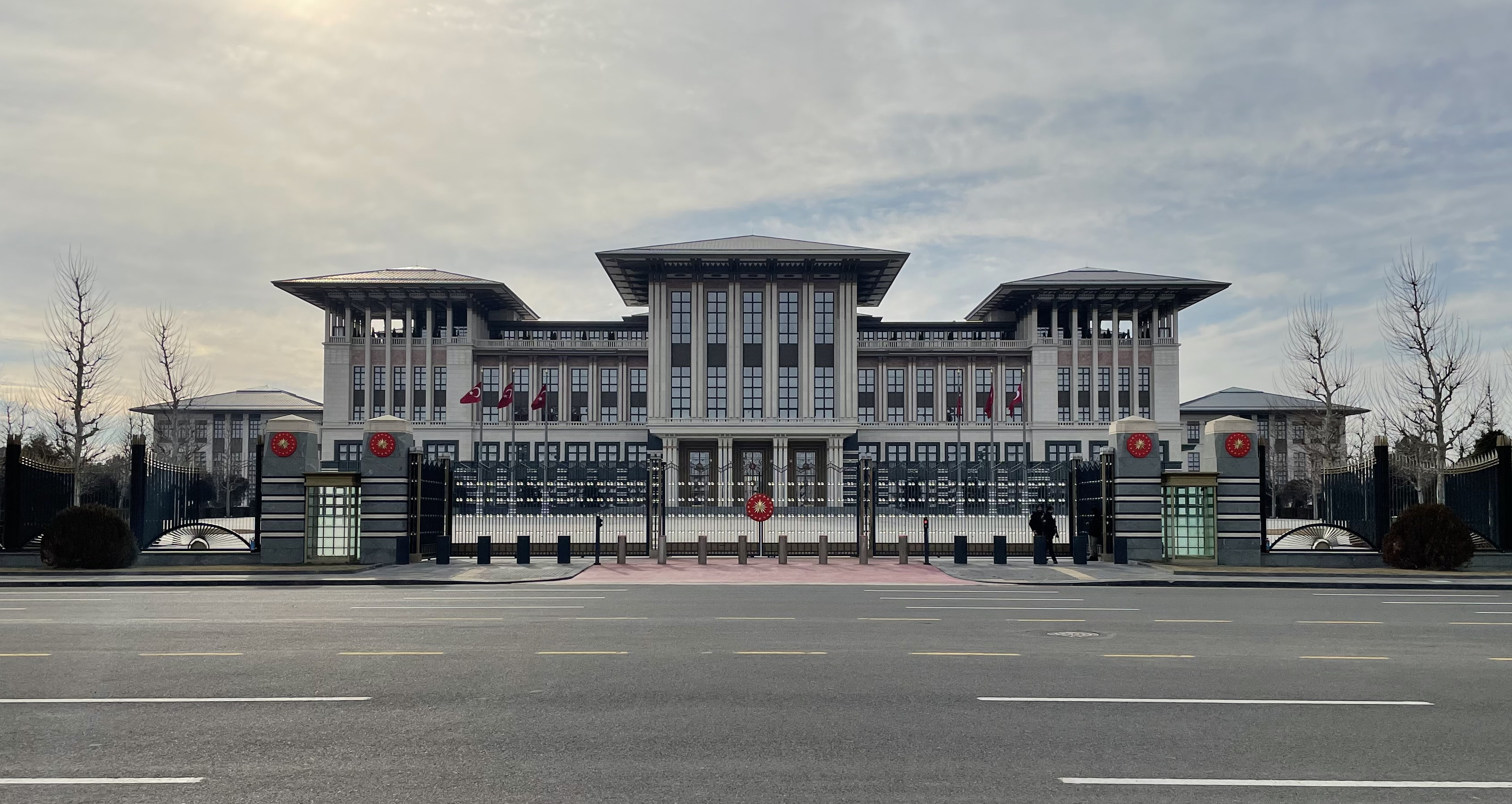
- A frontal view of the palace

General information
- Architectural style: Seljuk · Ottoman
- Location: Atatürk Forest Farm, Beştepe, Ankara
- Current tenants: President of Turkey
- Groundbreaking: 2012
- Construction started: 2012
- Completed: 2014
- Inaugurated: 29 October 2014

Design and construction
- Architect: Şefik Birkiye

The Presidential Palace (Turkish: Cumhurbaşkanlığı Sarayı) is the complex of office buildings used by the President of Turkey, located within the Presidential Complex on the grounds of the Atatürk Forest Farm in Ankara, the capital of Turkey. It is also referred to as the White Palace (Ak Saray), in reference to its construction during the rule of the Justice and Development Party (also known as AK Party).

== History ==
=== Construction and legal proceedings ===
The palace was initially designed as a new headquarters for the country's prime ministers. Various proposals were prepared in Turkey, but the project was awarded to Şefik Birkiye. Construction began in 2013.

The Ankara Branch of the Chamber of Architects, affiliated with the TMMOB, began monitoring the construction of buildings on the grounds of the Atatürk Forest Farm, which was designated as a green space, and requested the construction permit. The permit was officially requested from the Metropolitan Municipality and the Prime Ministry. Three months later, it was sent by the TOKİ. An application was filed to annul the permit because it did not include the name of the project's author.

The building's structural construction was completed in August 2013. A total of 10,000 trees were removed to make way for access roads. It was announced that the building would consist of three blocks, covering a total area of 150,000 square meters. The following facilities were planned: A Government Operations Center would be located on the second basement floor. The center, which would use special reinforced concrete supported by steel, would be protected against bomb, missile, chemical, and nuclear attacks and would provide uninterrupted communications 24 hours a day. In the event of a crisis, commanders, ministries, and relevant departments would be able to gather at this center. A helicopter landing pad would also be located within the complex.

On 4 March 2014, the Council of State issued a decision to halt construction of the building.

Following Recep Tayyip Erdoğan's election as president on 10 August 2014, it was announced that the building would be allocated to the presidency. Çankaya Mansion was instead converted into a new headquarters for the prime minister. Since Çankaya had served as the symbolic center of the presidency since the founding of the country, this development was regarded as a historic change.

In 2015, the Council of State's Administrative Litigation Chambers rejected unanimously the decision in principle of the Conservation Board that had paved the way for the construction of the palace on a protected heritage site. The decision stated: "Since historical sites must be protected together with their natural structures, construction and physical interventions that could damage vegetation, topography, or the visual silhouette of these areas have been prohibited."

=== Architectural style ===
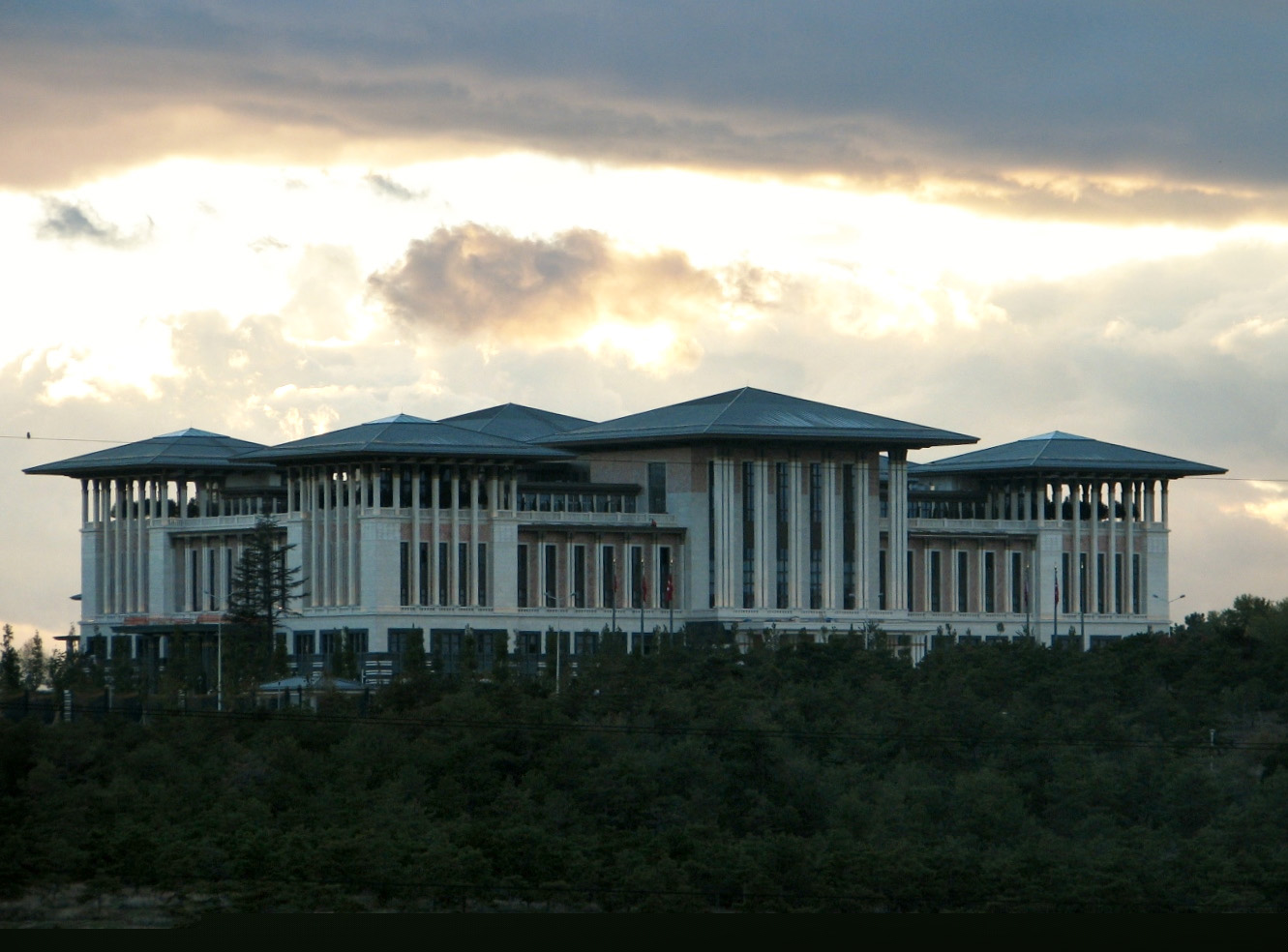
A photograph of the palace from 2014

The building's architectural style was described as a combination of Ottoman and Seljuk styles. Architect Doğan Hasol stated that the palace had no features reflecting Seljuk architecture:

"Why Seljuk, why Ottoman, why imitation? There are no surviving Seljuk palaces that could serve as examples; and which Ottoman palace are you imitating? Topkapı, Dolmabahçe, or Beylerbeyi? The real question is: Why imitate? Imitation is unacceptable in architecture, just as it is in every other branch of art. An architect's duty is to create innovative and original works suited to contemporary needs, using the opportunities provided by modern technology. Yet today, the government is pursuing the creation of an architectural style through historical nostalgia. The public sector is forcing architects to produce buildings as though a Seljuk-Ottoman synthesis were possible. (...) Ideological approaches that look backward and attempt to transfer forms from history have been tried repeatedly in many countries, particularly during periods of authoritarian rule. Examples include Hitler's Germany, Mussolini's Italy, and the Soviet Union under Stalin..."

=== Cost ===
In November 2014, the building's cost was announced as 1,370,000,000 Turkish liras.

=== Number of rooms ===
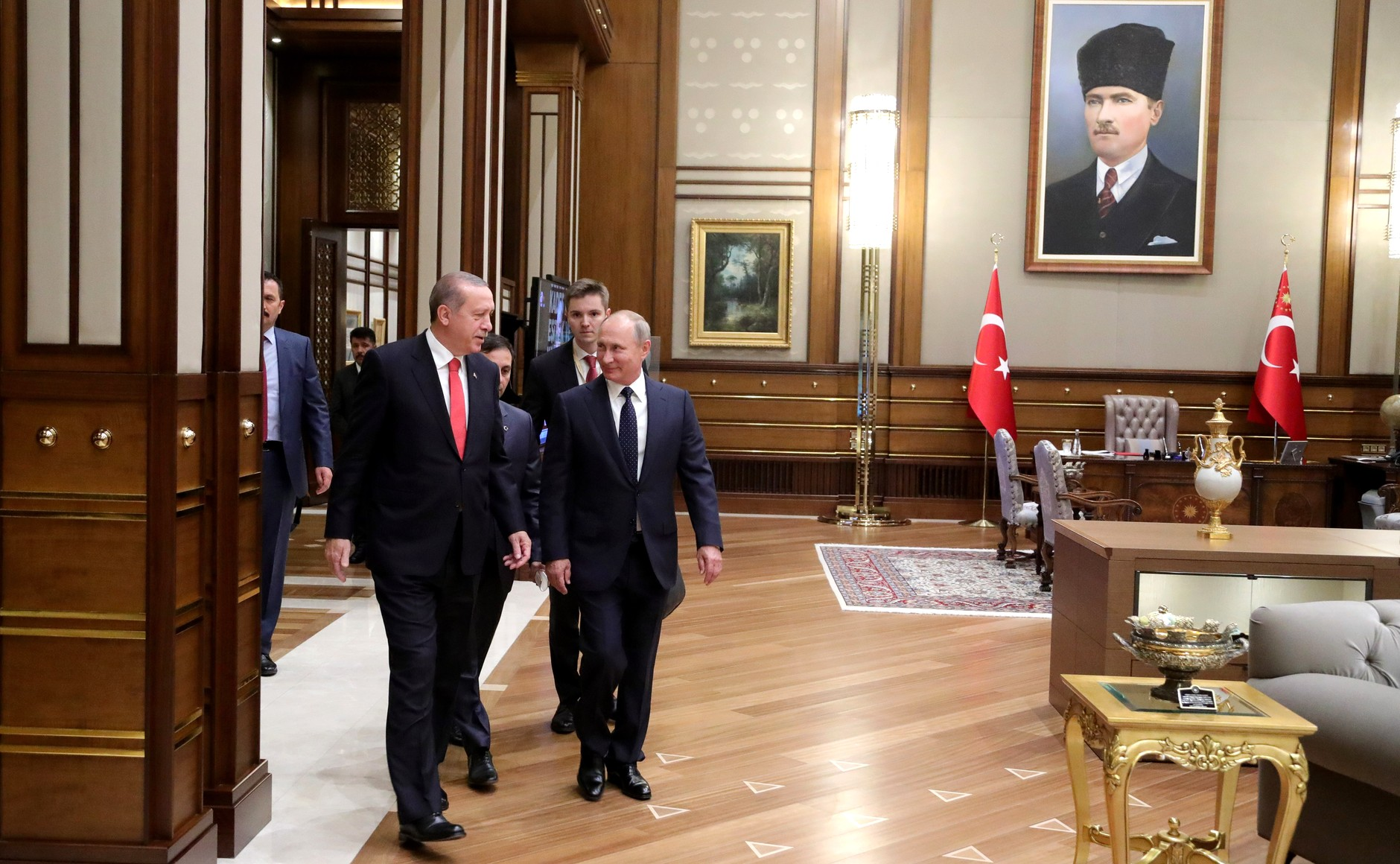
President Erdoğan in his office with President of Russia Vladimir Putin, September 2017

After the palace was described in the media as having 1,000 rooms, Erdoğan stated that it had 1,150 rooms and that "prestige is not something one can economize on." Tezcan Karakuş Candan, chairman of the Ankara Branch of the Chamber of Architects, claimed that the palace was a world record-holder with 2,250 rooms.

=== Operating expenses ===
The Chamber of Architects claimed that the monthly expenses for electricity, water, natural gas, heating, cooling, cleaning, and landscaping at the Presidential Palace, which had also been criticized for its high construction cost, amounted to at least 21 million Turkish lira.

The palace's expenses were also documented in a report by the Court of Accounts.

Republican People's Party Ankara MP Murat Emir brought the palace's costs before parliament in response to Minister of Development Cevdet Yılmaz raising the issue of parliament's hourly operating cost during budget discussions:

"By stating that one hour of work by Parliament, where the will of the nation is reflected, costs 600,000 TL, he has sought to open up debate on the parliamentary system they intend to abolish through this approach and to devalue Parliament. (...) In the Grand National Assembly of Turkey, there are 550 elected members of parliament, including Minister Yılmaz himself. If we divide the 600,000 TL figure cited by Yılmaz by this number, the hourly cost per MP comes to 1,090 lira."

Emir stated that a budget of 434 million TL had been allocated to the presidency for that year. Divided by the number of days in the year, he said, the palace's daily cost amounted to 1,189,000 TL, while its hourly cost, assuming an eight-hour working day, was 148,630 TL. He added:

"While 1,090 TL is spent per hour for one member of parliament, the hourly expenditure for Recep Tayyip Erdoğan is 148,630 TL. In other words, Recep Tayyip Erdoğan is equivalent to approximately 148 members of parliament."

== Events ==
It was officially announced that the palace would be inaugurated during a Republic Day reception on 29 October 2014, commemorating the country's 91st anniversary. However, the opening reception was canceled because some invited participants announced that they would boycott the event, and due to the Ermenek mining accident.

During the military coup attempt on the night between 15 and 16 July 2016, the area surrounding the palace was bombed several times by those attempting to carry out the coup, identified as the Peace at Home Council.

== Criticism ==
The construction of the Presidential Palace, initially called the White Palace (Ak Saray), attracted considerable criticism because it was built using approximately 50 dönüms of land belonging to the Atatürk Forest Farm in Ankara.

Although several court rulings were issued ordering construction to be halted because building was prohibited on the Atatürk Forest Farm, which was protected as a conservation site, construction was nevertheless completed. The opposition regarded this as an outright violation of the rule of law.

The project faced severe criticism and allegations concerning corruption during construction, damage to wildlife, and the destruction of the farm's zoo to make way for new roads. It was also called the Kaç-Ak Saray (an expression meaning "Illegal Palace") by opponents who considered its construction unlawful.

The palace, which had approximately 1,150 rooms and cost $350 million (€270 million), attracted widespread criticism because its construction and commencement of use coincided with a period when mining accidents and workers' rights dominated the national agenda.

In 2015, an additional eight dönüms of land from the Atatürk Forest Farm, an inheritance of Mustafa Kemal Atatürk, was allocated to the Presidential Palace.

== Gallery ==
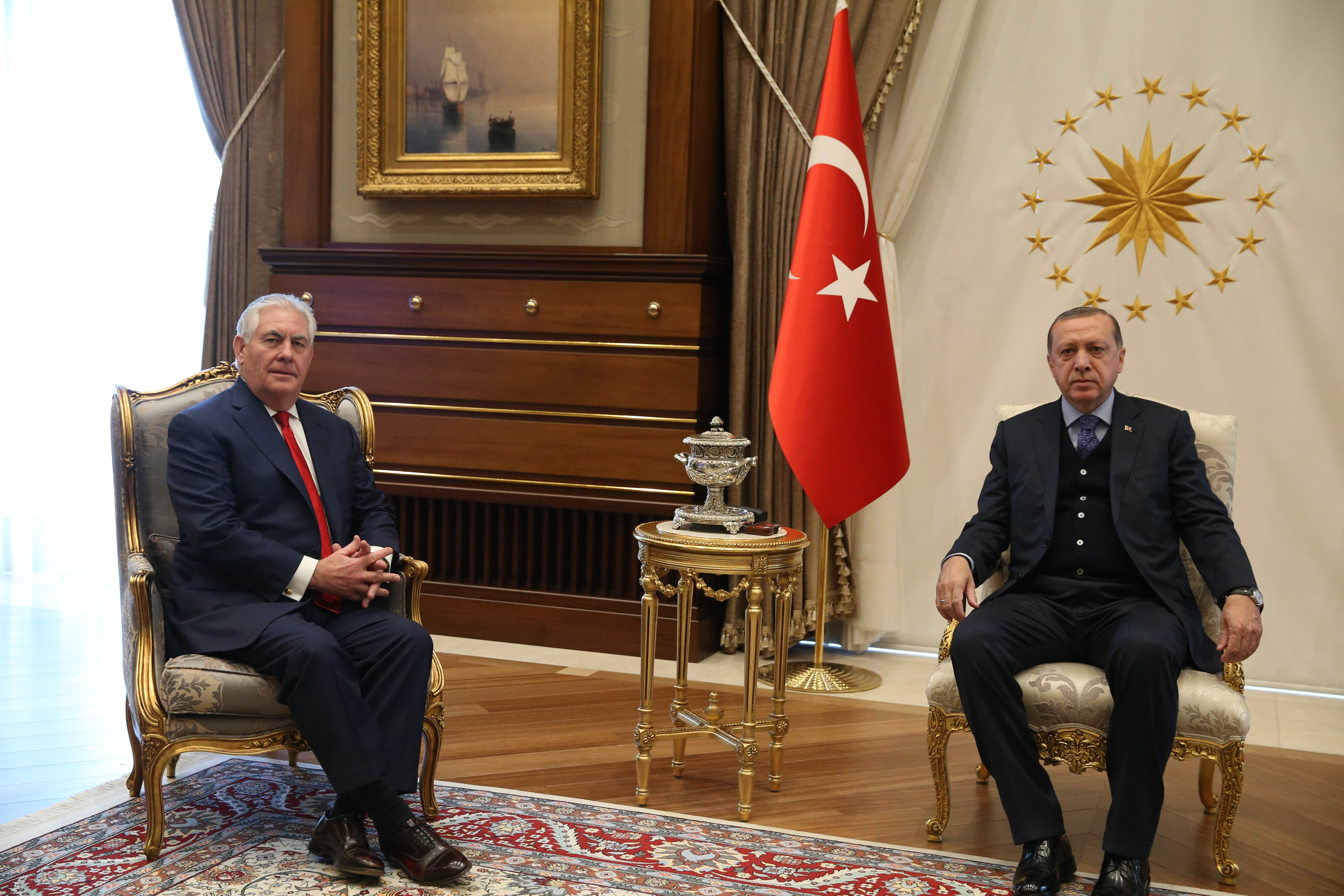
Meeting room

== See also ==
- Çankaya Mansion
- Huber Mansion
- Dolmabahçe Palace Working Office
- Yıldız Palace
