= International Topkapi Trophy =

- Class: Group 2
- Location: Veliefendi Race Course; Istanbul, Turkey
- Race type: Flat
- Sponsor: Longines

Race information
- Distance: 1,600 metres (1 mile)
- Surface: Turf
- Track: Right-handed
- Qualification: Three-years-old and up, geldings not allowed
- Weight: 56 kg (3yo); 60 kg (4yo+); Allowances; 1½ kg for fillies and mares

The International Topkapi Trophy is a Group 2 flat horse race in Turkey open to horses aged three years or older. It is run at Veliefendi Race Course over a distance of 1,600 metres (about 1 mile), and it is scheduled to take place each year in early September. The race is part of Istanbul's International Racing Festival.

== History ==
The Topkapi Trophy was elevated to international Group 2 level in 2009, though in 2018 it lost that status becoming Local Group 2 and substantially reducing its prizemoney.

== Records since 2000 ==
Most successful horse (3 wins):

- Pressing – (2008), (2009), (2010)

Leading jockey (4 wins):

- Neil Callan – Pressing (2008), (2009), (2010), Glory Awaits (2014)

Leading trainer (3 wins):

- Michael Jarvis – Pressing (2008), (2009), (2010)

== Winners since 2000 ==
Year	Winner	Age	Jockey	Trainer	Time
2000	Huambo	3	Andrasch Starke	Andreas Schutz (GER)	1:35.58
2001	Mary Ellen	3	A Birdal	L Berkol (TUR)	1:35.69
2002	Akindayim	3	Fuat Cakar	(TUR)	1:35.33
2003	Mary Ellen	5	A Birdal	L Berkol (TUR)	1:36.39
2004	Luxor	4	Erhan Yavuz	A Coskan (TUR)	1:35.20
2005	Brunel	4	Andreas Suborics	William Haggas (GB)	1:34.74
2006	Ribella	6	Selim Kaya	O Isgoren (TUR)	1:34.60
2007	Sabirli	6	Halis Karatas	Cemal Kurt (TUR)	1:36.24
2008	Pressing	5	Neil Callan	Michael Jarvis (GB)	1:33.65
2009	Pressing	6	Neil Callan	Michael Jarvis (GB)	1:36.44
2010	Pressing	7	Neil Callan	Michael Jarvis (GB)	1:36.04
2011	Musir	5	Christophe Soumillon	Mike De Kock (SAF)	1:33.58
2012	Master of Hounds	4	Christophe Soumillon	William Haggas (GB)	1:34.49
2013	Producer	4	Richard Hughes	Richard Hannon Sr. (GB)	1:35.33
2014	Glory Awaits	4	Neil Callan	Kevin Ryan (GB)	1:39.75
2015	Toormore	4	James Doyle	Richard Hannon Jr. (GB)	1:35.71
2016	Blond Me	4	Oisin Murphy	Andrew Balding (GB)	1:36.21
2017	Wonnemond	4	Daniele Porcu	Sascha Smrczek (GER)	1:35.28
2018	Runner Bull	4	Özcam Yildirin	Ibrahim Bekiroğulları	1:35.97
2019	Rhythm Divine	4	Özcam Yildirin	Ferhat Tas	1:34.75
2020	Kuzey Kafkasyali	4	Hisman Cizik	Ibrahim Bekirogullari	1:35.78
2021	Call To Victory	4	Ahmet Celik	Batuhan Ay	1:36.16

== See also ==
- List of Turkish flat horse races
