= İvedikköy =

- Neighbourhood
- Location in Turkey İvedikköy (Turkey Central Anatolia)
- Coordinates: 40°00′N 32°47′E
- Country: Turkey
- Province: Ankara
- District: Yenimahalle
- Population (2022): 554
- Time zone: UTC+3 (TRT)

İvedikköy is a neighbourhood in the municipality and district of Yenimahalle, Ankara Province, Turkey. Its population is 554 (2022). İvedik Street is the main road in the neighbourhood. It is bordered by Yakacık, Yuva and Karşıyaka neighbourhoods within the same district. The district gardens were once famous for their watermelon production, though it is now an urban area.

The largest cemetery within the metropolitan city limits of Ankara, the Karşıyaka Cemetery is situated in İvedik. It stretches over an area of 2,890 decares (2.89 km^{2}; 1.12 sq mi) and holds more than 260,000 graves, among them of many prominent people.
