= Halis Karataş =

Turkish jockey (born 1972)

Personal information
- Nationality: Turkish
- Born: 2 October 1972 (age 54) Gürün, Sivas, Turkey
- Height: 1.65 m (5 ft 5 in)

Sport
- Country: Turkey
- Sport: Horse racing
- Event: Jockey

Halis Karataş (born 2 October 1972) is a Turkish jockey, nicknamed "The Magician" (Turkish: Sihirbaz). He is the most successful jockey in Turkish racing history, with 7,236 winners from 26,678 rides as of June 2026, and has won the Gazi Koşusu seven times.

== Early life ==
Karataş was born in Gürün, in the Sivas province of Turkey, into a family of six children working in the horse business; his father and uncle were grooms and his elder brother a jockey. The family moved to Istanbul in 1980, and Karataş left school at 14 to work with horses. He rode his first winner, on a horse named Benhur, in 1987, and became a fully licensed jockey after reaching the required 50 winners in a short time.

== Career ==
In 1996 Karataş won the Gazi Koşusu on Bold Pilot, setting a track record of 2:26.22 that still stands. He has since won the race six more times, in 2005, 2006, 2011, 2012, 2014 and 2026; his seventh title came in the 100th running of the race, on Bay Nalçakan on 28 June 2026.

On 20 July 2012 he won all seven races on the card at Veliefendi Race Course in Istanbul, a Turkish record that equalled the world record set by Frankie Dettori at Ascot on 28 September 1996; he received an Outstanding Achievement Award from the Turkish Ministry of Food, Agriculture and Livestock.

In August 2020 he was suspended from riding for 60 days after striking his mount before a race, an incident that drew criticism on social media.

Karataş was the subject of the 2018 feature film Bizim İçin Şampiyon (Champion), which tells the story of Bold Pilot and his rider.
