= Ata, Yenimahalle =

Ata
- Neighbourhood
- Location in Turkey Ata (Turkey Central Anatolia)
- Coordinates: 40°00′27″N 32°37′03″E
- Country: Turkey
- Province: Ankara
- District: Yenimahalle
- Population (2022): 28,886
- Time zone: UTC+3 (TRT)

Ata is a neighbourhood in the municipality and district of Yenimahalle, Ankara Province, Turkey. Its population is 28,886 (2022).

The name of the neighborhood was determined by the decision of the residents of the neighborhood by a referendum. It means "forefather".

Although there is no neighborhood in it, it is intertwined with the neighborhood of Eryaman, which is the district of Etimesgut.

== Infrastructure and transportation ==
There are many cooperatives and settlements in the neighborhood.

EGO buses depart from Eryaman 1-2 Metro Station to the neighborhood. There is also an EGO bus from the center of Sincan District. Local minibuses connected to Eryaman station also depart from Ulus.

== Population ==
Historical population
Year	Pop.	±% p.a.
2017	22,996	—
2022	28,886	+4.67%
Source: TÜIK (2007-2022)
