= Jockey Club of Turkey =

Jockey Club of Turkey (Turkish: Türkiye Jokey Kulübü, TJK) was founded on 2 November 1950. The club was recognized as public benefit society by the resolution of Council of Ministers in 1953 and named as Jockey club of Turkey by adding the Turkey afterwards the club's name. It is the only institution authorized to conduct horse races and organize mutual betting.

Jockey Club of Turkey has been conducting horse races and organizing mutual betting since 3 October 1953 by the power given by Ministry of Food, Agriculture and Livestock.

Purposes of Jockey Club of Turkey can be summarized as below:

- Enable Turkey to be ranked as one of the most developed countries in horse breeding.
- Organize and conduct horse races in Turkey in accordance with national and international standards.
- Provide essential infrastructures and services ideally for development of horse races and breeding in Turkey.
- Spread the popularity and prestige of horse breeding and horse races nationally and internationally.

== History ==
=== First Eras ===
The first modern organized horse races were conducted in Izmir on 23 September 1856 for the first time. During the leadership of Evliyazade Refik Bey and the tenure of Mr. Patterson as the Consul General of England, the Smyrna Races Club was founded. Izmir races were organized annually on Easter days. S.R.C. races were in their golden ages at the beginning of the 20th century and this ended with the start of 1st World War.

=== Ottoman Jockey Club ===
The opinions of organizing horse races and breeding by means of jockey club in Turkey was tried to be accomplished but there is no clear knowledge on the actions of this club. According to the directory published in 1909, Grand Vizier Sait Halim Pasha was the president of Ottoman Jockey Club.

=== Guild of Cavalryman Races ===
Refik Evliyazade started working for regular races to be organized in Istanbul when S.R.C races came to an end with 1st World War. As a result of the support by the most powerful person of the era, Enver Pasha, Guild of Cavalryman Horse Riding Club and Society of Improving Horse Breed were founded in 1913. Choosing Veliefendi as racetrack coincides with the same era.

=== TJK Era ===
The Jockey Club of Turkey was founded on 23 October 1950 by the period's Secretary of State Fevzi Lutfi Karaosmanoglu, Deputy of Kocaeli Saim Onhon, Halim Sait Turkhan, Nejat Evliyazade and Sait Akson with the approvals of the era's President and Prime Minister. Lounge of the club was opened on the Ziya Gökalp street in Ankara with the attendance of President Celal Bayar on 14 April 1951.

In 1954, 43 races were organized with a daily program in Istanbul, Ankara and Izmir. Today, number of the cities hosting horseraces are increased to 8 with the addition of Adana, Bursa, Sanliurfa, Elazig and Diyarbakir to Istanbul, Ankara and Izmir; also horseraces began to be organized during the whole year without interruption.

As a result of the practices of Jockey Club of Turkey, race incomes rose and huge investments has been made with those incomes. For example; modern racecourses has been built in 9 cities across Turkey in which races are organized. Also, a great importance has been attributed to horse breeding services and those facilities has been built: Pension stud farms in Bursa Karacabey for thoroughbred English Horses, Pension stud farms in Eskisehir Mahmudiye and in Sanliurfa for thoroughbred Arabic Horses. Apart from those facilities, Agean / Torbali, Izmit / Center, Adana / Seyhan, Thrace Insemination Stations has been built; valuable stud horses has been taken to both stud farms and insemination stations and been provided to service of the breeders. Izmir Kosekoy Rehabilitation Center was also opened by Jockey Club of Turkey. With a resolution of the extraordinary congress, headquarter of Jockey Club of Turkey was moved to Istanbul. In 1954 there were 24 founding members, today the number of these members increased to 116.

== Activities ==
Organizing Horseraces and Mutual Bettings : Authorized by the laws, TJK organizes national and international horseraces and mutual bettings.

Horse Breeding : To develop the horse breeding of thoroughbred English and Arabic horses, TJK serves to breeders in stud farms and insemination stations by importing stallions representing the most important blood lines in the world.

Horse Health : TJK provides all kinds of protective and medical services to the race horses at horse clinics located in racetracks, studfarms and insemination stations.

Training Activities : Since TJK is the only institution in its field and does not receive any support from the sources except the Horse Breeding and Racing Vocational schools that TJK and Ministry of Food, Agriculture and Livestock; TJK has undertaken the role of providing the educated and well-trained human resources to keep the sector alive.

Human resources needed by the sector in Turkey:

- Jockey
- Apprantice
- Trainer
- Groom
- Healthcare Personnel
- Administrative Officers

== National and International Races in Turkey ==
Jockey Club of Turkey, holds 8 international races at Ankara 75th Year Racetrack (Elizabeth II. Race) and at Veliefendi Racetrack (7 International Races).

In 2014, on 6 and 7 September International Race Festival will take place with a prize of €1.343.000 to be distributed in 6 races.

== Facilities ==
TJK serves to horse races and breeding with real estates over 20 Millions m^{2}:

- 9 Racecourses (Istanbul, Ankara, Izmir, Adana, Bursa, Sanliurfa, Elazig, Diyarbakir, Kocaeli)
- 5 Covering Stations (Izmit, Thrace/Silivri, Izmir/Torbali, Adana/Seyhan, Eskisehir/ Mahmudiye)
- 2 Pension Studfarms (Karacabey, Sanliurfa)
- 1 Training Center (Izmit)

== Contribution to Employment and Economy ==
Horse racing sector creates employment to 40.000 families (160.000 people) both directly and indirectly. Turkey is one of the 10 countries contributing to employment most in horse racing and breeding sector.

With the opportunities Jockey Club of Turkey creates:

- 5.215 horse owners
- 4490 grooms
- 432 jockeys, 660 apprentices and 86 amateur riders
- 1564 trainers
- 11.200 betting shop workers (2.800 betting shops x 4)
- 2.000 TJK personnel
- Numerous vets, medicine/forage/item suppliers, farriers, forwarders, press members and state facility workers are employed.

== Horse Population ==
There were approximately 300 thoroughbred race horses in Turkey in the 1950s, however today there are:

- 750 stallions
- 3350 brood mares
- 6950 peers
- 5250 racing horse and totally 16.500 active thoroughbred English and Arabian horses. It is known that there are 31.641 recorded English and Arabian horses across the country.

== Current Situation of Horse Races in Turkey ==
The Ottoman Jockey Club was founded in 1909 with the name of ‘’Jockey Club of Ottoman’’. It's been stated that Ottoman Jockey Club had the purpose of controlling the horse races at the racetrack under the auspices of the Sultan and breed thorough bred English and Arabian horses. In 1912 Society of Improving Horse Breed started conducting races at Veliefendi. In 1920 an English company started conducting races at Veliefendi. Those races continued until 1922. In 1920, under the auspices of Mustafa Kemal Pasha TBMM organized races in Ankara. Between 1923 and 1926 various races were held in Istanbul. In 1927 with the attendance of Mustafa Kemal, Gazi Derby to which thoroughbreds could join. The first race with cup was held under the name of ‘’Presidency Race Cup’’ in 1939. In 1953 Jockey Club received the name of Jockey Club of Turkey. Since then, races have been continuing.

Synchronously with the development of Jockey Club of Turkey, modern horse races and horse race sector gained a big leap every year domestically and internationally. While horse races were being held in 3 racecourses in 1926, today 9 racecourses, television channels, printed and electronic publications and latest technology of the field serve to the sector.

== Presidents of TJK ==
No.	Name (Birth-Death)	Service Period	
No.	Name (Birth-Death)	Start of Service	End of Service
1	Fevzi Lutfi Karaosmanoglu (1900-1938)	1950	1956
2	Ethem Menderes (1899-1992)	1956	1956
3	Fehmi Simsaroglu	1960	1960
4	Fikret Yuzatli	1960	1961
5	Vehbi Koc (1901-1996)	1961	1961
6	Kâzım Köylü	1962	1962
7	Sahir Kurutluoglu (1910-1992)	1962	1966
8	Ozdemir Atman	1967	1968
9	Burhan Karamehmet	1969	1972
10	Sadun Atığ	1972	1975
11	Zuhtu Erisen	1975	1975
12	A.Cemal Kura	1976	1978
(10)	Sadun Atıg	1979	1980
13	Basri Karabucak	1980	1982
14	Nail Avunduk	1982	1984
15	Kenan Binak	1984	1985
(12)	A.Cemal Kura	1985	1987
(8)	Ozdemir Atman	1987	1990
(15)	Kenan Binak	1990	1990
16	Orhan D. Ozsoy	1990	1992
17	Hazım Gozlukcu	1992	1995
18	Ali Dogan Unlu	1995	1996
19	Tali Calbatur	1996	1997
20	Muammer Kitapci	1997	1998
(17)	Hazım Gozlukcu	1998	1999
21	Ömer Faruk Girgin	1999	2004
22	Umur Tamer	2004	2007
23	Yasin Kadri Ekinci	2007	2009
24	Behcet Homurlu	2009	2011
21	Omer Faruk Girgin	2011	2012
25	Serdal Adali	2012	2015
23	Yasin Kadri Ekinci	2015	-
