= Beştepe, Yenimahalle =

Beştepe
- Neighbourhood
- Location in Turkey Beştepe (Turkey Central Anatolia)
- Coordinates: 39°55′12″N 32°48′0″E
- Country: Turkey
- Province: Ankara
- District: Yenimahalle

Government
  - Muhtar: Hatice İzmirli
- Population (2022): 12,066
- Time zone: UTC+3 (TRT)

Beştepe is a neighbourhood in the municipality and district of Yenimahalle, Ankara Province, Turkey. Its population is 12,066 (2022). It is home to the Presidential Complex of Turkey. Its muhtar is Hatice İzmirli.

== Demographics ==
Historical population
Year	Pop.	±% p.a.
2007	9,818	—
2012	11,954	+4.02%
2017	12,324	+0.61%
2022	12,066	−0.42%
Source: TÜIK (2007-2022)
