= Ribella =

Irish-bred Thoroughbred racehorse

Ribella is a champion horse race (mare) born in Ireland. She raced in Turkey. She has won the greatest races in Turkey and is considered one of the most popular horses in the country.

== Achievements ==
=== 2001 ===
- A Maiden 1st
- Handicap 15 1st
- Joe Clarke (L)2nd
- Piri Reis (L) 3rd

=== 2002 ===
- Efes (L) 2nd
- Cantatrice(L) 1st
- Ayizi (L) 1st
- Fehmi Simsaroglu (G3) 1st
- Filly Trial (G1) 2nd
- Mare Trial (G1) 1st
- Anafartalar (G2) 2nd

=== 2003 ===
- Listed 4th

=== 2004 ===
- Listed 3rd
- Fikret Yüzatli (G3) 4th
- Ethem Menderes (G3) 2nd
- İsmet İnonu (G1) 1st
- Zübeyde Hanım (G2) 1st
- Prime Ministry Cup (G1) 4th
- Fatih Sultan Mehmet (G1) 5th
- Topkapı Trophy (G2) 3rd
- G3 3rd
- International Anatolia Cup (G2) 1st
- Vehbi Koc (G3) 1st
- Fetih (G3) 2nd

=== 2005 ===
- Dubai Daad al Shaba 1 Cuped Trial 1st
- Zubeyde Hanim (G2) 1st
- International Adnan Menderes Cup (G2) 3rd
- Prime Ministry Cup (G1) 1st
- Fatih Sultan Mehmet (G1) 1st
- Topkapı Trophy (G2) 4th
- TJK Cup (G1) 2nd
- Fevzi Çakmak (G2) 2nd
- International Anatolia Cup (G2) 1st

=== 2006 ===
- IBB Cup (G3)2nd
- Ismet Inonu (G2)2nd
- Zubeyde Hanım (G2) 1st
- Adnan Menderes (G2) 2nd
- International Topkapi Trophy (G2) 1st with a massed sprint. She was 200 m back from the 1st. Last 100 m she sprinted and won on the photo.
- Marmara Trophy (G3)1st
- International Anatolia Cup (G2) 1st
- Atıf Esenbel (G3) 1st

=== 2007 ===
- Ismet Inonu Cup (G2) 1st
- Zubeyde Hanim Cup (G2) 2nd
- Prime Ministry Cup (G1) 3rd
- Topkapı Trophy (G1)2nd
- Orhan Doga Ozsoy Cup(G3) 1st
- International Anatolia Cup (G2)1st

=== 2008 ===
- Şadi Eliyeşil(L)1st
- Zubeyde Hanım Cup (G2)1st
- Prime Ministry Cup (G1)4th
