= Toormore =

Thoroughbred racehorse

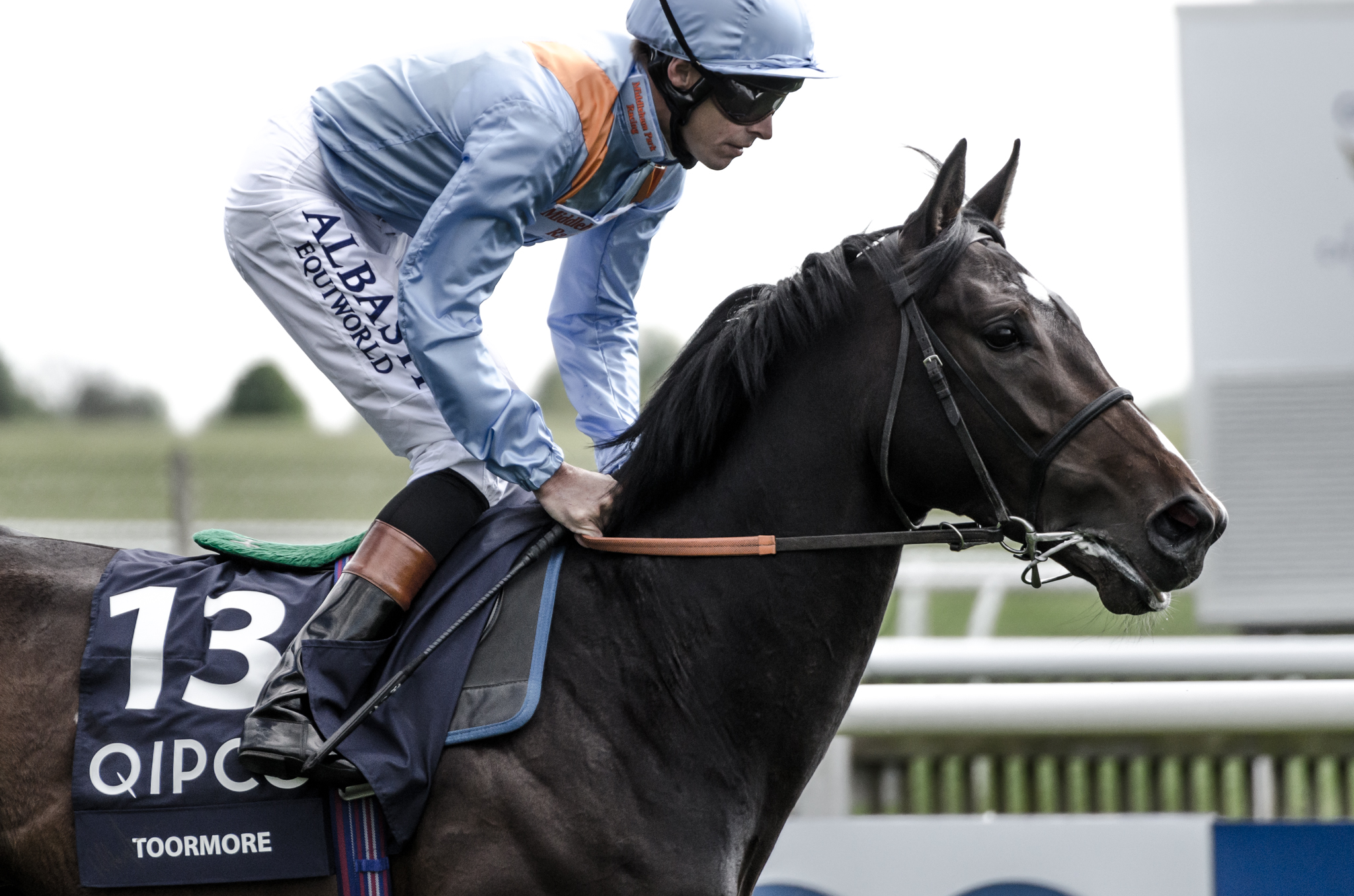
- Toormore at the 2014 2000 Guineas.
- Sire: Arakan
- Grandsire: Nureyev
- Dam: Danetime Out
- Damsire: Danetime
- Sex: Colt
- Foaled: 19 March 2011
- Country: Ireland
- Colour: Bay
- Breeder: BEC Bloodstock
- Owner: Middleham Park Racing IX & James Pak; Godolphin
- Trainer: Richard Hannon Sr. Richard Hannon Jr.
- Record: 22: 7-2-3
- Earnings: £1,051,696

Major wins
- Vintage Stakes (2013); Vincent O'Brien National Stakes (2013); Craven Stakes (2014); Lennox Stakes (2015); International Topkapi Trophy (2015); Bet365 Mile (2016)

Awards
- Champion European two-year-old (2013)
- Last updated on 27 August 2016

Toormore (19 March 2011 – 22 February 2018) was an Irish-bred British-trained Thoroughbred racehorse. He was the champion two-year-old in Europe in 2013 when he was undefeated in all his races including the Vintage Stakes and Vincent O'Brien National Stakes. In 2014 he won the Craven Stakes and finished third in the Queen Elizabeth II Stakes for his 7 middleham Park racing syndicate owners, Mr James Pak, Miss Lynn Douglas, Mr Peter Barker, Mr Tony Denham, Mr Keith Denham, Mr Danny Nundram & Mr Steve Studley. He returned in 2015 and was then sold to Darley Stud July 2015 for future stallion duties, going onto win the Lennox Stakes and the International Topkapi Trophy for Godolphin. In 2016 he recorded another major win in the Bet365 Mile. He was retired to stand as a stallion at the end of the 2016 season but returned to training early in 2018. He suffered a fatal injury on the gallops in Dubai 22 February 2018.

== Background ==
Toormore was a bay horse with a white star and snip bred in Ireland by BEC Bloodstock. His sire, Arakan, was an American-bred horse who raced in Europe, winning the Criterion Stakes in 2004 and the Supreme Stakes in 2005. Apart from Toormore, the best of his progeny has been the Prix Jean Prat winner Dick Turpin. Toormore was the fourth foal of the unraced mare Danetime Out. a descendant of the broodmare Blue Sash and a distant relative of the 1000 Guineas winner Mrs McArdy.

As a yearling, Toormore was sent to the Doncaster Bloodstock Sale where he was sold for 36,000 guineas. He entered the ownership of Middleham Park Racing IX & James Pak, The syndicate owners are James Pak, Keith and Tony Denham, Lynn Douglas, Steve Studley, Peter Barker, Brian Palmer and Danny Nundram. He was sent into training with Richard Hannon Sr. at East Everleigh in Wiltshire. He was ridden in most of his early races by Richard Hughes in the light blue and orange silks of Middleham Park Racing.

== Racing career ==
=== 2013: two-year-old season ===
Toormore made his racecourse debut in a maiden race over six furlongs at Leicester Racecourse on 28 May. Starting the 5/2 joint-favourite in a field of twelve runners he took the lead approaching the final furlong and won by a neck from Ertijaal, with a gap of seven lengths back to Major Crispies in third. More than two months later, Toormore returned for the Group Two Vintage Stakes over seven furlongs at Goodwood Racecourse and was made the 5/4 favourite ahead of Parbold, a colt who had finished second to War Command in the Coventry Stakes. He was restrained by Hughes in the early stages before accelerating inside the final furlong to catch Outstrip in the final strides to win by a neck. On 15 September, Toormore was sent to Ireland to contest the Group One Vincent O'Brien National Stakes over seven furlongs at the Curragh Racecourse. He started favourite in a field of five runners, with his main opposition appearing to come from Sudirman, who had beaten War Command into third place in the Phoenix Stakes. Toormore led from the start and drew away in the final furlong to win by two and three quarter lengths from Sudirman with Giovanni Boldini in third. Despite reports that the colt would run in the Racing Post Trophy, Toormore did not run again in 2013. His form was boosted, however, by the performances of the horses he had beaten: War Command won the Dewhurst Stakes, whilst Outstrip and Giovanni Boldini finished first and second in the Breeders' Cup Juvenile Turf.

In the official ratings published in January 2014, Toormore was rated the best European two-year-old of 2013, two pounds ahead of the Cartier Award winner Kingston Hill.

=== 2014: three-year-old season ===
On 17 April at Newmarket Toormore made his three-year-old debut when he started even money favourite for the Craven Stakes, a trial race for the 2000 Guineas. Ridden by Ryan Moore, he took the lead approaching the final furlong and won by two lengths from The Grey Gatsby. On 3 May, Toormore started the 15/2 third favourite, behind Kingman and Australia for the 2000 Guineas over the Rowley Mile course at Newmarket on 3 May. He was among the leaders from the start, but began to struggle a furlong from the finish and eventually finished sixth behind his stable companion Night of Thunder. Toormore started 7/1 third favourite behind Kingman and Night of Thunder for the St James's Palace Stakes at Royal Ascot, but ran poorly, weakening in the closing stages to finish sixth of the seven runners. On 29 July, Toormore was dropped in class and started the 5/6 favourite for the Group Two Lennox Stakes over seven furlongs at Goodwood Racecourse. Ridden by Hughes, took the lead approaching the final furlong but was overtaken in the closing stages and beaten a neck by the five-year-old Es Que Love.

In September, Toormore was sent to Turkey for the International Topkapi Trophy over one mile at Veliefendi Racecourse. He started the 1/5 favourite but finished third behind the other British runners Glory Awaits and Our Channel. On 18 October, the colt started a 25/1 outsider for the Queen Elizabeth II Stakes at Ascot Racecourse. He fought the attempts of his jockey Kieren Fallon to restrain him and dropped back into last place with two furlongs to run before finishing strongly to take third place behind Charm Spirit and Night of Thunder.

=== 2015: four-year-old season ===
Toormore made his first appearance of the year, in the Lockinge Stakes on the straight mile course at Newbury on 16 May. He tracked the leaders in the early stages before staying on strongly to finish second of the sixteen runners, a neck behind Night of Thunder. In the Queen Anne Stakes at Royal Ascot he led for most of the way before being overtaken in the final furlong and finishing fourth of the eight runners behind Solow. In July, Toormore was dropped in class and distance for a second attempt at the Lennox Stakes and started the 9/4 joint-favourite with the three-year-old Dutch Connection, the winner of the Jersey Stakes. Ridden by James Doyle, he led from the start and stayed on well when challenged in the last quarter mile to win by three quarters of a length from Dutch Connection and Safety Check. Toormore was then sent to France for the Prix Jacques Le Marois at Deauville Racecourse where he started 5/1 second favourite and finished fifth behind the five-year-old mare Esoterique after leading until the last 400 metres.

In September, Toormore was again sent to Turkey for a second attempt at the International Topkapi Trophy. He started odds-on favourite and won by two and a half lengths from the locally trained Perfect Warrior. Toormore returned to Europe for the Prix de la Forêt over 1400 metres at Longchamp Racecourse on 4 October. He took the lead in the straight but was overtaken 200 metres out and finished third of the thirteen runners behind Make Believe and Limato. On his final appearance of the season he was sent to Sha Tin Racecourse for the Hong Kong Mile on 13 December and finished unplaced behind Maurice.

=== 2016: five-year-old season ===
On his first appearance as a five-year-old Toormore contested the Group Two Bet365 Mile at Sandown Park on 22 April when he was ridden for the first time by William Buick. He started as the 7/2 second favourite behind Belardo whilst the other runners included Dutch Connection (Jersey Stakes), Adaay (2015 Hungerford Stakes), Breton Rock (2014 Hungerford Stakes) and Gabrial (Lincoln Handicap). He raced in second place until the last quarter mile and then got the better of a sustained struggle with Dutch Connection to win by a neck. In his next two races he was moved back into the highest class and performed creditably in defeat as he finished fifth to Belardo in the Lockinge Stakes and fourth to the American mare Tepin in the Queen Anne Stakes. He failed to win or place in four subsequent starts and was retired from racing at the end of the year.

== Stud career and death ==
Toormore was retired to become a breeding stallion at the Darley But was taken off the stud's roster in February 2017. Later that year he was gelded and sent back into training with Charlie Appleby. While training in Dubai on 22 February 2018 he sustained a serious injury and was euthanised. Tim Palin of Middleham Park said "Toormore was an absolute legend of a horse for us as he cost only 36,000gns and went on to become champion 2-year-old in 2013, when he was competing with all the bluebloods. He was a real game-changer for Middleham Park as we became 50% bigger as an operation because of him. He's been a hard act to follow as to get another one like him on our budget is nigh on impossible these days".

== Pedigree ==
Pedigree of Toormore, bay colt, 2011
| Sire Arakan (USA) 2000 | Nureyev (USA); 1977 | Northern Dancer | Nearctic |
| Sire Arakan (USA) 2000 | Nureyev (USA); 1977 | Northern Dancer | Natalma |
| Sire Arakan (USA) 2000 | Nureyev (USA); 1977 | Special | Forli |
| Sire Arakan (USA) 2000 | Nureyev (USA); 1977 | Special | Thong |
| Sire Arakan (USA) 2000 | Far Across (GB); 1996 | Common Grounds | Kris |
| Sire Arakan (USA) 2000 | Far Across (GB); 1996 | Common Grounds | Sweetly |
| Sire Arakan (USA) 2000 | Far Across (GB); 1996 | City Ex | Ardross |
| Sire Arakan (USA) 2000 | Far Across (GB); 1996 | City Ex | Rhythmique |
| Dam Danetime Out (IRE) 2003 | Danetime (IRE); 1995 | Danehill | Danzig |
| Dam Danetime Out (IRE) 2003 | Danetime (IRE); 1995 | Danehill | Razyana |
| Dam Danetime Out (IRE) 2003 | Danetime (IRE); 1995 | Allegheny River | Lear Fan |
| Dam Danetime Out (IRE) 2003 | Danetime (IRE); 1995 | Allegheny River | Allesheny |
| Dam Danetime Out (IRE) 2003 | Matila (IRE); 1990 | Persian Bold | Bold Lad (IRE) |
| Dam Danetime Out (IRE) 2003 | Matila (IRE); 1990 | Persian Bold | Relkarunner |
| Dam Danetime Out (IRE) 2003 | Matila (IRE); 1990 | Peace Girl | Dominion |
| Dam Danetime Out (IRE) 2003 | Matila (IRE); 1990 | Peace Girl | Olderfleet (Family:14-b) |
