= Gazi Race =

Gazi Race Gazi Koşusu
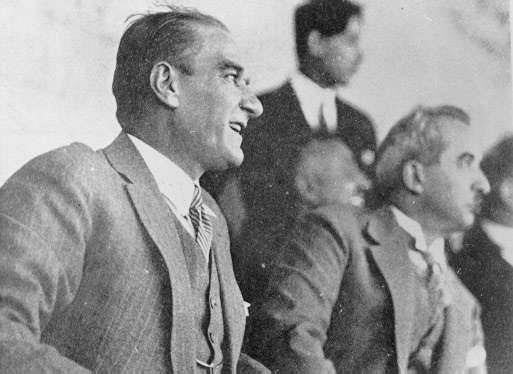
- Atatürk and İsmet İnönü watching the first Gazi Race together
- Class: Thoroughbred horse flat
- Location: Veliefendi Race Course, Zeytinburnu, Istanbul, Turkey
- Inaugurated: 10 June 1927; 99 years ago
- Race type: Thoroughbred - Flat racing

Race information
- Distance: 2,400 m (2,600 yd)
- Surface: Turf (grass) track
- Track: right-handed
- Qualification: Three-year-olds
- Purse: TL 50,000,000
- Bonuses: TL 26,250,000 conditional to the winner

The Gazi Race (Turkish: Gazi Koşusu), also known as the Gazi Derby, is a Turkish thoroughbred horse flat race that is established in honor of the founder of the Turkish Republic Gazi Mustafa Kemal. It is country's most prestigious horse racing event, which is held uninterruptedly since its establishment in 1927. Restricted to 22 three-year-old thoroughbred horses, it is raced clockwise at a distance of 2,400 m (2,600 yd) on turf (grass) track at the Veliefendi Race Course in Istanbul. The 100th and most recent of the race held on 28 June 2026, was won by a thoroughbred named Bay Nalçakan, ridden by jockey Halis Karataş, who had previously won the race six times, in 1996, 2005, 2006, 2011, 2012 and 2014.

== History ==
Mustafa Kemal, founder of the Turkish Republic, was honored with the title Ghazi (Turkish: Gazi) in 1923 by the Turkish Grand National Assembly due to his successful command at the Turkish War of Independence. He used this title until 1934, when he was given the surname "Atatürk" (literally: Father of Turks) following the adoption of the Surname Law.

A fan of horse racing, Gazi Mustafa Kemal said "Horse racing is the social need for modern societies". He organized horse races even during the years of the War of Independence in Ankara, in the new capital of modern Turkey.

The first officially organized horse racing was run on 10 June 1927 in Ankara by British bred horses without age restriction over a distance of 2,000 m (2,200 yd). The money award was TL 2,000. The winner was jockey İhsan Atçı with racehorse "Neriman" owned by Ali Muhiddin Hacı Bekir, member of a renowned candy producing dynasty.

In 1928, the event was run as an open race restricted to age and weight. Succeeding Turkish presidents, Celal Bayar in 1929 with "Cap Gris Nez" and İsmet İnönü in 1930 with "Olgo", were also among the winners of the Gazi Race.

In 1932, the race was restricted to British thoroughbred three-year-old horses born in Turkey and was run over a distance of 2,400 yd (2,200 m). The prize was set to TL 5,000. In 1936, Gazi Race was held in the Ankara City Race Course (Ankara Şehir Hipodromu) constructed next to the Ankara 19 Mayıs Stadium.

Whenever Atatürk was in Ankara, he enjoyed to observe horse racing. In 1938, the race was renamed "Atatürk Race". Since its inauguration, the event is held every year without interruption. Gazi Race was transferred in 1968 from Ankara to Istanbul's Veliefendi Race Course.

== Award ==
The winner of the race receives a purse in amount of TL 50,000,000, while the second, third, fourth, and fifth-place finishers receive TL 20,000,000, TL 10,000,000, TL 5,000,000, and TL 2,500,000 respectively. In addition, a bonus payment totaling to about TL 26,250,000 is given for breeding and enrollment expenses. Since 1970, a solid silver trophy in form of an equestrian statue depicting Gazi Mustafa Kemal is bestowed by the Turkish president. It was created by sculptor Mehmet Şadi Çalık (1917–1979).

== Records ==
Record holder of the Gazi Race is the thoroughbred horse "Bold Pilot" owned by Özdemir Atman that was run by jockey Halis Karataş at a time of 2.26.22 in 1996.

Racehorse owner and breeder Sadık Eliyeşil (1925–2008) holds the record for the most wins in the Gazi Race with 13 titles:

Year	Racehorse
1950	Darling
1953	Kusun
1961	Atlıhan
1963	Melikşah
1964	Kayarlı
1971	Minimo
1972	Akkor
1973	Karayel
1976	Buğra
1982	Toraman
1984	Cartagena
1986	Hafız
2005	Popular Demand

Mümin Çılgın (born 1935) is the most successful jockey of the Gazi Race with nine wins:

Year	Racehorse
1960	Helene De Troia
1965	Apaçi
1974	Nadas
1979	Dr. Seferof
1981	Dersim
1985	Uğurtay
1986	Hafız
1988	Top Image
1991	Abbas
