= Veliefendi Race Course =

Horse racing track in Istanbul, Turkey

Coordinates: 40.98709°N 28.88881°E

Veliefendi Race Course Veliefendi Hipodromu
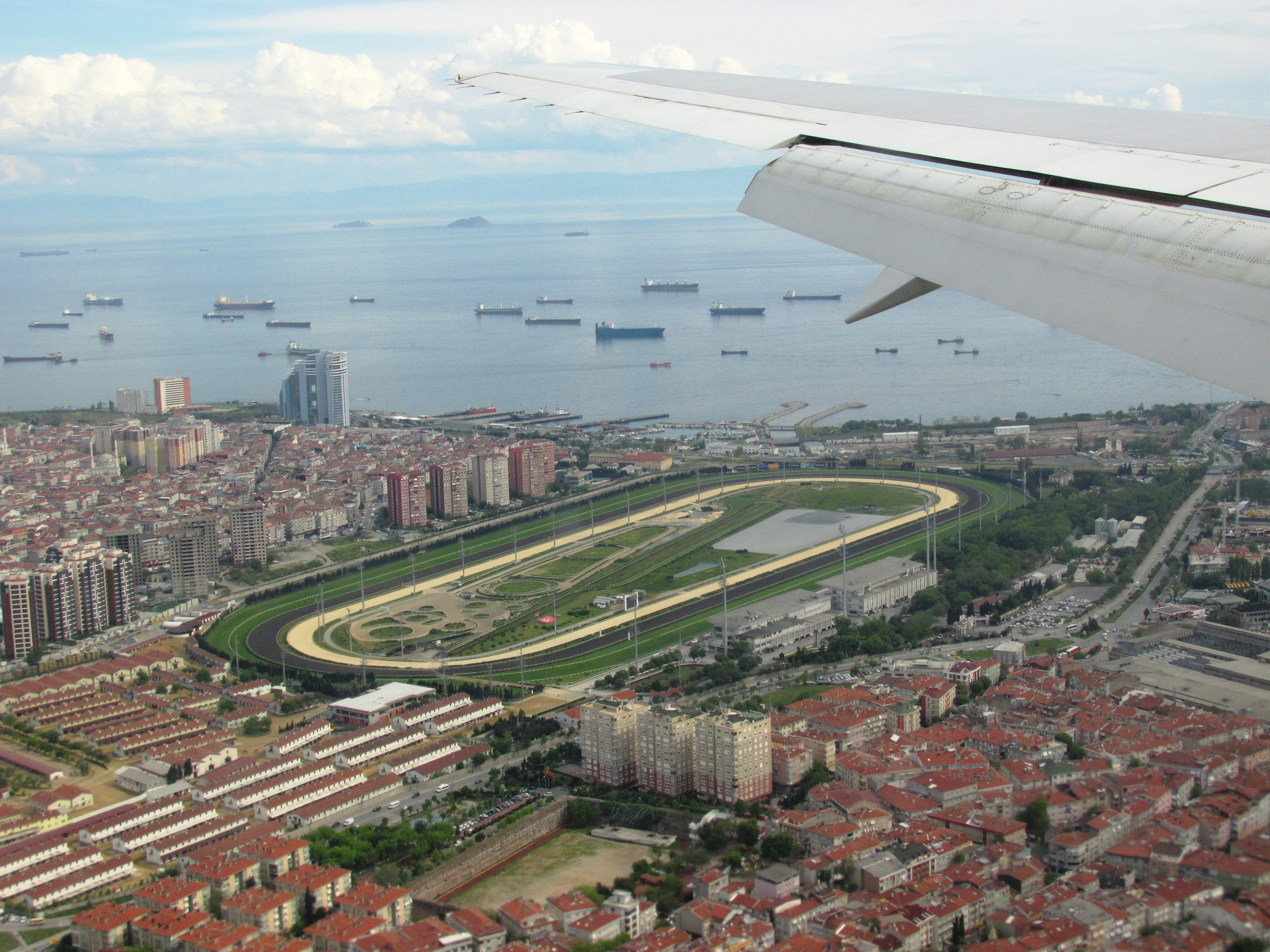
- Interactive map of Veliefendi Race Course; Veliefendi Hipodromu
- Location: Veliefendi, Bakırköy, Istanbul, Turkey
- Owned by: Jockey Club of Turkey (TJK)
- Date opened: 1913; 113 years ago
- Screened on: TJK TV
- Course type: Flat/Thoroughbred
- Notable races: Gazi Race (since 1927); Prime Minister's Race (since 1951)

Veliefendi Race Course (Turkish: Veliefendi Hipodromu) is a horse racing track located at Veliefendi neighborhood in Bakırköy district of Istanbul, Turkey.

It is the country's oldest and biggest race course founded on a former grassland that was historically a farm belonging to Şeyhülislam Veliyyüddin Efendi, an 18th-century superior authority of Islam in the Ottoman Empire. The race course was constructed in the years 1912/13 by German specialists upon the initiative of Enver Pasha.

The race course hosts also music events. In 2006, Turkish pop singer Nez held a concert.

== Physical attributes ==
The race course covers an area of 59.6 ha (147 acres) consisting of facilities for racing, training and barns. The race course has three interleaved tracks as:

- a 2,020 m (2,210 yd) long and 27–36 m (89–118 ft) wide turf oval,
- a 1,870 m (2,050 yd) long and 17.5–19 m (57–62 ft) wide synthetic track for all-weather racing and
- a 1,730 m (1,890 yd) long and 16–17 m (52–56 ft) wide sand oval for training.

The track's seating capacity is 7,600. The complex comprises offices, a museum, an exhibition hall, a racehorse hospital, an apprentice training center as well as social and recreational facilities.

== Major races ==
- Gazi Race (Gazi Koşusu), is the most prestigious Turkish Oaks, and is held since 1927 in memory of Mustafa Kemal Atatürk, who was awarded the honorific title "Gazi" (Ghazi). Initially run in Ankara, the event was later transferred to Veliefendi Race Course. The award is about TL 1.4 million (approx. US$850,000 as of June 2011), and since 1970 is accompanied with a silver equestrian statue of Atatürk.
- Prime Minister's Race (Başbaşkanlık Koşusu) is a Turkish Oaks held since 1951. The winner is awarded TL 1,105,000 (approx. US$330,000 as of July 2018) and a trophy bestowed by the Turkish prime minister.

== Incidents ==
During a race on July 31, 1949, four race horses, including two favourite horses, did not leave the starting gate upon the referee's start sign, and were disqualified. The bettors protested against a possible swindle by the referees and the racehorse owners, and demanded a rerun. As the referee commission rejected the demand, the crowd set the referee tower, the bleachers, the administration and box offices on fire.

In July 1953, bettors threw stones towards horsemen and beat a jockey named Muhacir Ahmet (literally: Ahmet The Immigrant) whom they believed to have swindled. Two years later local newspapers published news about swindles at Veliefendi Race Course, and during a race on July 13, 1955, the bettors stoned the administration building, and Muhacir Ahmet was beaten once again.

In 2008, the track held its first-ever farewell ceremony for a racehorse, honoring Ribella, a popular mare.
