= 2011 2000 Guineas Stakes =

- 2000 Guineas Stakes
- Racing colours of the winner
- Location: Newmarket Racecourse
- Date: 30 April 2011
- Winning horse: Frankel
- Starting price: 1/2 fav
- Jockey: Tom Queally
- Trainer: Henry Cecil
- Owner: Khalid Abdulla
- Conditions: Good to firm

The 2011 2000 Guineas Stakes was the 203rd running of the 2000 Guineas Stakes horse race. It was run over one mile at Newmarket Racecourse on 30 April 2011.

This race was the sixth of Frankel's unbeaten 14 race winning streak, his second win as a 3-year-old and his second Group 1 victory, following his victory in the Dewhurst Stakes at the same racecourse in 2010.

Rerouted was entered into the race primarily to act as a pacemaker to the highly promising Frankel, however with Frankel being drawn in stall number one and Rerouted in stall number thirteen, the opposite side of the Rowley Mile racecourse at Newmarket, the pacemaking job was almost rendered obsolete.

Such was Frankel's pace that he drew clear from the field from the off. Where some may have considered it a risk for jockey Tom Queally to allow Frankel to set his own pace, it became clear that Frankel was a very special horse on this day as he quickly established a lead and won the race.

== Race details ==
- Sponsor: QIPCO
- Winner's prize money: £198,695
- Going: Good to firm
- Number of runners: 13
- Winner's time: 1 minute, 37.30 seconds

== Full result ==
| | Dist * | Horse | Jockey | Trainer | SP |
| 1 | | Frankel | Tom Queally | Henry Cecil | 1/2 fav |
| 2 | 6 | Dubawi Gold | Richard Hughes | Richard Hannon Sr. | 33/1 |
| 3 | ½ | Native Khan | Olivier Peslier | Ed Dunlop | 16/1 |
| 4 | 11 | Slim Shadey | Luke Morris | Stan Moore | 200/1 |
| 5 | ½ | Fury | Johnny Murtagh | William Haggas | 12/1 |
| 6 | 5 | Happy Today | Martin Dwyer | Brian Meehan | 100/1 |
| 7 | 3 | Pathfork | Fran Berry | Jessica Harrington | 8/1 |
| 8 | ½ | Rerouted | Richard Hills | Barry Hills | 66/1 |
| 9 | 1¼ | Loving Spirit | Robert Havlin | James Toller | 66/1 |
| 10 | 8 | Casamento | Frankie Dettori | Mahmood Al Zarooni | 11/1 |
| 11 | 2 | Roderic O'Connor | Ryan Moore | Aidan O'Brien | 8/1 |
| 12 | 14 | Saamidd | Mickael Barzalona | Saeed bin Suroor | 22/1 |
| 13 | 11 | Broox | William Buick | Eoghan O'Neill | 100/1 |

* The distances between the horses are shown in lengths

== Winner details ==
Further details of the winner, Frankel:

- Foaled: 11 February 2008, in Great Britain
- Sire: Galileo; Dam: Kind (Danehill)
- Owner: Khalid Abdulla
- Breeder: Juddmonte Farms

== Form analysis ==
=== Two-year-old races ===
Notable runs by the future 2000 Guineas participants as two-year-olds in 2010:

- Frankel – 1st in Royal Lodge Stakes, Dewhurst Stakes
- Dubawi Gold – 2nd in Woodcote Stakes, 10th in Norfolk Stakes, 11th in Gimcrack Stakes, 9th in Racing Post Trophy
- Native Khan – 1st in Solario Stakes, 4th in Racing Post Trophy
- Slim Shadey – 6th in Chesham Stakes, 2nd in Washington Singer Stakes, 5th in Royal Lodge Stakes
- Pathfork – 1st in Futurity Stakes, 1st in Vincent O'Brien National Stakes
- Rerouted – 1st in Somerville Tattersall Stakes, 4th in Critérium International
- Casamento – 2nd in Vincent O'Brien National Stakes, 1st in Beresford Stakes, 1st in Racing Post Trophy
- Roderic O'Connor – 2nd in Dewhurst Stakes, 1st in Critérium International
- Saamidd – 1st in Champagne Stakes, 6th in Dewhurst Stakes
- Broox – 2nd in Prix Robert Papin, 4th in Prix Morny, 1st in Prix d'Arenberg, 9th in Critérium de Maisons-Laffitte

=== The road to Newmarket ===
Early-season appearances in 2011, prior to running in the 2000 Guineas:

- Frankel – 1st in Greenham Stakes
- Dubawi Gold – 1st in Lingfield Spring Cup, 1st in Lingfield International Trial Stakes
- Native Khan – 1st in Craven Stakes
- Happy Today – 2nd in Feilden Stakes
- Rerouted – 2nd in European Free Handicap

=== Subsequent Group 1 wins ===
Group 1 victories after running in the 2000 Guineas:

- Frankel – St James's Palace Stakes (2011), Sussex Stakes (2011, 2012), Queen Elizabeth II Stakes (2011), Lockinge Stakes (2012), Queen Anne Stakes (2012), International Stakes (2012), Champion Stakes (2012)
- Roderic O'Connor – Irish 2000 Guineas
