= 2012 Champion Stakes =

Horse race in England

- Champion Stakes
- Racing colours of the winner
- Location: Ascot Racecourse
- Date: 20 October 2012
- Winning horse: Frankel
- Starting price: 2/11 fav
- Jockey: Tom Queally
- Trainer: Sir Henry Cecil
- Owner: Khalid Abdulla
- Conditions: Soft

The 2012 Champion Stakes was the 136th running of the Champion Stakes horse race. It was run over one mile and two furlongs at Ascot Racecourse on 20 October 2012.

== Race details ==
- Sponsor: QIPCO
- Winner's prize money: £737,230
- Going: Soft
- Number of runners: 6
- Winner's time: 2 minutes, 10.22 seconds

== Full result ==
	Dist *	Horse	Jockey	Trainer	SP
1		Frankel	Tom Queally	Sir Henry Cecil	2/11 fav
2	1¾	Cirrus des Aigles	Olivier Peslier	Corine Barande-Barbe	9/2
3	2½	Nathaniel	William Buick	John Gosden	9/1
4	3½	Pastorius	Frankie Dettori	Mario Hofer	33/1
5	4	Master of Hounds	Ryan Moore	William Haggas	80/1
6	2½	Bullet Train	Ian Mongan	Sir Henry Cecil	100/1

* The distances between the horses are shown in lengths

== Winner details ==
Further details of the winner, Frankel:

- Foaled: 11 February 2008, in Great Britain
- Sire: Galileo; Dam: Kind (Danehill)
- Owner: Khalid Abdulla
- Breeder: Juddmonte Farms

== Form analysis ==
=== Previous Group 1 wins ===
Group 1 victories prior to running in the 2012 Champion Stakes:

- Frankel – Dewhurst Stakes (2010), 2000 Guineas Stakes (2011), St James's Palace Stakes (2011), Sussex Stakes (2011, 2012), Queen Elizabeth II Stakes (2011), Lockinge Stakes (2012), Queen Anne Stakes (2012), International Stakes (2012)
- Cirrus des Aigles – Champion Stakes (2011), Dubai Sheema Classic (2012), Prix Ganay (2012)
- Nathaniel – King George VI and Queen Elizabeth Stakes (2011), Eclipse Stakes (2012)
- Pastorius – Deutsches Derby (2012), Bayerisches Zuchtrennen (2012)
- Master of Hounds – Jebel Hatta (2012)

=== Subsequent Group 1 wins ===
Group 1 victories after running in the Champion Stakes:

- Pastorius – Prix Ganay (2013)
- Cirrus des Aigles – Prix Ganay (2014, 2015), Prix d'Ispahan (2014), Coronation Cup (2014)
