= Tom Queally =

Irish jockey

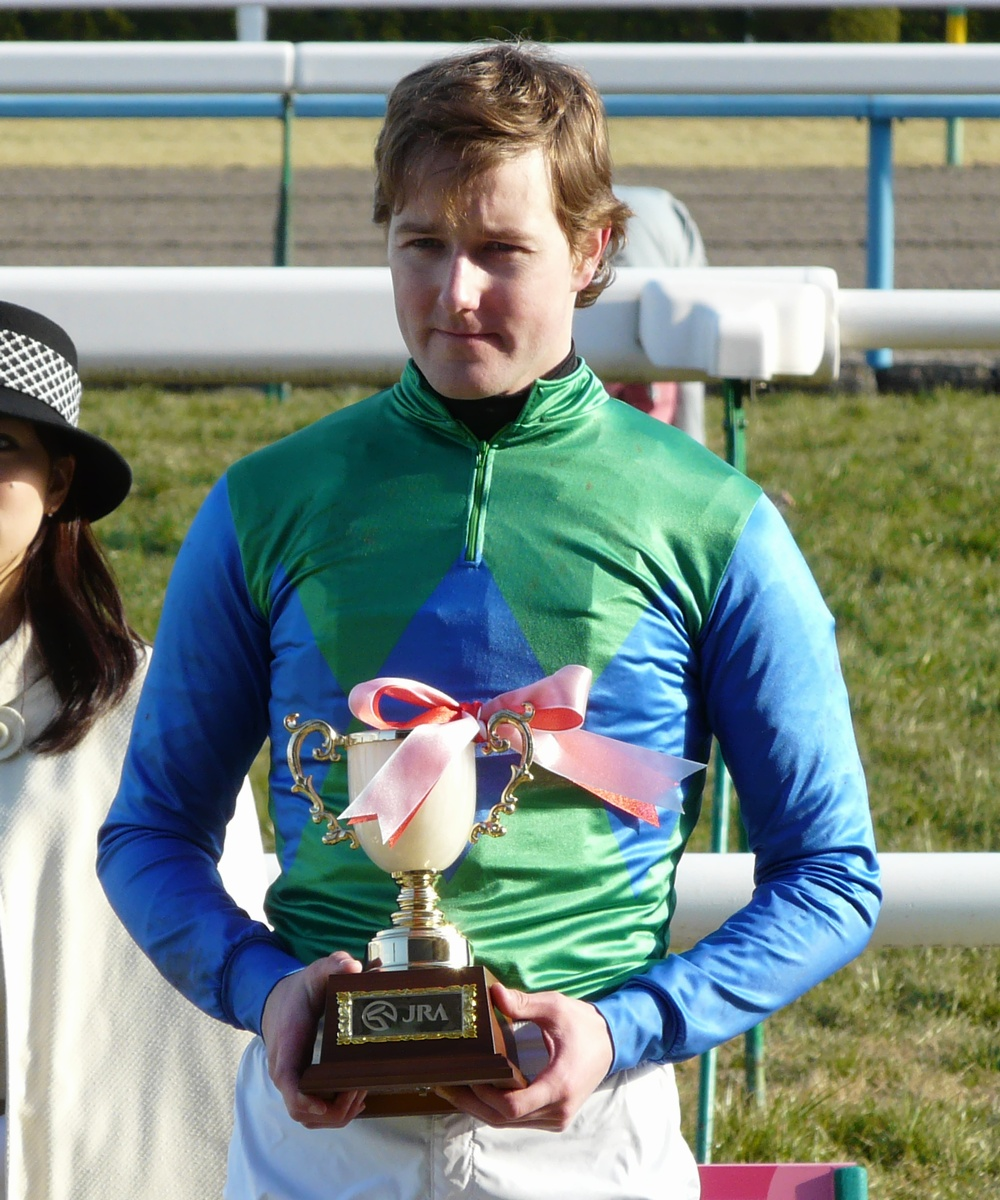

Personal information
- Born: 8 October 1984 (age 41) Dungarvan, County Waterford, Ireland
- Occupation: Jockey

Horse racing career
- Sport: Horse racing
- Career wins: 1211 (GB only) (Note: As of 20 June 2024.)

Major racing wins
- Diamond Jubilee Stakes (2009, 2017); July Cup (2009); Nassau Stakes (2009, 2010); Champion Stakes (2009, 2010, 2012); Eclipse Stakes (2010); Yorkshire Oaks (2010); Prix Vermeille (2010); Dewhurst Stakes (2010); 2,000 Guineas Stakes (2011); St. James's Palace Stakes (2011); Falmouth Stakes (2011); Sussex Stakes (2011, 2012); Queen Elizabeth II Stakes (2011); Lockinge Stakes (2012); Queen Anne Stakes (2012); International Stakes (2012); Matron Stakes (2012); Breeders' Cup wins: Breeders' Cup Filly & Mare Turf (2009)

Racing awards
- Irish flat racing Champion Apprentice (2000); British flat racing Champion Apprentice (2004); Lester Award (2004, 2009)

Significant horses
- Frankel, Midday, Twice Over

Tom Queally (born 8 October 1984) is an Irish flat racing jockey based in Britain. He rode Frankel in his unbeaten 14-race career.

== Background ==
Born Thomas P. Queally in Dungarvan, County Waterford, Ireland, Queally is the son of trainer Declan Queally. He was a pony racing champion before being apprenticed to trainer Pat Flynn. He recorded his first win as a jockey on Larifaari at Clonmel aged 15 on 13 April 2000 and was crowned Irish champion apprentice just days after his sixteenth birthday later that season. His parents then insisted he completed his schooling at Dungarvon Christian Brothers School before joining the yard of the leading Irish trainer Aidan O'Brien.

== Riding career ==
=== Apprenticeship ===
Queally achieved his first Group race success on 13 April 2003 when riding Balestrini for O'Brien in the Group 3 Ballysax Stakes. Balestrini, a 33-1 outsider, was the pacemaker for odds-on favourite Alberto Giacometti, but beat his stablemate into third place having led the whole way. Queally only rode 11 winners that season and decided to move to England in search of opportunities. Apprenticed to trainer Barney Curley in Newmarket, he took the apprentice title in his first full season in the Britain in 2004 with 66 winners.

=== Association with Henry Cecil ===
After riding 44, 59 and 88 winners in 2005, 2006 and 2007 respectively, Queally recorded his maiden century in 2008, a year that also saw him riding as number one jockey for Newmarket-based trainer Sir Henry Cecil, although the role was never put on a formal footing.

Queally's first Group 1 win came on Art Connoisseur for Michael Bell in the Group 1 Golden Jubilee Stakes at Royal Ascot on 20 June 2009, a ride which he only obtained due to the suspension of the horse's regular jockey Jamie Spencer. That year he won a further four Group 1 races, three of them for Cecil on Twice Over and Midday, who also finished a close second in the Epsom Oaks.

Queally's association with Midday and Twice Over continued in 2010, with the horses providing Queally with five Group 1 victories, though Midday finished 2nd when bidding for a second win in the Filly and Mare Turf on her return to the Breeders' Cup. By then, the two-year-old Frankel had burst on to the scene, winning his first three starts (including the Group 2 Royal Lodge Stakes at Ascot) before running away with the Group 1 Dewhurst Stakes at Newmarket, part of a Group 1 double on the card for Queally and Cecil – the first for the trainer in his 40-year career – with Twice Over winning the Champion Stakes. Immediately after the race, Frankel was shortened to odds-on favourite for the 2,000 Guineas at Newmarket the following May, with Queally labelling him "A superstar…very special".

On 4 April 2011, Frankel was sent off as odds-on favourite in the 2,000 Guineas at Newmarket. He made all to win by six lengths, the widest margin of victory since Tudor Minstrel in 1947. Speaking after the race, Queally said "The one thing this horse does is gallop – I didn't want to disappoint him, I wanted him to do what he enjoys and he showed them". It was Queally's first (and, as of 2023, only) Classic win. The previous year he had missed out on victory in the 1,000 Guineas when his filly 66-1 chance Jacqueline Quest, trained by Cecil, was first past the post by a nose but was relegated to second place after a stewards' inquiry found that she had drifted and interfered with favourite Special Duty.

Plaudits for Queally's tactics at Newmarket turned to criticism after Frankel's next start at Ascot, in the St James's Palace Stakes. Despite initially settling behind a strong pace set by his stablemate Rerouted, Queally sent Frankel to the lead well before the home turn and only just hung on to win. Both trainer and jockey professed their surprise publicly at the criticism, with Queally dismissing claims the horse was tiring due to the unusual race tactics:"He was starting to get a little fed up as he just does it so easily. He's growing up all the time." After the controversial tactics that led to the narrow victory at Ascot, Frankel was ridden to a five-length victory from the front in the Sussex Stakes at Goodwood. After the race Queally said, referring to the criticism after his ride at Ascot, "It's the price you pay for riding a horse like this but I'll take that on happily". Further Group 1 victories for Queally and Cecil followed (Timepiece in the Falmouth Stakes and the evergreen Midday winning a third Nassau Stakes at Goodwood); while Frankel went on to an easy win in the Group 1 Queen Elizabeth II Stakes (British Champion Mile) at the inaugural QIPCO British Champions Day. Queally finished 2011 with 100 winners and over £2,500,000 in prize-money.

In 2012 Queally rode Frankel in a further five Group 1 victories. At Royal Ascot Frankel won the Queen Anne Stakes in impressive style, beating his nearest rival by 11 lengths. In June, at odds of 1/20, he won the Sussex Stakes for the second time and then, stepped up to ten furlongs, he cemented his reputation as one of the best racehorses of all time in the International Stakes at York. Queally and Frankel completed their partnership by winning the Champion Stakes at British Champions Day at Ascot in October 2012. Queally enjoyed one other Group 1 win during 2012, riding Chachamaidee for Cecil in the Matron Stakes at Leopardstown.

=== Later career ===
After the retirement of Frankel at the end of the 2012 season, and following Cecil's death in the spring of 2013, Queally continued to ride for the stable, led by the trainer's widow Lady Jane Cecil. Wins for the stable included the Ebor Handicap at York. Subsequent years proved difficult for Queally. Wins on The Tin Man in the 2016 British Champions Sprint and 2017 Diamond Jubilee Stakes were, as of 2023, his only Group 1 wins since 2012. In 2019 he achieved only 15 wins, his lowest total since 2003, but his annual wins then increased, reaching 37 at a strike-rate of 14% in 2023.

Having early in his career ridden a few horses over hurdles, Queally had his first start over jumps in November 2020 when he came second in a race at Fontwell Park on a horse trained by Gary Moore.

== Personal life ==
Queally is engaged to Sky Sports presenter Hayley Moore, daughter of trainer Gary Moore. The couple have a daughter, Alice, born in 2022.

== Major wins ==
(United Kingdom) Great Britain

- British Champions Fillies and Mares Stakes – (1) Trick or Treat (2007)
- Diamond Jubilee Stakes – (2) Art Connoisseur (2009), The Tin Man (2017)
- July Cup – (1) Fleeting Spirit (2009)
- Nassau Stakes – (3) – Midday (2009, 2010, 2011)
- Champion Stakes – (3) Twice Over (2009, 2010), Frankel (2012)
- Eclipse Stakes – (1) Twice Over (2010)
- Yorkshire Oaks – (1) Midday (2010)
- Dewhurst Stakes – (1) Frankel (2010)
- 2,000 Guineas – (1) Frankel (2011)
- St. James's Palace Stakes – (1) Frankel (2011)
- Falmouth Stakes – (1) Timepiece (2011)
- Sussex Stakes – (2) Frankel (2011, 2012)
- Queen Elizabeth II Stakes – (1) Frankel (2011)
- Lockinge Stakes – (1) Frankel (2012)
- Queen Anne Stakes – (1) Frankel (2012)
- International Stakes – (1) Frankel (2012)
- British Champions Sprint Stakes – (1) The Tin Man (2016)

France

- Prix Vermeille – (1) Midday (2010)

(Republic of Ireland) Ireland

- Matron Stakes – (1) Chachamaidee (2012)

United States

- Breeders' Cup Filly & Mare Turf – (1) Midday (2009)
