= Ellen Chaloner Stakes =

Flat horse race in Britain

- Class: Listed
- Location: Newmarket Racecourse; Newmarket, England
- Inaugurated: 2000
- Race type: Flat
- Sponsor: Oddschecker
- Website: Newmarket

Race information
- Distance: 6f (1,207 metres)
- Surface: Turf
- Track: Straight
- Qualification: Three-years-old and up fillies and mares (excl Group 1 winners since 31 August 2024)
- Weight: 8 st 12 lb (3yo); 9 st 8 lb (4yo+); Penalties; 7 lb for Group 2 winners * 5 lb for Group 3 winners * 3 lb for Listed winners * * after 31 August 2024
- Purse: £60,000 (2025); 1st: £34,026

Kilvington Fillies' Stakes
2021
Light Refrain	Last Empire	Ventura Diamond

Previous years
2019
Queen Jo Jo	Treasure Me	Iiex Excelsa
2018
Pretty Baby	Classical Times	Carolinae
2017
Artistica	Futoon	Bounce
2016
Ridge Ranger	Marsh Hawk	Alqubbah
2015
Newsletter	Pastoral Girl	Lastuce
2014
Caledonia Lady	Spinatrix	Body And Soul
2013
Scream Blue Murder	Hoyam	Restiadargent
2012
Swiss Dream	Sioux Rising	Ladies Are Forever
2011
Bounty Box	Khor Sheed	Poppy Seed

2010-2001
2010
Prescription	Serious Attitude	Tropical Treat
2009
Lesson In Humility	Carcinetto	Look Busy
2008
Cartimandua	Crystany	Day By Day
2007
Firenze	Perfect Story	Blue Echo
2006
Angus Newz	Indian Maiden	Cape Columbine
2005
Kind	Forever Phoenix	Ringmoor Down
2004
Golden Nun	Forever Phoenix	Look Here's Carol
2003
Irresistible	Look Here's Carol	Millybaa
2002
Bright Edge	Peyto Princess	Agrippina
2000
Hot Tin Roof	Halland Park Girl	Magic Of Love

The Ellen Chaloner Stakes is a Listed flat horse race in Great Britain open to fillies and mares aged three years or older. It is run at Newmarket over a distance of 6 furlongs (1,207 metres), and it is scheduled to take place each year in May.

The race was first run in 2000 at Nottingham and originally titled the Kilvington Fillies' Stakes. It was moved to Newmarket in 2022 and given its present title in 2023 in honour of Ellen Chaloner (d.1944). In 1886 Chaloner became the first woman to be licensed to train racehorses in Great Britain.

== Records ==
Most successful horse:

- No horse has won this race more than once

Leading jockey (2 wins):

- Shane Kelly - Angus Newz (2006), Light Refrain (2021)

Leading trainer (3 wins):

- William Haggas - Pretty Baby (2018), Light Refrain (2021), Unequal Love (2024)

== Winners ==
Year	Winner	Age	Jockey	Trainer	Time
2000	Hot Tin Roof	4	Kevin Darley	Tim Easterby	1:12.50
2001	Abandoned due to waterlogging
2002	Bright Edge	3	Ian Mongan	Bryn Palling	1:17.00
2003	Irresistible	3	J Mackay	Michael Bell	1:15.16
2004	Golden Nun	4	Robert Winston	Tim Easterby	1:15.70
2005	Kind	4	Richard Hughes	Roger Charlton	1:11.17
2006	Angus Newz	3	Shane Kelly	Mick Quinn	1:17.18
2007	Firenze	6	Oscar Urbina	James Fanshawe	1:16.90
2008	Cartimandua	4	Graham Gibbons	Ed McMahon	1:12.90
2009	Lesson In Humility	4	A Elliott	Karl Burke	1:13.35
2010	Prescription	5	Seb Sanders	Sir Mark Prescott	1:12.34
2011	Bounty Box	5	George Baker	Chris Wall	1:12.14
2012	Swiss Dream	4	Liam Keniry	David Elsworth	1:17.76
2013	Scream Blue Murder	5	Wayne Lordan	Tommy Stack	1:14.50
2014	Caledonia Lady	5	Liam Jones	Jo Hughes	1:15.25
2015	Newsletter	3	Shane Foley	Ken Condon	1:14.92
2016	Ridge Ranger	5	Jason Hart	Eric Alston	1:10.42
2017	Artistica	3	Sam Hitchcott	Dominik Moser	1:13.13
2018	Pretty Baby	3	Paul Hanagan	William Haggas	1:11.54
2019	Queen Jo Jo	3	Sam James	Kevin Ryan	1:13.63
	no race 2020 (Note: The 2020 running was cancelled because of the COVID-19 pandemic in the United Kingdom)
2021	Light Refrain	3	Shane Kelly	William Haggas	1:17.08
2022	Umm Kulthum	4	Christophe Soumillon	Richard Fahey	1:11.61
2023	Azure Blue	4	Paul Mulrennan	Michael Dods	1:13.72
2024	Unequal Love	4	Tom Marquand	William Haggas	1:12.18
2025	Tiger Bay	5	Trevor Whelan	Henry Candy	1:10.35
2026	Flora Of Bermuda	5	James Doyle	Andrew Balding	1:10.90

== See also ==
- Horse racing in Great Britain
- List of British flat horse races
