= Quadrilateral (horse) =

British Thoroughbred racehorse

- Racing silks of Khalid Abdullah
- Sire: Frankel
- Grandsire: Galileo
- Dam: Mandela
- Damsire: Mizzen Mast
- Sex: Filly
- Foaled: 11 April 2017
- Country: United Kingdom
- Colour: Chestnut
- Breeder: Juddmonte Farm
- Owner: Khalid Abdullah
- Trainer: Roger Charlton
- Record: 6: 3-0-2
- Earnings: £393,422

Major wins
- Fillies' Mile (2019)

Awards
- Cartier Champion Two-year-old Filly (2019)

Quadrilateral (foaled 11 April 2017) is a British Thoroughbred racehorse. She was one of the best two-year-old fillies in Europe in 2019 when she was unbeaten in three races including the Group 1 Fillies' Mile. She failed to win any of her three races in the following year.

== Background ==
Quadrilateral is a chestnut filly bred in England by her owner Khalid Abdullah's Juddmonte Farm. She was sent into training with Roger Charlton at Beckhampton in Wiltshire.

She was from the fourth crop of foals sired by Frankel, an undefeated racehorse whose other progeny have included Cracksman, Anapurna, Soul Stirring and Without Parole. Quadrilateral's dam Nimble Thimble showed modest ability on the track, winning one minor race from three starts. Her dam Skiable was a half-sister to the outstanding broodmare Hasili.

== Racing career ==
=== 2019: two-year-old season ===
Quadrilateral was ridden in all of her races as a two-year-old by Jason Watson. The filly began her racecourse career in a maiden race over seven furlongs at Newbury Racecourse on 16 August when she started the 7/2 second favourite in a ten-runner field. After racing in mid-division she made steady progress in the last quarter mile, took the lead in the closing stages and won by a neck from the colt Mambo Nights. Five weeks later, over the same course and distance, Quadrilateral contested a minor fillies' race in which she started the 7/4 second favourite behind the Michael Stoute-trained Melnikova. She was restrained by Watson at the rear of the seven-runner field before moving up to take the lead approaching the final furlong and drawing away from her opponents to win in "impressive" style by eight lengths.

On 11 October at Newmarket Racecourse Quadrilateral was stepped up is class and started the 9/4 favourite for the Group 1 Fillies' Mile. Her eight opponents included Love (Moyglare Stud Stakes), Cayenne Pepper (Flame Of Tara Stakes), Powerful Breeze (May Hill Stakes), Boomer (Prestige Stakes) and West End Girl (Sweet Solera Stakes). She settled behind the leaders as West End Girl set the pace, before making progress in the last quarter mile. Quadrilateral maintained her run, overtook Powerful Breeze in the final strides and won by a head with a length and a half back to Love in third place. After the race Charlton said "She kept responding and I thought she did really well to get there. She fought like a good’un and handled the track, it was a great effort really... that was a proper test and she did it 100%."

=== 2020: three-year-old season ===
The flat racing season in England was disrupted by the COVID-19 pandemic and the 1000 Guineas was run a month later than usual on 7 June over the Rowley mile at Newmarket. Quadrilateral headed the betting at odds of 11/4 in a fifteen-runner. With Watson in the saddle she was in contention from the start and kept on well in the closing stages but never looked likely to win and came home third, beaten two and a half quarter lengths and a head by Love and Cloak of Spirits. Thirteen days later, the filly started favourite for Coronation Stakes at Royal Ascot and finished third behind Alpine Star and Sharing, beaten six lengths by the winner. On 23 August the filly was dropped in class and started favourite for the Group 3 Atalanta Stakes over one mile at Sandown Park. She raced in second place for most of the way but was unable to make any progress in the closing stages and came home fourth behind the front-running winner Maamora.

== Pedigree ==
Pedigree of Quadrilateral (GB), chestnut filly, 2017
Sire Frankel (GB) 2008	Galileo (IRE); 1998	Sadler's Wells (USA)	Northern Dancer (CAN)
Sire Frankel (GB) 2008	Galileo (IRE); 1998	Sadler's Wells (USA)	Fairy Bridge
Sire Frankel (GB) 2008	Galileo (IRE); 1998	Urban Sea (USA)	Miswaki
Sire Frankel (GB) 2008	Galileo (IRE); 1998	Urban Sea (USA)	Allegretta (GB)
Sire Frankel (GB) 2008	Kind (IRE); 2001	Danehill (USA)	Danzig
Sire Frankel (GB) 2008	Kind (IRE); 2001	Danehill (USA)	Razyana
Sire Frankel (GB) 2008	Kind (IRE); 2001	Rainbow Lake (GB)	Rainbow Quest (USA)
Sire Frankel (GB) 2008	Kind (IRE); 2001	Rainbow Lake (GB)	Rockfest (USA)
Dam Nimble Thimble (USA) 2009	Mizzen Mast (USA); 1998	Cozzene	Caro (IRE)
Dam Nimble Thimble (USA) 2009	Mizzen Mast (USA); 1998	Cozzene	Ride The Trails
Dam Nimble Thimble (USA) 2009	Mizzen Mast (USA); 1998	Kinema	Graustark
Dam Nimble Thimble (USA) 2009	Mizzen Mast (USA); 1998	Kinema	Mrs Peterkin
Dam Nimble Thimble (USA) 2009	Skiable (IRE); 1990	Niniski (USA)	Nijinsky (CAN)
Dam Nimble Thimble (USA) 2009	Skiable (IRE); 1990	Niniski (USA)	Virginia Hills
Dam Nimble Thimble (USA) 2009	Skiable (IRE); 1990	Kerali (GB)	High Line
Dam Nimble Thimble (USA) 2009	Skiable (IRE); 1990	Kerali (GB)	Sookera (USA) (Family: 11)
