= Powerscourt (horse) =

British-bred Thoroughbred racehorse

- Sire: Sadler's Wells
- Grandsire: Northern Dancer
- Dam: Rainbow Lake
- Damsire: Rainbow Quest
- Sex: Stallion
- Foaled: 1 April 2000
- Country: United Kingdom
- Colour: Bay
- Breeder: Juddmonte Farms
- Owner: Türkiye Jokey kulübü
- Trainer: Aidan O'Brien
- Record: £842,831
- Earnings: 21: 5-6-3

Major wins
- Great Voltigeur Stakes (2003); Tattersalls Gold Cup (2004); Arlington Million (2005)

Powerscourt (1 April 2000 – 17 July 2021) was a British-bred Irish-trained Thoroughbred racehorse and sire, best known for his two runs in the Arlington Million: he was disqualified after finishing first in 2004 but returned to win the race in the following year.

He raced in Ireland, Britain, Germany, the United States, Japan, Hong Kong and the United Arab Emirates in four seasons of racing, winning five of his twenty-one starts. His other major wins came in the Great Voltigeur Stakes at three and the Tattersalls Gold Cup at four. In addition to his wins he was placed in several major races including the Racing Post Trophy, Irish St. Leger, Prince of Wales's Stakes, Bayerisches Zuchtrennen, Irish Champion Stakes and Breeders' Cup Turf.

After his retirement from racing he stood as a breeding stallion in the United States and Turkey.

== Background ==
Powerscourt was a bay horse with a white blaze and three white socks bred in England by Khalid Abdullah's Juddmonte Farms. Before the start of his racing career the colt passed into the ownership of John Magnier's Coolmore Stud organisation and was sent into training with Aidan O'Brien at Ballydoyle. He raced in the ownership of Magnier's wife Susan.

He was from the fifteenth crop of foals sired by Sadler's Wells, who won the Irish 2,000 Guineas, Eclipse Stakes and Irish Champion Stakes in 1984 and went on to be the Champion sire on fourteen occasions. Powerscourt's dam Rainbow Lake was a high-class racehorse who won three of her six races including the Lancashire Oaks. As a broodmare she produced Riposte (Sheepshead Bay Stakes) and Last Train (Prix de Barbeville) but had her biggest success with Kind the dam of Frankel and Noble Mission.

== Racing career ==
=== 2002: two-year-old season ===
On his racecourse debut Powerscourt started 5/4 favourite for a maiden race over seven furlongs at Naas Racecourse on 5 August, but despite finishing strongly he failed by a short head to overhaul his stablemate Macedonian King. He was then sent to England for a six furlong maiden at Newmarket Racecourse in October and finished second of the six runners behind the Henry Cecil-trained Lateen Sails. Later that month at Punchestown he won at the third attempt beating Latino Magic by a length despite swerving to the left in the closing stages. Nine days after his win at Punchestown, the colt was sent to England and moved up sharply in class for the Group 1 Racing Post Trophy at Doncaster. After racing in second place he took the lead in the straight but was overtaken inside the final furlong and finished second to his stablemate Brian Boru.

=== 2003: three-year-old season ===
Powerscourt had training problems and did not reappear until 29 June, when he started at odds of 12/1 for the Irish Derby and came home sixth of the nine runners, more than ten lengths behind the winner Alamshar. In July he was dropped in class and distance for a minor race over ten furlongs at Leopardstown and led from the start to win from the Jim Bolger-trained Napper Tandy. At York on 15 August contested the Great Voltigeur Stakes, a race which usually serves as a trial race for the St Leger and started at odds of 5/1 behind the Michael Stoute-trained Hawk Flyer. The other fancied runners included Brian Boru, High Accolade (King Edward VII Stakes), Dutch Gold (Chester Vase) and Delsarte (Newmarket Stakes). Ridden as in his two previous wins by Mick Kinane, he tracked the leaders before taking the lead in the straight and then rallied after being headed by Brian Boru to regain the advantage in the final strides and prevail by a neck.

Powerscourt bypassed the St Leger on the 13 September (which was won by Brian Boru) and was aimed instead at the Irish equivalent which was run on the same day at the Curragh Racecourse. Racing against older horses for the first time he stayed on well in the straight to finish third behind Vinnie Roe and Gamut, with Bollin Eric back in fourth.

=== 2004: four-year-old season ===
Jamie Spencer took over from Kinane as Powerscourt's regular jockey for the 2004 season. The colt began his campaign in the Tattersalls Gold Cup over ten and a half furlongs at the Curragh on 23 May and started second favourite behind Nysaean (twice winner of the Mooresbridge Stakes). The field was not a strong one by Group 1 standards with only four other runners headed by the Winter Hill Stakes winner Naheef. Powerscourt went to the front from the start, accelerated away from his rivals in the straight and won "easily" by six lengths from the outsider Livadiya.

Powerscourt continued to race in European Group 1 class in his next three races. He finished second to Nayef in the Prince of Wales's Stakes, fifth to Refuse To Bend in the Eclipse Stakes and second to Intendant in the Bayerisches Zuchtrennen. In August the colt was sent to the United States for the twenty-second running of the Arlington Million, a race which saw him equipped with a visor for the first time. O'Brien also took advantage of the more relaxed local rules on raceday medication to run the horse on Lasix, a drug commonly used to prevent bleeding. Starting at odds of 4.6/1 he was restrained towards the rear of the field before making progress on the outside and turning into the straight in fourth. He took the lead a furlong out but hung sharply left, hampering the German challenger Epalo who in turn collided with Kicken Kris, drawing an angry response from the latter's rider Kent Desormeaux. Spencer managed to straighten up Powerscourt in the final strides and he crossed the line first ahead of Kicken Kris, Magistretti and Epalo, only to be disqualified by the racecourse stewards. Under American rules he had to be placed below the horse he had initially obstructed and was therefore relegated to fourth. The Irish Times stated that Powerscourt had appeared to have won the race on merit and he might well have kept the race under European rules. Desormeaux, however, insisted that Kicken Kris would have won "really, really easily" without the interference.

Powerscourt had four more races in the autumn of 2004 and ran well in three of them. He finished a close third to Azamour in the Irish Champion Stakes (with Grey Swallow, Rakti and Doyen behind), and then went back to the United States and finished third behind Better Talk Now and Kitten's Joy in the Breeders' Cup Turf. For his last two races of the year he competed in Asia, finishing unplaced in the Japan Cup and fourth in the Hong Kong Cup.

=== 2005: five-year-old season ===
On 26 March 2005, Powerscourt began his fourth season in Dubai, where he finished fifth to Phoenix Reach in the Sheema Classic. On his return to Europe he ran poorly when a remote fourth in the Hardwicke Stakes (run that year at York) but produced a rather better effort when second to Imperial Stride in the Scottish Classic at Ayr Racecourse in July.

On 13 August Powerscourt, with Kieren Fallon in the saddle, ran for the second time in the Arlington Million and started second choice in the betting behind Kitten's Joy. Better Talk Now was also in the field, while the other seven runners included Sweet Return (Hollywood Derby, Eddie Read Handicap), Good Reward (Manhattan Handicap) and France's Touch of Land (Prix Dollar). As in the previous year he turned into the straight in fourth before launching a strong late run. On this occasion however he maintained a straight course, took the lead inside the final furlong, and drew away to win by three lengths from Kitten's Joy. Coolmore's American stud manager Charles O'Connor commented "This makes up for last year. We knew he was a serious horse all along, and it's great for him to come back and prove it. He did just what he did last year. This is vindication to us". Kieren Fallon said "I thought this was one of the best Arlington Million fields I've seen over the years. I respect Kitten's Joy. I've seen all his wins and I know he's a very good horse. I was expecting him to come home and catch me today, but my lad was at his peak today" and added "this little horse deserved this win, he was unlucky last year to be taken down. I think it was a great training performance by Mr. O'Brien. The horse was in great condition today and he was an impressive winner... He did everything so easy for me today".

== Breeding record ==
At the end of his racing career Powerscourt became a breeding stallion at Coolmore's Ashford Stud in Kentucky. He briefly returned to Ireland before being bought by the Turkish Jockey Club and moving to Turkey in 2010. Died on 17 July 2021 from a heart attack in Turkey

His offspring have included Finnegans Wake (Turf Classic Stakes), Termagant, Court of the Realm (King Edward Stakes) and Kraftig.

== Pedigree ==
Pedigree of Powerscourt (GB), bay stallion, 2000
Sire Sadler's Wells (USA) 1981	Northern Dancer (CAN); 1961	Nearctic	Nearco
Sire Sadler's Wells (USA) 1981	Northern Dancer (CAN); 1961	Nearctic	Lady Angela
Sire Sadler's Wells (USA) 1981	Northern Dancer (CAN); 1961	Natalma	Native Dancer
Sire Sadler's Wells (USA) 1981	Northern Dancer (CAN); 1961	Natalma	Almahmoud
Sire Sadler's Wells (USA) 1981	Fairy Bridge (USA); 1975	Bold Reason	Hail To Reason
Sire Sadler's Wells (USA) 1981	Fairy Bridge (USA); 1975	Bold Reason	Lalun
Sire Sadler's Wells (USA) 1981	Fairy Bridge (USA); 1975	Special	Forli
Sire Sadler's Wells (USA) 1981	Fairy Bridge (USA); 1975	Special	Thong
Dam Rainbow Lake (GB) 1990	Rainbow Quest (USA); 1981	Blushing Groom	Red God
Dam Rainbow Lake (GB) 1990	Rainbow Quest (USA); 1981	Blushing Groom	Runaway Bride
Dam Rainbow Lake (GB) 1990	Rainbow Quest (USA); 1981	I Will Follow	Herbager
Dam Rainbow Lake (GB) 1990	Rainbow Quest (USA); 1981	I Will Follow	Where You Lead
Dam Rainbow Lake (GB) 1990	Rockfest (USA); 1979	Stage Door Johnny	Prince John
Dam Rainbow Lake (GB) 1990	Rockfest (USA); 1979	Stage Door Johnny	Peroxide Blonde
Dam Rainbow Lake (GB) 1990	Rockfest (USA); 1979	Rock Garden	Roan Rocket
Dam Rainbow Lake (GB) 1990	Rockfest (USA); 1979	Rock Garden	Nasira (Family: 1-k)
