= Frankel (horse) =

British Thoroughbred racehorse

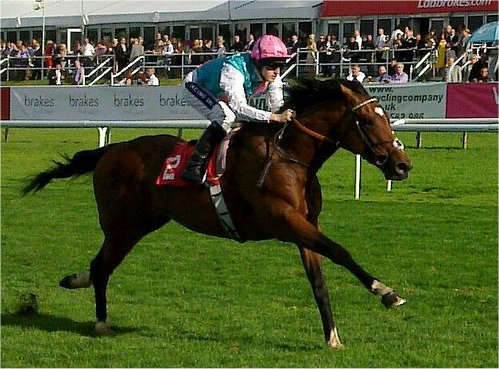
- Frankel in his second start at Doncaster
- Sire: Galileo
- Grandsire: Sadler's Wells
- Dam: Kind
- Damsire: Danehill
- Sex: Stallion
- Foaled: 11 February 2008
- Country: Great Britain
- Colour: Bay
- Breeder: Juddmonte Farms
- Owner: Khalid Abdullah
- Racing colours
- Trainer: Sir Henry Cecil
- Jockey: Tom Queally
- Record: 14: 14–0–0
- Earnings: £2,998,302

Major wins
- Royal Lodge Stakes (2010); Dewhurst Stakes (2010); Greenham Stakes (2011); 2000 Guineas Stakes (2011); St James's Palace Stakes (2011); Sussex Stakes (2011, 2012); Queen Elizabeth II Stakes (2011); Lockinge Stakes (2012); Queen Anne Stakes (2012); International Stakes (2012); Champion Stakes (2012)

Awards
- World Thoroughbred Rankings Leader (2011, 2012); European Horse of the Year (2011, 2012); European Champion Two-Year-Old Colt (2010); European Champion Three-Year-Old Colt (2011); European Champion Older Horse (2012); British Champions Series Hall of Fame (2021); World Sire of the Year (2021); Leading sire in Great Britain and Ireland (2021, 2023); Timeform rating: 147

Frankel (foaled 11 February 2008) is a retired champion British Thoroughbred racehorse and current sire. He was unbeaten in his fourteen-race career and was the highest-rated racehorse in the world from May 2011. He was trained by Sir Henry Cecil in Newmarket and ridden in all his races by Tom Queally.

In 2010 Frankel defeated a field including subsequent Group 1 winners Nathaniel and Colour Vision on his debut before winning the Royal Lodge Stakes by ten lengths and the Dewhurst Stakes in which he defeated the Middle Park Stakes winner Dream Ahead. As a three-year-old, he won the Classic 2000 Guineas by six lengths, the St James's Palace Stakes at Royal Ascot, defeated the outstanding older miler Canford Cliffs in the much-anticipated Sussex Stakes at Goodwood and won the Queen Elizabeth II Stakes at Ascot. Frankel extended his unbeaten record in 2012 by winning the Lockinge Stakes, the Queen Anne Stakes and then the Sussex Stakes for a second time. In August he was moved up to a mile and a quarter for the first time and won the International Stakes at York. In October he won the Champion Stakes at Ascot, again over a mile and a quarter, following which his retirement from racing was announced.

After his win in the Queen Elizabeth II Stakes at Ascot in October 2011, Frankel was given a rating of 143 by Timeform, the highest mark awarded by the organisation in over forty years and their fourth highest of all time behind Sea Bird, Brigadier Gerard and Tudor Minstrel. In June 2012, following his win in the Queen Anne Stakes at Royal Ascot, Timeform raised its provisional rating to 147, making him the highest-rated horse in the organisation's history. In January 2013 Timeform announced that his final rating at the end of his racing career was also 147.

In January 2013, the World Thoroughbred Racehorse Rankings Committee ranked Frankel as the best racehorse they had assessed since their ratings were introduced in 1977, by a margin of two points. The ratings had been recalibrated, since it was believed that in the early years of the scheme horses had been treated more generously than in recent years. Frankel's rating was confirmed at 140, but Dancing Brave was reduced from 141 to 138, Alleged from 140 to 134 and Shergar from 140 to 136. Since 1900, of British-bred racehorses only Ribot has won more races and finished his career unbeaten (racing largely in Italy). Frankel's performance in the 2000 Guineas has been described as "one of the greatest displays on a British racecourse".

Since retiring to stud, Frankel sired notable offspring including Classic winners Adayar (Derby), Hurricane Lane (Irish Derby, St Leger), Logician (St Leger), Anapurna (Oaks), Hungry Heart (Australian Oaks) and Soul Stirring (Japanese Oaks), as well as Alpinista (Prix de l'Arc de Triomphe). He was the leading sire in Great Britain and Ireland in 2021.

== Background ==
Frankel is a bay horse with a large white star, a white snip just above his nose, and four white feet. He was bred by Juddmonte Farms and trained by Cecil, and was owned by the late Khalid Abdullah. He is named after the renowned and late American trainer Bobby Frankel.

Frankel is by champion sire Galileo, out of Listed sprint-winner Kind who is a daughter of champion sire Danehill. Although Galileo won the Derby, doubts surfaced over whether Frankel's staying power would be sufficient for the mile-and-a-half Classic. Frankel was instead targeted towards a three-year-old campaign over a mile, his first main target being the 2000 Guineas.

Frankel's dam, Kind, was a half-sister to Group 1 Arlington Million winner Powerscourt, Group 2 Ribblesdale Stakes winner Riposte and Group 3 Prix de Barbeville winner Last Train. Retired to paddocks in 2006, she foaled three horses to have won Group races: Frankel's three-parts brother Bullet Train – often his work companion and pacemaker – won the Group 3 Lingfield Derby Trial, while Frankel's full-brother Noble Mission, after winning the Listed Newmarket Stakes and finishing second in the Group 2 King Edward VII Stakes at Royal Ascot, went on to win the Group 3 Gordon Stakes at Glorious Goodwood; he ultimately went on to win three Group 1s for Cecil's widow, Lady Jane Cecil, the last being the Champion Stakes at Ascot, emulating Frankel's last win in the same contest. Kind was also dam of Listed winner and Group performer Joyeuse.

As a descendant of the broodmare Circassia, Frankel is from the same branch of Thoroughbred family 1-k which also produced the 2000 Guineas winner Don't Forget Me.

Frankel is bred on the Galileo-Danehill cross, a notable nick that is also apparent in the pedigrees of Group 1 winners Teofilo, Golden Lilac, Roderic O'Connor, Maybe, Intello and Cima De Triomphe.

== Racing career ==
=== 2010: two-year-old season ===
Frankel began his two-year-old career on 13 August in a one-mile maiden race at Newmarket on soft ground. He broke slowly, and was held up by jockey Queally before making headway two furlongs out. He led inside the final furlong and ran on to win "readily" by half a length from John Gosden's future King George VI and Queen Elizabeth Stakes winner Nathaniel.

Four weeks later, Frankel ran in the Frank Whittle Conditions Stakes over seven furlongs at Doncaster. Only two horses opposed him (second favourite Farhh was withdrawn before the start) and he started at odds of 1/2. Queally tracked the leader Diamond Geezah before moving Frankel to the front a furlong from the finish. The horse accelerated past his opponents and drew away to win by thirteen lengths from subsequent Prix Marcel Boussac third Rainbow Springs in impressive style.

==== Juddmonte Royal Lodge Stakes ====
On 25 September, Frankel tackled Group company for the first time in the Juddmonte Royal Lodge Stakes at Ascot, a race sponsored by his owner Khalid Abdullah. The race was notable for Frankel's mid-race move around the home turn, and the colt beat subsequent Horris Hill Stakes winner Klammer by 10 lengths. Treasure Beach, Derby runner-up and Irish Derby winner the following year, was beaten just under 11 lengths. After the race, Peter Scargill of Racing Post said that "the jockey merely pushed his mount out hands and heels to win by ten lengths – it could've easily been more". His trainer said: "He was very impressive. He has been ticking all the right boxes. In the last two months he has started to really improve, improve and improve".

==== Dewhurst Stakes ====
Frankel's final start of the year was the Dewhurst Stakes at Newmarket on 16 October, his first race at Group 1 level. The race – billed as the two-year-old race of the century – also featured two other unbeaten colts; Dream Ahead, 9-length winner of the Group 1 Middle Park Stakes a fortnight earlier and Saamidd, winner of Doncaster's Champagne Stakes and labelled "Pegasus" by his Godolphin stable. Frankel was restrained by Queally before moving up to take the lead a furlong from the finish. He won the race "comfortably" by two and a quarter lengths, despite hanging to the right in the closing stages. The runner-up, Roderic O'Connor, subsequently won the Group 1 Critérium International at Saint-Cloud and then the Irish 2,000 Guineas as a three-year-old. The next day, Cecil said: "Frankel unfortunately got a nasty bump leaving the stalls and that gave him a shock and the result was he ran very free ... things don't always go as one would hope and I don't think the ground helped either."

=== 2011: three-year-old season ===
==== Greenham Stakes ====
Frankel's prep-race for the 2000 Guineas and the first start of his three-year-old career was the Greenham Stakes at Newbury on 16 April over seven furlongs. He defeated Excelebration – who went on to win the Mehl-Mülhens-Rennen (German 2000 Guineas) by seven lengths and the Group 1 Prix du Moulin de Longchamp that season – by four lengths, showing his customary turn of foot around a furlong from home. Following the race, Cecil insisted that the colt would improve dramatically for the outing before the Newmarket Classic.

==== 2000 Guineas Stakes ====
Frankel's racing colours, those of Prince Khalid Abdulla

On 30 April, Frankel was the shortest-priced favourite in the race since 1974 at odds of 1/2. He jumped straight to the lead, surprising many of the jockeys in the race, and had the horse in second place, Racing Post Trophy winner Casamento, off the bridle after only three furlongs. Frankel had a lead of around 15 lengths by halfway and won by six lengths; the biggest winning margin since Tudor Minstrel in 1947.

The performance was described as "barely believable", while Paul Curtis of the Racing Post said afterwards that "Frankel's astonishing performance puts him firmly in the superstar status".

==== St James's Palace Stakes ====
Although he was the long-time favourite for the 2011 Derby, stamina doubts meant that Frankel did not run in what many consider racing's Blue Riband race. Instead, his next start was in the St James's Palace Stakes at Royal Ascot on 14 June. In the race, the pacemaker, Rerouted, set a furious pace and opened up a sizeable lead by half-way. Frankel was then asked by his jockey to go after the leader and passed Rerouted shortly after the three-furlong marker, going on to open up a lead of six lengths on the rest of the field with two furlongs to go. However, in the final furlong, 20-1 shot Zoffany began to make up significant ground and Frankel eventually only won by three-quarters of a length. Following the race, Queally received criticism from a number of quarters for what some considered to be an ill-judged ride, since the mid-race move appeared possibly to have taken too much of a toll on the horse. Despite claims from Cecil and Queally that Frankel was merely idling in front, some observers saw the race as the first time the colt looked less than invulnerable.

==== Sussex Stakes ====
The Sussex Stakes was billed as "The Duel on the Downs" and was viewed by many as the most eagerly awaited confrontation in years. Frankel scored a five-length victory over the world's top-rated older miler and five-time consecutive Group 1 winner Canford Cliffs on 27 July at Goodwood. In a moderately run and tactical affair, Frankel made all the running to beat the horse who had accounted for three-time Breeders' Cup Mile winner Goldikova in his previous race. Canford Cliffs was found to have a shadow on his pastern, which could cause serious damage if exacerbated. Thus, he was retired on veterinary advice directly after the race and would become a breeding stallion.

Frankel received many accolades following his victory. His trainer said: "I think it's a facetious thing to say, but he's the best I've ever seen. I suppose the only ones I could compare would be Shergar and Blushing Groom at his best. I can't go back to the days of Tudor Minstrel and match races, but he's the best in my lifetime." During the interview Cecil also said that he had expected the colt to win easily, despite having ample respect for his horse's rival Canford Cliffs.

After the victory, the British Horseracing Authority raised Frankel's official rating from 130 (tied with Australian horse Black Caviar) to 135, making him officially the best racehorse in the world.

Following Frankel's win, rumours abounded that Cecil would aim him at the Juddmonte International Stakes at York in mid-August. The race, over a mile and a quarter, would be the first time Frankel would contest a race over that distance. However, after consideration with owner Prince Khalid Abdulla, Cecil announced the following day that the colt would have only one more race in 2011, in the Queen Elizabeth II Stakes at Ascot's inaugural QIPCO British Champions Day on 15 October.

==== Queen Elizabeth II Stakes ====
Despite his reputation, Frankel did not scare off the opposition on 15 October as a strong eight-horse field was declared for Queen Elizabeth II Stakes. The runners included Excelebration, the Prix du Moulin de Longchamp winner, the Coronation Stakes and Prix Jacques Le Marois winner Immortal Verse and Dick Turpin. The previous year's winner of the Queen Elizabeth II Stakes, the Godolphin-trained Poet's Voice, also featured.

Frankel won by 4 lengths, with Group 1 winners Excelebration and Immortal Verse filling the minor placings. It was the third time that Excelebration had succumbed to the Cecil-trained star.

He was given a Timeform rating of 143 at the end of his three-year-old career, moving him up to fourth in the Timeform all-time flat rating list.

=== 2012: four-year-old season ===
Whilst hitherto Frankel had contested races over no further than a mile (eight furlongs) as a two and three-year-old, his four-year-old campaign was expected to comprise some of the premier ten-furlong middle-distance races in the calendar. In October 2011 Teddy Grimthorpe, racing manager to Prince Khalid Abdulla, mentioned "the Eclipse and the Juddmonte" as potential targets later in the 2012 season, while it was possible that the horse might contest the Breeders' Cup Mile or Classic at Santa Anita as a final career start.

Cecil said in October 2011 that he believed his charge would improve for another winter and that the horse "will get a mile and a quarter very easily". The Newmarket trainer added: "He's really beginning to grow up. You're going to see a better horse next year and he's pretty good as he is."

==== Injury scare ====
Reports surfaced that Frankel had suffered an injury to his off-fore on Wednesday 11 April while working on Racecourse Side in Newmarket. A statement from Juddmonte, the operation of Frankel's owner Khalid Abdullah, read: "He is such an extravagant mover that he hit himself. At this stage the injury looks superficial but he will be kept monitored over the next few days."

Frankel had a scan which came up clear but, due to filling in the injury, a scan for the following week was arranged to arrive at a more definitive diagnosis once that filling had dissipated.

Before this second scan, rumours sparked by TV reports during coverage of the Grand National at Aintree spread that Frankel had been retired. This claim was rejected by Grimthorpe and, later, the second scan showed no damage.

On 25 April, Frankel worked for the first time after incurring his injury and, on 5 May, Frankel took part in a public exercise gallop at Newmarket. He pulled clear of his work companions Bullet Train and Jet Away in the closing stages of the workout in a style which pleased Cecil.

==== Lockinge Stakes ====
On 19 May, Frankel made his first appearance of the year in the Group 1 Lockinge Stakes at Newbury. Amongst his five rivals was old rival Excelebration, who had since moved to the Ballydoyle stable of Aidan O'Brien from Marco Botti's yard in Newmarket and, as an easy winner of the Gladness Stakes the previous month, had the advantage of race fitness. However, Frankel – always ahead of Excelebration in the race – tracked his pacemaker Bullet Train before moving into the lead two furlongs from the finish, pulling clear to win by five lengths. The Guardian's correspondent described the "aura" surrounding Frankel as "surreal". Cecil was measured in his praise, pointing out that the horse was not at his best and would probably improve as the season progressed.

Cecil subsequently said: "Over the last two seasons Frankel has come on a good deal from his first race and hopefully he will do the same this season. He has strengthened and grown up a great deal mentally. All being well his next start will be at Ascot in either the Queen Anne or the Prince of Wales, the former being my first preference at the moment, but we will see."

==== Queen Anne Stakes ====
On 19 June Frankel started at odds of 1/10 for the Queen Anne Stakes at Royal Ascot against a field which included Excelebration and Strong Suit, respectively ranked the equal second and the equal fifth best three-year-old colts in the world by the IFHA in 2011. Frankel took the lead three furlongs from the finish and drew steadily clear to win by eleven lengths from Excelebration. Frankel ran the penultimate furlong in a time of 10.58 seconds, which equates to a top speed of over 42 mph. The Guardian's correspondent described the performance as possibly the greatest in the history of Thoroughbred racing. Timeform responded to the win by raising Frankel's provisional rating to 147, the highest in the organisation's history, two pounds in advance of the 145 recorded in 1965 by Sea-Bird. However the British Horseracing Authority's handicapper, Dominic Gardiner-Hill, was more cautious. He rated the horse at 140, which was still just behind Dancing Brave's all-time record mark of 141. Racing Post gave the performance a rating of 142, the highest in the publication's history, three pounds ahead of Dubai Millennium.

The day after the race, Cecil said that Frankel had lost a shoe towards the end of the contest. "His foot is in a poultice as a precaution but there's no problem and he was out having a pick of grass this morning", he said. Cecil seemed to indicate that the Sussex Stakes at Goodwood followed by the Juddmonte Stakes at York would be Frankel's next two races.

==== Sussex Stakes ====
On 1 August Frankel repeated his previous year's victory in the Sussex Stakes at Goodwood. Starting at odds of 1/20 against only three rivals, he won by six lengths from Farhh. With this victory, Frankel equalled the record for consecutive European Group 1 victories (seven in a row) set by Rock of Gibraltar, and also became the first horse to win the Sussex Stakes twice.

After the race, Queally said: "Every moment spent on Frankel's back is a special moment. He is amazing and had all the others cooked at halfway. It was a nice prep for his next race. He is a class apart from any other horse around and does it all very easily ... Turning into the straight, I slipped him an inch of rein. You don't have to do much on him. He's so competitive and he has a will to win like no other horse I've ridden."

Lord Grimthorpe, the racing manager to the horse's owner, Khalid Abdullah, said: "There are two obvious races for him, the Juddmonte and the Champion Stakes [Ascot, October 20], but there is a gap of nearly two months between them, and Henry may decide to give him a race in between, possibly something like the Prix du Moulin [Longchamp, September 16]."

==== Juddmonte International Stakes ====
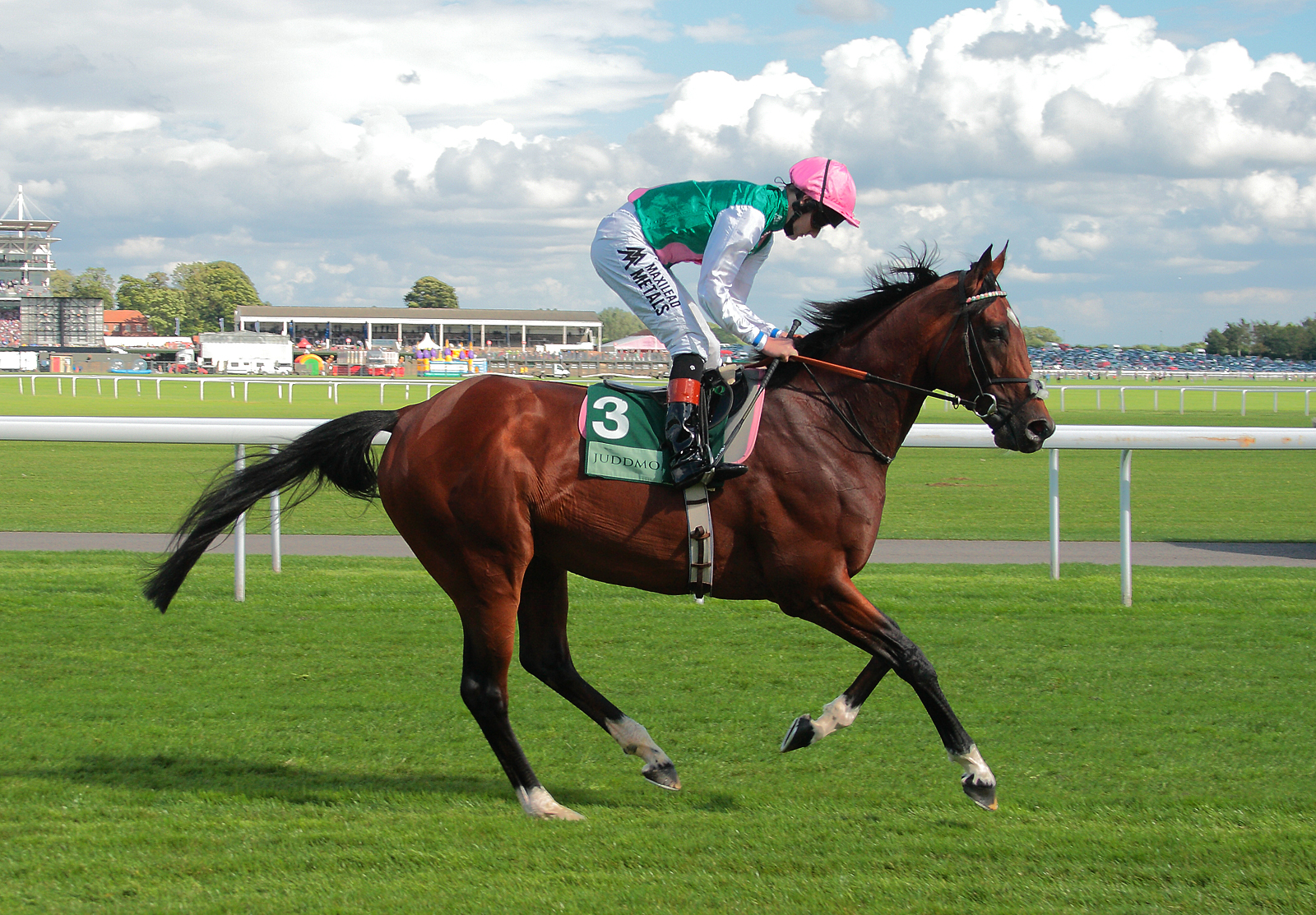
Frankel goes to the post for the Juddmonte International at York, 2012

On 22 August, Frankel won the Juddmonte International Stakes at York. This race was over 10 furlongs and was the first time that he raced over more than a mile. Consequently, there was much anticipation as to whether he would stay the extra distance. Starting at odds of 1/10 against eight rivals, he barely came off the bridle to win easily by seven lengths from Farhh, who was a nose ahead of four-time Group 1 winner St Nicholas Abbey in third. Most striking, was the dominance Frankel's very high cruising speed gave him, particularly now upped in distance to 10 furlongs. Indeed, TV footage of the aftermath in the Winners' Enclosure, shows Cecil in genuine awe of his equine protégé, running his hands down the horse's back to demonstrate there was hardly a bead of sweat to be found. This was his eighth consecutive European Group 1 victory, breaking the previous record of seven in a row set by Rock of Gibraltar. After the race trainer Cecil said "It's fantastic. It's great for Yorkshire and they deserved to see him." He was attending the racecourse after missing Frankel's previous win due to ill health and said the win made him feel "twenty years better."

Writing a few days after the race, Marcus Armytage said: "Forget ratings, handicappers' assessments or any other method by which you measure one racehorse against another, it is unlikely that the world in either this or any previous generation has ever seen a better racehorse than Frankel ... What makes him unique is his ability to go a top class sprinter's pace over distance ... he is a lightning strike of genetics which may not be repeated for 100 years."

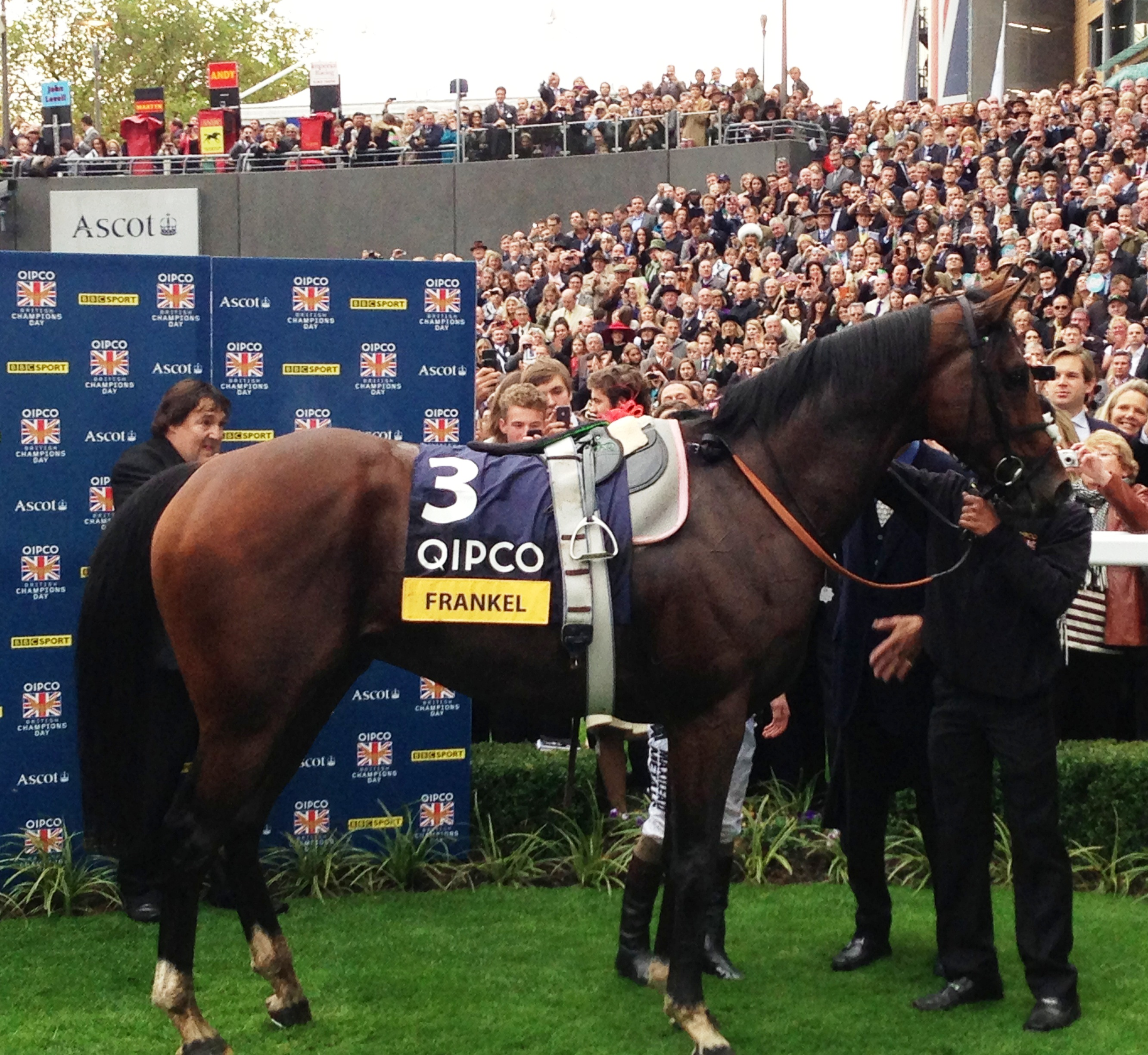
Frankel in the winners' enclosure at Ascot after winning his final race, the Champion Stakes

Frankel was expected to have only one more race in his career, and to stand as a stallion from 2013. Having demonstrated at York his ability comfortably to stay ten furlongs, there was speculation that there might be a change to his programme, with his final race being the twelve furlong (mile and a half) Prix de l'Arc de Triomphe at Longchamp in October. However, on 31 August Lord Grimthorpe said that Frankel's next race would be the Champion Stakes.

==== Champion Stakes ====
On 20 October Frankel won the Champion Stakes at Ascot over ten furlongs. The ground was more testing than he had faced hitherto, being soft, heavy in places, and the colt's participation had been in doubt until Lord Grimthorpe walked the course on the morning of the race and gave the go ahead. In spite of losing several lengths at the start he beat the previous year's victor Cirrus des Aigles by one and three-quarter lengths, with Nathaniel a further two and a half lengths back in third. He had attracted a sell-out crowd of 32,000, who cheered him home from three furlongs out. After the race Prince Khalid Abdullah confirmed that the horse would be retired to stud.

Corine Barande-Barbe, trainer of Cirrus des Aigles, magnanimously said after the race: "It was a great day and it was like a victory to make Frankel gallop." Teddy Grimthorpe commented: "The way everyone has reacted to Frankel and Henry has been one of the great sporting stories of the year if not for many years. It was just brilliant and totally deserved." Queally said: "You never see an F1 car win on anything but tarmac but for him to win on ground like that shows how special he is. There was a bigger crowd at Royal Ascot but this was more intense. I don't know what I would have done if he didn't win." Cecil commented: "He's the best I've ever had, the best I've ever seen. I'd be very surprised if there's ever been anything better."

Amongst the tributes paid to Cecil's training of the horse was an article by Paul Hayward, chief sports writer of the Daily Telegraph, in which he wrote: "Frankel is Cecil's masterwork, the monument he will leave in racing folklore. His patient, shrewd, empathic management of probably Flat racing's all-time finest animal was achieved amid the ravages of chemotherapy and cancer ... From the 2,000 Guineas onwards, Cecil set about modulating Frankel's zest to get him to settle and use his speed more clinically ... It took a while, but by Saturday the world No 1 was so laid-back he fell out of the stalls half-asleep." Hayward quoted Cecil as saying after the race: "I've probably got him too relaxed. It used to be the other way round."

== Race record ==
Date	Distance (Condition)	Race	Class	Course	Field	HN	Odds	Finish	Time	Winning Margin	Jockey	(Runner-up)	Ref
2010 – Two-year-old season
Aug 13	1 mile (Soft)	EBF Maiden Stakes	4	Newmarket	12	6	7/4F	1st	1:43.69	1/2 length	Tom Queally	(Nathaniel)	
Sep 10	7 furlongs (Good)	Frank Whittle Partnership Stakes	2	Doncaster	3	2	1/2F	1st	1:24.83	13 lengths	Tom Queally	(Rainbow Springs)	
Sep 25	1 mile (Good to Soft)	Royal Lodge Stakes	G2	Ascot	5	2	3/10F	1st	1:41.73	10 lengths	Tom Queally	(Klammer)	
Oct 16	7 furlongs (Good to Soft)	Dewhurst Stakes	G1	Newmarket	6	2	4/6F	1st	1:25.73	2 1/4 lengths	Tom Queally	(Roderic O'Connor)	
2011 – Three-year-old season
Apr 16	7 furlongs (Good to Firm)	Greenham Stakes	G3	Newbury	6	2	1/4F	1st	1:24.60	4 lengths	Tom Queally	(Excelebration)	
Apr 30	1 mile (Good to Firm)	2000 Guineas Stakes	G1	Newmarket	13	4	1/2F	1st	1:37.30	6 lengths	Tom Queally	(Dubawi Gold)	
Jun 14	1 mile (Good)	St. James's Palace Stakes	G1	Ascot	9	4	3/10F	1st	1:39.24	3/4 length	Tom Queally	(Zoffany)	
Jul 27	1 mile (Good)	Sussex Stakes	G1	Goodwood	4	4	8/13F	1st	1:37.47	5 lengths	Tom Queally	(Canford Cliffs)	
Oct 15	1 mile (Good)	Queen Elizabeth II Stakes	G1	Ascot	8	7	4/11F	1st	1:39.45	4 lengths	Tom Queally	(Excelebration)	
2012 – Four-year-old season
May 19	1 mile (Good)	Lockinge Stakes	G1	Newbury	6	4	2/7F	1st	1:38.14	5 lengths	Tom Queally	(Excelebration)	
Jun 19	1 mile (Good to Soft)	Queen Anne Stakes	G1	Ascot	11	3	1/10F	1st	1:37.85	11 lengths	Tom Queally	(Excelebration)	
Aug 1	1 mile (Good)	Sussex Stakes	G1	Goodwood	4	3	1/20F	1st	1:37.56	6 lengths	Tom Queally	(Farhh)	
Aug 22	1 mile 2 1/2 furlongs (Good to Firm)	International Stakes	G1	York	9	3	1/10F	1st	2:06.59	7 lengths	Tom Queally	(Farhh)	
Oct 20	1 1/4 miles (Soft)	Champion Stakes	G1	Ascot	6	3	2/11F	1st	2:10.22	1 3/4 lengths	Tom Queally	(Cirrus des Aigles)	

== Post-racing awards ==
In 2021, Frankel became one of two inaugural Hall of Famers to be inducted into the British Champions Series Hall of Fame. In 2023, he was voted the People's Champion by Racing Post readers.

== Stud career ==
Frankel stands at stud at Banstead Manor Stud at Cheveley in Cambridgeshire, where he was born. He covered his first mares on Valentine's Day, February 2013. His 2013 stud fee was £125,000. In 2020, his fee was £175,000. In his first season, he covered 133 mares, including 2011 Prix de l'Arc de Triomphe winner Danedream, three times Nassau Stakes winner Midday, and 2011 Kentucky Broodmare of the year Oatsee. Of those, 126 were scanned as in foal for a fertility rate of 95 percent. On 16 June 2014, Frankel's first foal to be sent to auction was sold for £1.15 million.

Frankel's first runner on a racecourse was a bay colt named Cunco who won on his debut in a Newbury maiden on Friday, 13 May 2016. Cunco was also Frankel's first-born foal, born in Ireland at the Coolmore Stud, and was out of Chrysanthemum, who was the first mare scanned in foal to Frankel. Frankel's first major winners came in the summer of 2016 as Fair Eva won the Princess Margaret Stakes and Queen Kindly took the Lowther Stakes. In December, he had his first winner at the highest level when his daughter Soul Stirring won the Grade 1 Hanshin Juvenile Fillies. In 2017, Soul Stirring won the Yushun Himba. Frankel sired his first winner of a European Group 1 race when Cracksman won the Champion Stakes in October 2017. As a result, his stud fee rose from the initial £125,000 to £175,000.

In 2018, Frankel reached 20 Northern Hemisphere Group winners faster than any other European sire in the history of the Pattern and was second only to his sire Galileo in terms of Group winners foaled from 2014 to 2016 north of the Equator. His 2018 Group winners included Without Parole, winner of the St James's Palace Stakes at Royal Ascot (at which Frankel was the leading sire) and Cracksman, who won a second Champion Stakes to become the first horse since his sire to win at successive British Champions Days. Frankel's percentage of stakes horses to runners was 27%.

Frankel was the leading sire in Great Britain and Ireland in 2021, with progeny earnings of over £5.2 million pounds. His leading performers were Adayar and Hurricane Lane, winners of the English Irish Derbies respectively. In 2022, his daughter Alpinista won the Prix de l'Arc de Triomphe. For the 2022 season, his stallion fee was £200,000, raised to £275,000 for 2023. For the 2024 season, his fee was raised to £350,000.

=== Notable progeny ===
c = colt, f = filly, g = gelding

Foaled	Name	Dam	Sex	Major wins
2014	Call the Wind	In Clover	g	Prix du Cadran
2014	Cracksman	Rhadegunda	c	Champion Stakes x2, Coronation Cup, Prix Ganay
2014	Dream Castle	Sand Vixen	g	Jebel Hatta
2014	Mirage Dancer	Heat Haze	c	The Metropolitan
2014	Mozu Ascot	India	c	Yasuda Kinen, February Stakes
2014	Soul Stirring	Stacelita	f	Hanshin Juvenile Fillies, Yushun Himba
2015	Veracious	Infallible	f	Falmouth Stakes
2015	Without Parole	Without You Babe	c	St James's Palace Stakes
2016	Anapurna	Dash to the Top	f	Oaks, Prix de Royallieu
2016	Logician	Scuffle	c	St Leger Stakes
2017	Alpinista	Alwilda	f	Grosser Preis von Berlin, Preis von Europa, Grosser Preis von Bayern, Grand Prix de Saint-Cloud, Yorkshire Oaks, Prix de l'Arc de Triomphe
2017	Hungry Heart	Harlech	f	Vinery Stud Stakes, Australian Oaks
2017	Quadrilateral	Nimble Thimble	f	Fillies' Mile
2018	Grenadier Guards	Wavell Avenue	c	Asahi Hai Futurity Stakes
2018	Adayar	Anna Salai	c	Derby, King George VI and Queen Elizabeth Stakes
2018	Converge	Conversely	g	The J. J. Atkins, Randwick Guineas
2018	Hurricane Lane	Gale Force	c	Irish Derby, Grand Prix de Paris, St Leger Stakes
2018	Mostahdaf	Handassa	c	Prince of Wales's Stakes, Juddmonte International
2018	Snow Lantern	Sky Lantern	f	Falmouth Stakes
2019	Courage Mon Ami	Crimson Ribbon	g	Ascot Gold Cup
2019	Homeless Songs	Joailliere	f	Irish 1,000 Guineas
2019	Inspiral	Starscope	f	Fillies' Mile, Coronation Stakes, Prix Jacques Le Marois x2, Sun Chariot Stakes, Breeders' Cup Filly & Mare Turf
2019	McKulick	Astrelle	f	Belmont Oaks
2019	Nashwa	Princess Loulou	f	Prix de Diane, Nassau Stakes, Falmouth Stakes
2019	Onesto	Onshore	c	Grand Prix de Paris
2019	Triple Time	Reem Three	c	Queen Anne Stakes
2019	Westover	Mirabilis	c	Irish Derby, Grand Prix de Saint-Cloud
2019	Wild Beauty	Tulips	f	Natalma Stakes
2020	Chaldean	Suelita	c	Dewhurst Stakes, 2000 Guineas Stakes
2020	Jannah Rose	Sophie Germain	f	Prix Saint-Alary
2020	Soul Sister	Dream Peace	f	Oaks
2020	Kelina	Incahoots	f	Prix de la Forêt
2020	Measured Time	Minidress	c	Jebel Hatta, Manhattan Stakes
2021	Ylang Ylang	Shambolic	f	Fillies' Mile
2021	Candelari	Candara	g	Prix Vicomtesse Vigier
2021	El Cordobes	Bold Lass	g	Sword Dancer Stakes
2021	Diego Velazquez	Sweepstake	c	Prix Jacques Le Marois
2021	Sir Delius	Whatami	c	Underwood Stakes, Turnbull Stakes, Queen Elizabeth Stakes
2022	Lake Victoria	Quiet Reflection	f	Moyglare Stud Stakes, Cheveley Park Stakes, Breeders' Cup Juvenile Fillies Turf, Irish 1,000 Guineas
2022	Minnie Hauk	Multilingual	f	Oaks, Irish Oaks, Yorkshire Oaks, British Champions Fillies and Mares Stakes
2023	Thundering On	Thundering Nights	f	Oaks
2023	Benvenuto Cellini	Newspaperofrecord	c	Irish Derby, Breeders' Cup Turf
2023	Item	Capla Temptress	c	International Stakes
2023	Point Of Law	Portfolio	c	Melbourne Cup
2024	Giant Sequoia	Pink Dogwood	c	Futurity Trophy

== Pedigree ==
Pedigree of Frankel, bay stallion, 2008
Sire Galileo (IRE) b. 1998	Sadler's Wells (USA) b. 1981	Northern Dancer (CAN) b. 1961	Nearctic (CAN)
Sire Galileo (IRE) b. 1998	Sadler's Wells (USA) b. 1981	Northern Dancer (CAN) b. 1961	Natalma (USA)
Sire Galileo (IRE) b. 1998	Sadler's Wells (USA) b. 1981	Fairy Bridge (USA) b. 1975	Bold Reason (USA)
Sire Galileo (IRE) b. 1998	Sadler's Wells (USA) b. 1981	Fairy Bridge (USA) b. 1975	Special (USA)
Sire Galileo (IRE) b. 1998	Urban Sea (USA) ch. 1989	Miswaki (USA) ch. 1978	Mr. Prospector (USA)
Sire Galileo (IRE) b. 1998	Urban Sea (USA) ch. 1989	Miswaki (USA) ch. 1978	Hopespringseternal (USA)
Sire Galileo (IRE) b. 1998	Urban Sea (USA) ch. 1989	Allegretta (GB) ch. 1978	Lombard (GER)
Sire Galileo (IRE) b. 1998	Urban Sea (USA) ch. 1989	Allegretta (GB) ch. 1978	Anatevka (GER)
Dam Kind (IRE) b. 2001	Danehill (USA) b. 1986	Danzig (USA) b./br. 1977	Northern Dancer (CAN)
Dam Kind (IRE) b. 2001	Danehill (USA) b. 1986	Danzig (USA) b./br. 1977	Pas De Nom (USA)
Dam Kind (IRE) b. 2001	Danehill (USA) b. 1986	Razyana (USA) b. 1981	His Majesty (USA)
Dam Kind (IRE) b. 2001	Danehill (USA) b. 1986	Razyana (USA) b. 1981	Spring Adieu (CAN)
Dam Kind (IRE) b. 2001	Rainbow Lake (GB) b. 1990	Rainbow Quest (USA) b. 1981	Blushing Groom (FR)
Dam Kind (IRE) b. 2001	Rainbow Lake (GB) b. 1990	Rainbow Quest (USA) b. 1981	I Will Follow (USA)
Dam Kind (IRE) b. 2001	Rainbow Lake (GB) b. 1990	Rockfest (USA) ch. 1979	Stage Door Johnny (USA)
Dam Kind (IRE) b. 2001	Rainbow Lake (GB) b. 1990	Rockfest (USA) ch. 1979	Rock Garden (GB) (Family 1-k)

Note: b. = Bay, br. = Brown, ch. = Chestnut

- Frankel is inbred 3 × 4 to the stallion Northern Dancer, meaning that Northern Dancer appears once in the third generation and once in the fourth generation of his pedigree.

== Bibliography ==
- Andrew Pennington and Racing Post, Frankel: The Wonder Horse, Racing Post Books, 2012, ISBN 978-1-908216-63-2
- Frankel – The Official Story [DVD], 2012

== See also ==
- List of leading Thoroughbred racehorses
- List of racehorses
