= Termagant (horse) =

Irish-bred Thoroughbred racehorse

- Sire: Powerscourt
- Grandsire: Sadler's Wells
- Dam: Rock Salt
- Damsire: Selkirk
- Sex: Mare
- Foaled: 28 January 2007
- Country: Ireland
- Colour: Bay
- Breeder: Old Carhue Stud
- Owner: Joerg Vasicek
- Trainer: Kevin Prendergast
- Record: 6: 2-0-0
- Earnings: £158,985

Major wins
- Moyglare Stud Stakes (2009)

Termagant (foaled 28 January 2007) is an Irish Thoroughbred racehorse and broodmare. As a two-year-old she was one of the best fillies of her generation in Ireland, winning both of her races including the Group 1 Moyglare Stud Stakes. She failed to win again and ran only four more times over the next two years before being retired from racing.

== Background ==
Termagant is a bay mare with a narrow white blaze and two white sock bred in County Cork, Ireland by Denis O'Flynn's Old Carhue Stud. As a yearling the filly was consigned to the Goffs sale and was bought for €34,000 by Frank Barry on behalf of the veteran trainer Kevin Prendergast. She initially raced in the colours of Prendergast's wife before being transferred to the ownership of Joerg Vasicek. She was ridden in all of her races by Declan McDonogh.

She was from the first crop of foals sired by Powerscourt a top class international performer whose wins included the Arlington Million and the Tattersalls Gold Cup. He was not a conspicuous success at stud and was exported to stand in Turkey. Termagant's dam Rock Salt showed little racing ability, failing to win in four starts in France as a three-year-old in 2004. She was a granddaughter of the broodmare Populi (a half-sister to Temperence Hill) who was the dam of Vanlandingham and the grand-dam of African Rose.

== Racing career ==
=== 2009: two-year-old season ===
Termagant made her racecourse debut in a maiden race over seven furlongs at Leopardstown Racecourse on 11 June and started a 14/1 outsider in a five-runner field. After being restrained in the early stages she went to the front a furlong out and broke clear of her opponents to win by two lengths from the Aidan O'Brien-trained Cabaret.

After a break of two and a half months, the filly returned to the track and was moved up sharply in class to contest the Group 1 Moyglare Stud Stakes on heavy ground at the Curragh on 30 August. Lillie Langtry started favourite in the seven-runner field ahead of Long Lashes (winner of the Sweet Solera Stakes) and the Jim Bolger-trained Gile Na Greine with Termagant next in the betting on 16/1 alongside her stablemate Wrong Answer (Marble Hill Stakes). Termagant was settled in mid-division as the 66/1 outsider Famous set the pace from Gold Bubbles and Long Lashes, but made a forward move entering the last quarter mile. She took the lead approaching the final furlong and stayed on well to win by two and a half lengths from Famous, with Lillie Langtry in third. After the race Kevin Prendergast said "It was always the plan to come here after her debut win. She might not run again this season. I hope she'll be just as good on decent ground, but it could be that this is her ground".

=== 2010: three-year-old season ===
On 23 May Termagant made her first and only appearance of 2010 in the Irish 1,000 Guineas at the Curragh. Before the race Prendergast explained that the filly had been held up in her progress by the exceptionally cold winter but had recently been "working nicely". Starting the 8/1 fifth choice in the nineteen-runner field she raced towards the rear before making some progress in the last quarter mile and finished ninth, five lengths behind the winner Bethrah.

=== 2011: four-year-old season ===
After an absence of almost ten months Termagant returned in the Group 3 Park Express Stakes at the Curragh in March. She started joint-favourite but came home fourth of the nine runners behind Lolly For Dolly. On 2 May she was matched against male opposition in the Mooresbridge Stakes over ten furlongs but made little impact, finishing a distant fourth behind So You Think. Nineteen days after the Mooresbridge Stakes Termagant was equipped with blinkers for the first time in the Equestrian Stakes at the same track. She took the lead soon after the start and opened up a clear lead before fading badly and finishing last of the nine runners.

== Breeding record ==
Following her retirement from racing Termagant became a broodmare for her owner's Kenilworth House Stud. As of 2017, she has produced two foals, neither of whom have appeared on the track:

- Coup de Main, a bay filly, foaled in 2013, sired by Oasis Dream. Sold for 350,000 guineas as a yearling.
- My Daydream, bay filly, 2015, by Oasis Dream. Sold for 260,000 guineas as a yearling.

== Pedigree ==
Pedigree of Termagant (IRE), bay mare, 2007
Sire Powerscourt (GB) 2000	Sadler's Wells (USA); 1981	Northern Dancer	Nearctic
Sire Powerscourt (GB) 2000	Sadler's Wells (USA); 1981	Northern Dancer	Natalma
Sire Powerscourt (GB) 2000	Sadler's Wells (USA); 1981	Fairy Bridge	Bold Reason
Sire Powerscourt (GB) 2000	Sadler's Wells (USA); 1981	Fairy Bridge	Special
Sire Powerscourt (GB) 2000	Rainbow Lake (GB); 1990	Rainbow Quest	Blushing Groom
Sire Powerscourt (GB) 2000	Rainbow Lake (GB); 1990	Rainbow Quest	I Will Follow
Sire Powerscourt (GB) 2000	Rainbow Lake (GB); 1990	Rockfest	Stage Door Johnny
Sire Powerscourt (GB) 2000	Rainbow Lake (GB); 1990	Rockfest	Rock Garden
Dam Rock Salt (GB) 2001	Selkirk (USA); 1988	Sharpen Up	Atan
Dam Rock Salt (GB) 2001	Selkirk (USA); 1988	Sharpen Up	Rocchetta
Dam Rock Salt (GB) 2001	Selkirk (USA); 1988	Annie Edge	Nebbiolo
Dam Rock Salt (GB) 2001	Selkirk (USA); 1988	Annie Edge	Friendly Court
Dam Rock Salt (GB) 2001	Kamkova (USA); 1984	Northern Dancer	Nearctic
Dam Rock Salt (GB) 2001	Kamkova (USA); 1984	Northern Dancer	Natalma
Dam Rock Salt (GB) 2001	Kamkova (USA); 1984	Populi	Star Envoy
Dam Rock Salt (GB) 2001	Kamkova (USA); 1984	Populi	Sister Shannon (Family 4-f)

- Termagant was inbred 3 × 3 to Northern Dancer, meaning that this stallion appears twice in the third generation of his pedigree.
