= Barney Curley =

British racehorse trainer and gambler (1939–2021)

- Occupation: Horse trainer, gambler, philanthropist
- Born: 5 October 1939; Irvinestown, County Fermanagh, Northern Ireland
- Died: 23 May 2021 (aged 81)

Bernard Joseph Curley (5 October 1939 – 23 May 2021) was a racehorse trainer, gambler and founder of the Zambian charity DAFA from Northern Ireland

== Biography ==
Bernard Joseph (Barney) Curley was born one of six children to Kathleen and Charlie Curley. He attended Mungret College with the intent of becoming a Jesuit priest, but several years into his training contracted TB and was hospitalised for nine months.

He then owned a bookmaker's shop in Belfast (which went bust) and a pub before going into music management, serving as manager of the act Frankie McBride and the Polka Dots who had a hit on the British singles chart with the song Five Little Fingers.

However he decided on a career in thoroughbred horse racing. As a trainer he had stables in County Westmeath and later in the Newmarket area between 1985 and 2012.

Curley was known as a shrewd operator and was suspected of running "coups" against Irish bookmakers. In particular (and his most successful) the 1975 Yellow Sam betting coup in Britain and Ireland which netted him IR£ 300,000. Following this success he made a point not to pursue further scams against bookmakers.

In 1988 he made an extended television appearance on the Channel 4 discussion programme After Dark, alongside among others John McCririck, Margaret, Duchess of Argyll and General Sir Cecil "Monkey" Blacker.

In 1995, his 18-year-old son, Charlie, died in a car crash. The following year, following a visit encouraged by a friend, he went to Zambia, and, troubled by the illness and poverty he witnessed, Curley founded the charity Direct Aid For Africa (DAFA) to support the underprivileged.

He helped develop the careers of several leading jockeys, including Frankie Dettori and Tom Queally.

== Death ==
Barney Curley died peacefully at his home, a stud farm near Newmarket, on 23 May 2021, aged 81.
