= Yellow Sam betting coup =

1975 horse racing event in Ireland

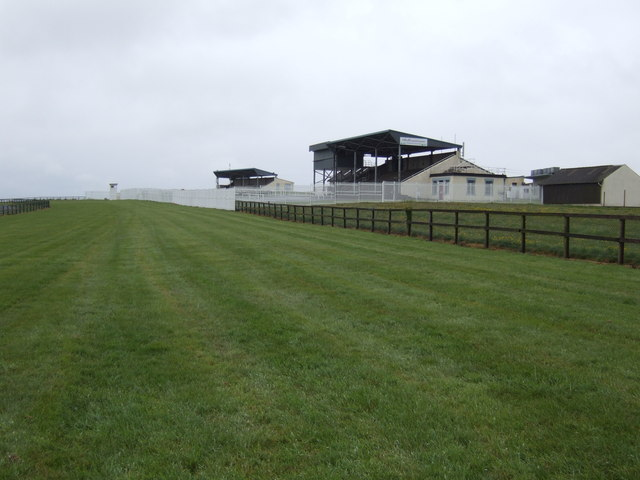
Bellewstown Race Course, where the coup took place.

The Yellow Sam betting coup was a successful sports betting coup, widely remembered within Irish and British thoroughbred horse racing.

It happened at Bellewstown racecourse on 26 June 1975, and was orchestrated by Bernard Joseph (Barney) Curley, an Irish professional gambler, philanthropist behind a charity for impoverished children in Zambia (which he set up after his son's death in 1995), former trainer, former Jesuit seminarian, failed pub owner, former pop group manager, and entrepreneur. By taking advantage of an under-handicapped horse and the lack of easy communications between the Bellewstown racing course and off-course bookmakers, Curley made a profit of over IR£300,000 (>€1.7m adjusted for inflation) – one of the largest betting coups in Irish history.

Barney Curley again made headlines when four horses linked to him won on 22 January 2014, and were estimated to have cost bookmakers "something in the region of £2 million", reportedly just the latest of many successes since the Yellow Sam coup.

== The coup ==
Yellow Sam was a "slow but steady" horse bought by Curley and was given his name from his father's nickname at the races. Curley instructed the horse's trainer, Liam Brennan, to train Yellow Sam specifically for the somewhat obscure annual National Hunt race at Bellewstown, featuring mostly amateur jockeys. To ensure that the horse would run at least once with a much lighter handicap than would normally be the case, Curley first ran the horse in a series of races on other tracks in unfavourable conditions.

Curley spent weeks developing the plan and putting people in place. On the day of the race, Yellow Sam's starting price was 20–1, but if large sums of money were being placed on the horse, that figure would drop quickly, drastically reducing the coup's potential take. It was for this reason that Yellow Sam was to race at Bellewstown specifically, as the track was serviced by just two telephone lines, one public telephone box and a private telephone line belonging to the Extel company which supplied racing data to betting shops. The Extel line was put out of use [probably cut] early in the day leaving just one telephone line available to communicate to the course bookies who determined the starting prices for the participants.

Dozens of Curley's friends, acquaintances, and paid runners stood in bookmaker's shops across the country with between £50 and £300 and sealed instructions to be opened upon receiving a call. None of the runners knew beforehand which horse had been prepared, or in which race it was to run. Curley called six or seven of his people at 2.50 pm, ten minutes before the race was to start, and instructed them to each call ten to twenty others. In all, Curley invested just over £15,000, his entire savings, in the gamble. Twenty-five minutes before the race was about to start, and fifteen minutes before the bets were to be placed, Benny O'Hanlon, a friend of Curley's in on the plot, walked into the telephone booth and pretended to place a call to a dying aunt in a non-existent hospital. His act was convincing, as the queue behind him waiting to use the telephone sympathetically allowed him to continue talking for half an hour, while off-course bookies desperately trying to lay off their liabilities struggled in vain to contact their counterparts on the course.

Curley had already built up something of a reputation during his years as a professional gambler, and knew that his presence at the course was likely to cause concern amongst the bookies, and possibly give away the coup before the off. Still, with so much at stake he wanted to see the race first-hand, so he crept into the centre of the course and watched the race concealed in a thicket of gorse. The gamble succeeded, with Yellow Sam winning the 13-hurdle race by two and a half lengths. Since nothing about the coup had been illegal, the bookmakers were forced to pay out the full IR£ 300,000 (>€ 1.7m adjusted for inflation). They did, however, pay out the winnings in single notes, filling 108 bags.

== Aftermath ==
The coup made Barney Curley widely known throughout Ireland and the United Kingdom, and made headlines in many Irish and British national newspapers and television reports. To this day, it continues to be listed as one of the greatest betting coups of all time. Curley invested his earnings in a stable of horses which he continued to have trained for specific gambles, and in the purchase of Middleton Park House, a mansion in Mullingar, County Westmeath – for which he later ran a raffle of dubious legality (though his jail sentence for illegally running a lottery was overturned on appeal), earning him over £1m.

Irish bookmakers amended their rulebook following the coup to require that bets of over £100 be placed at least half an hour before the start of the race. Bellewstown Race Course itself played up the coup in later years, and in 2005 ran the "Seamus Murphy Yellow Sam 30th Anniversary Hurdle", inviting Barney Curley and Liam Brennan to observe the celebrations.

Yellow Sam continued to run in other races, and in his autobiography, Curley reported having earned a further £ 700,000 in bets on the horse before it was retired.

Barney Curley again made headlines when four horses linked to him won on 22 January 2014, and were widely reported to have cost bookmakers "millions", with a spokesman for British bookmakers Coral admitting they had cost Coral "a six-figure payout" and estimating "the industry has been hit for something in the region of £2million". Irish bookmakers Paddy Power "reported losses of more than €1 million". This was reportedly just the latest of many successes since the Yellow Sam coup, including a 2010 coup "that netted more than a £1 million".
