= Shane Kelly (jockey) =

Irish jockey

Shane Kelly is an Irish jockey. He is a native of Cloone, County Leitrim.

He was trained at the RACE academy in the Curragh, County Kildare. He is a former Irish Amateur Jockey Champion.

He is based in the UK and has had over 300 winners to date.

On 22 January 2014, he rode two winners on the same day as part of a successful betting coup organised by gambler Barney Curley. Betting on a 4 horse winning accumulator netted approximately 4 million pounds.
