= Jason Watson (jockey) =

British jockey

Personal information
- Born: May 2000 (age 26)
- Occupation: Jockey

Horse racing career
- Sport: Horse racing

Major racing wins
- Major races Fillies' Mile (2019); Cesarewitch Handicap (2019); Preis von Europa (2019); Stewards' Cup (2018); Premio Lydia Tesio (2018)

Significant horses
- Quadrilateral

Jason Watson (born May 2000) is a Group 1-winning British jockey who was Champion Apprentice in 2018.

Watson was born in Brighton, to a postman father. He started riding at a riding school in Lewes at age 6, under the tutelage of ex-jump jockey Ray Goldstein. He left school at 13 to be home-schooled.

His first ride was on Breakheart, trained by Gary Moore, at Kempton in February 2017. He came second. His first win came on Many Dreams, again for Moore, at Salisbury in May, his fourth ride. In total in 2017 he rode two winners from 41 rides.

In August 2018, he won his first major race, the Stewards' Cup at Goodwood on the Hugo Palmer trained Gifted Master, and began to be noticed for the number of competitive handicaps he was winning at major courses. His main source of winners was Andrew Balding, but he rode for at least 55 different yards. He was coached by former Derby winning jockey John Reid.

He recorded 77 wins between 5 May and 20 October, which placed him tenth in the overall jockey rankings, and won him the Champion Apprentice title. His total was higher than the previous three champions under the newer, shorter jockeys' championship season and the highest since Paul Hanagan who rode 81 in 2002. He went on to register 111 wins for the calendar year, riding out his claim by early October, and his success led some to suggest he "could be out of the ordinary" and led to bookmakers cutting his odds to be the 2019 Champion Jockey outright. On collecting his trophy for Champion Apprentice, he stated that was his ambition. He finished the season with a win in his first group race - the Premio Lydia Tesio on God Given for Luca Cumani.

Watson rode as first jockey for trainer Roger Charlton from the start of 2019 until July 2021. The partnership did not begin well as he was thrown from his horse in a race at Kempton Park in January 2019. He fractured four vertebrae, three in his neck and one in his spine. Recovery took three months and a five-day a week rehabilitation programme. After recovery, he won two Group 2 races in France over the summer and a second Group 1 in the Preis von Europa on Aspetar. In consecutive days in October 2019, he won his first British Group 1 - the Fillies' Mile on Quadrilateral - and the Cesarewitch Handicap on Stratum.

== Major wins ==
(United Kingdom) Great Britain

- Fillies' Mile - Quadrilateral (2019)
- Queen Elizabeth II Stakes - Cicero's Gift (2025)

Germany

- Preis von Europa - Aspetar (2019)

Italy

- Premio Lydia Tesio - God Given (2018)

(United Kingdom) Great Britain

- Balmoral Handicap - Shelir (2022)
