= Midday (horse) =

British-bred Thoroughbred racehorse

- Racing colours of Khalid Abdullah
- Sire: Oasis Dream
- Grandsire: Green Desert
- Dam: Midsummer
- Damsire: Kingmambo
- Sex: mare
- Foaled: 2006
- Country: United Kingdom
- Colour: Bay
- Breeder: Khalid Abdullah
- Owner: Khalid Abdullah
- Trainer: Henry Cecil
- Record: 23: 9-7-3
- Earnings: £2,239,007

Major wins
- Lingfield Oaks Trial (2009); Nassau Stakes (2009, 2010, 2011); Breeders' Cup Filly & Mare Turf (2009); Yorkshire Oaks (2010); Prix Vermeille (2010); Middleton Stakes (2011); Timeform rating: 126
- Last updated on 2 August 2023

Midday (foaled 2006) is a British Thoroughbred racehorse and broodmare. She won nine of her 23 starts, including the Group 1 Nassau Stakes three times (unequalled), the Yorkshire Oaks, Prix Vermeille and the Breeders' Cup Filly and Mare Turf. She ran finished second in the 2009 Epsom Oaks and in the Breeders' Cup Filly and Mare Turf in 2010.

== Background ==
Midday is a bay mare bred and owned by Khalid Abdullah. She was trained throughout her racing career by Henry Cecil at his Warren Place stable in Newmarket, Suffolk

She was sired by the top-class 2-year-old and sprinter Oasis Dream and is out of the Kingmambo mare Midsummer.

== Racing career ==
Midday ran four times as a juvenile in 2008, recording her only success in a maiden race over one mile at Newmarket Racecourse on 19 September.

In 2010 Midday won the Lingfield Oaks Trial and was placed behind Sariska in both the Epsom Oaks and the Irish Oaks before taking the Nassau Stakes. In autumn she ran third in the Prix Vermeille before being shipped to California, where she won the Breeders' Cup Filly & Mare Turf.

As a four-year-old Midday was beaten by Saiska in the Middleton Stakes but then reeled off a hat-trick of Group 1 wins in the Nassau Stakes, Yorkshire Oaks and Prix Vermeille.

Midday remained in training in 2011 when she won the Middleton Stakes as well as a third Nassau Stakes.

== Stud record ==
Midday has produced three foals to date;

- 2013 - Midterm, sired by Galileo, won three races, including the G3 Sandown Classic Trial
- 2014 - Mori, by Frankel, has won twice, including the Listed Height of Fashion Stakes
- 2015 - Midi, by Frankel
