= Henry Cecil =

British racehorse trainer (1943–2013)

Sir Henry Richard Amherst Cecil
- Cecil at the 2011 Ebor Festival

Personal information
- Born: 11 January 1943 Aberdeen, Scotland
- Died: 11 June 2013 (aged 70) Cambridge, England
- Occupation: Horse trainer

Horse racing career
- Sport: Horse racing

Major racing wins
- British Classic Race wins: 2,000 Guineas (3); 1,000 Guineas (6); Epsom Oaks (8); Epsom Derby (4); St. Leger Stakes (4)

Honours
- Champion Trainer (1976, 1978, 1979, 1982, 1984, 1985, 1987, 1988, 1990, 1993); Sir Henry Cecil Stakes at Newmarket Racecourse; British Champions Series Hall of Fame (2022)

Significant horses
- Wollow, Kris, Le Moss, Ardross, Diesis, Slip Anchor, Oh So Sharp, Reference Point, Belmez, Indian Skimmer, Michelozzo, Commander in Chief, King's Theatre, Snow Bride, Ramruma, Bosra Sham, Reams of Verse, Oath, Midday, Twice Over, Frankel

Sir Henry Richard Amherst Cecil (11 January 1943 – 11 June 2013) was a British flat racing horse trainer. Cecil was very successful, becoming Champion Trainer ten times and training 25 domestic Classic winners. These comprised four winners of the Derby, eight winners of the Oaks, six winners of the 1,000 Guineas, three of the 2,000 Guineas and four winners of the St Leger Stakes. His 1000 Guineas and Oaks successes made him particularly renowned for his success with fillies. He was noted for his mastery at Royal Ascot, where he trained 75 winners.

Describing his approach to training, Cecil told The Daily Telegraph: "I do everything by instinct really, not by the book. I like to think I’ve got a feeling for and understand my horses, that they tell me what to do really."

Cecil was knighted for services to horse racing in the Queen's 2011 Birthday Honours.

== Background and education ==
Cecil was born on 11 January 1943 in a hospital near Aberdeen, ten minutes ahead of his twin brother David. His father, Lt. Hon. Henry Kerr Auchmuty Cecil, younger brother of the 3rd Lord Amherst of Hackney, had been killed in action with the Parachute Regiment in North Africa shortly before Cecil was born. His mother, Rohays Cecil, was the daughter of Major-General Sir James Burnett of Leys, 13th Baronet, owner of Crathes Castle, Aberdeenshire.

When he was still a baby, Cecil's mother married Captain Cecil Boyd-Rochfort, who was British flat racing Champion Trainer five times and who trained for, among others, George VI.

Cecil and his brother were educated at Sunningdale School and at Canford School, Dorset. He described himself as "very late-maturing and backward", saying that he was the first boy from his prep school ever to fail Common Entrance to Eton. After school, the twins went to work at the Earl of Derby's Woodland Stud in Newmarket, Suffolk, and at other studs overseas. They completed their education at the Royal Agricultural College, Cirencester.

== Training career ==
=== Early career and success ===
From 1964 to 1968 Cecil worked as an assistant at his stepfather's Freemason Lodge stable. He took out his own licence to train in 1969 and that year had his first winner with Celestial Cloud at Ripon on 17 May, with Wolver Hollow winning the Eclipse Stakes in July to give Cecil his first Group One success. He had his first winner at Royal Ascot the following year when Parthenon won the Queen Alexandra Stakes. In his early years Cecil received the support of Lord Howard de Walden, a noted breeder and owner of racehorses.

The languid, dandyish Cecil, noted for his flair in clothing, went on to remarkable achievements. In 1973 he tasted his first Classic success in Ireland when Cloonagh won the Irish 1,000 Guineas and in 1975 he won his first English Classic with Bolkonski at the 2,000 Guineas. He won three 1,000 Guineas and a further 2,000 Guineas before winning his first Epsom Derby in 1985 with Slip Anchor. In 1976 he had taken over the running of Warren Place in Newmarket from Sir Noel Murless, the father of his first wife, and he turned the stables into what has been called "the most glamorous yard in Europe", setting it at "the pinnacle of British racing". In 1999 he won three of the five Classic races and finished second in the other two. Prince Ahmed bin Salman, the owner of Oath, one of Cecil's Derby winners, once said: "Winning Classics is easy. Just buy a horse and send it to Henry Cecil".

Among the jockeys to ride for Cecil, the most notable have been Steve Cauthen, Lester Piggott, Joe Mercer, Kieren Fallon, Pat Eddery and, later, Tom Queally.

=== Period in the wilderness ===
After years of success, Cecil experienced a dramatic fall from grace. In the space of a few years a number of owner-breeders with long-standing relationships with Cecil died, including Louis Freedman, Jim Joel and Lord Howard de Walden. His first wife, Julie, and his head lad, Paddy Rudkin, left and in 1995 Cecil's relationship with Sheikh Mohammed broke down, with the owner removing overnight the 40 horses he had in training at Cecil's stable. Sheikh Mohammed suggested at the time that he and Cecil had disagreed about the fitness of one of his thoroughbreds, Mark of Esteem, to run at Ascot—a disagreement which Cecil had made public. Cecil maintained that they were still "great friends" and had not fallen out. A number of Cecil's most notable horses had been owned by Sheikh Mohammed, including Oh So Sharp, Diminuendo, Indian Skimmer and Belmez. The incident has been flagged as the 'end of an era' in Cecil's career.

Between July 2000 and October 2006, Cecil failed to train a winner in any Group One race. In 2005 he saddled just a dozen winners overall. His stable of 200 horses shrank to barely 50 and Cecil began to talk of retirement. His second marriage publicly collapsed, his twin brother David died of cancer in 2000, his yard was losing money, and in 2006 it was revealed that he was himself undergoing treatment for stomach cancer. Cecil recalled being on the Heath at Newmarket and overhearing someone say, "That's Henry Cecil. He should have retired a long time ago". His stable was supported almost exclusively by the loyalty of Prince Khaled Abdulla.

=== Return to success and Frankel ===
When Cecil's Light Shift won the Oaks in 2007, it marked a return to form. This victory was his 24th English Classic winner and his eighth victory in the race, seven years after his previous winner. The season before he had barely made it into the top 100 trainers in the country. "I might not be [competitive] on the outside", Cecil told The Independent. "But I am on the inside, definitely—underneath, very competitive. Always have been. We like winning, you know. We do like winning. It's what motivates you. Nobody likes failure. Your horses are running badly, or they're no good, you get jealous of everybody else. It's not quite so much fun, is it?" The 2011 season was Cecil's best for 10 years. He saddled 55 winners, securing prize money totaling more than £2.7 million.

Cecil's success in 2011 was partly due to his training of the Khalid Abdullah-owned Frankel. In the 2010 season Frankel won the Royal Lodge Stakes and Group One Dewhurst Stakes. The following year he continued unbeaten, winning the Greenham Stakes, the 2,000 Guineas, the St. James's Palace Stakes at Royal Ascot, the Sussex Stakes and the Queen Elizabeth II Stakes. His six length victory in the 2,000 Guineas was described as "one of the greatest displays on a British racecourse". After his win in the Sussex Stakes Cecil himself described Frankel as "the best horse I've ever seen". Timeform and the International Federation of Horseracing Authorities rated him the best horse in the world. In his four-year-old season Frankel won the Group One Lockinge Stakes at Newbury before an eleven length victory in the Queen Anne Stakes at Royal Ascot, described in one national newspaper as "possibly the best single performance by any horse, on any track, since three Arabian stallions were imported into Britain to found the thoroughbred breed in the early years of the 18th century". Timeform raised their rating to 147, making Frankel the highest rated horse in their history. He won a second Sussex Stakes, at odds of 1–20, and then stepped up in distance to win by seven lengths the Juddmonte International Stakes at York over 10 furlongs. In October 2012 Frankel won the Champion Stakes at Ascot to finish his career unbeaten. "He's the best I've ever had, the best I've ever seen", Cecil told the BBC after the race, "I'd be very surprised if there's ever been anything better."

Author Jilly Cooper consulted Cecil as part of her research for her novel Mount!

== Personal life ==
In 1966, Cecil married Julie Murless, the daughter of trainer Sir Noel Murless. The couple had two children but divorced in 1990. Cecil had been conducting an affair with Natalie Payne, whom he married two years later. When they met Cecil was 46 and his future second wife was 22.

Cecil's second marriage broke down very publicly. Newspaper reports alleged that his wife was being unfaithful, including with an unidentified jockey, while a front-page story in the News of the World suggested that Cecil had stayed at the Grand Hotel in Brighton with an £800-a-night prostitute. Days after the story broke Cecil dismissed his stable jockey Kieren Fallon for "personal reasons". Fallon issued a statement denying that he was involved in the breakdown of the Cecil marriage and began legal proceedings for breach of contract; the case was settled out of court. Cecil and his wife divorced in 2002.

In 2008, Cecil married Jane McKeown.

Cecil continued to receive treatment for stomach cancer. He was unable to be at Goodwood for Frankel's second victory in the Sussex Stakes in August 2012, but did attend the Ebor Festival at York later that month, describing Frankel's victory in the International Stakes as having made him feel "20 years better".

== Death ==
Cecil died of cancer on 11 June 2013 in hospital in Cambridge. He was 70. Racing broadcaster Derek Thompson called him "the greatest trainer of all time" while trainer Paul Nicholls referred to Cecil as "a true legend". Clare Balding, on Twitter, referred to Cecil as "one of the true greats and a gentleman. Frankel his crowning glory." Royal Ascot paid its respects to Cecil with a minute's silence before the opening race of the five-day meeting at 2.20 pm on 18 June 2013.

== Major wins ==
United Kingdom

- 1,000 Guineas – (6) – One in a Million (1979), Fairy Footsteps (1981), Oh So Sharp (1985), Bosra Sham (1996), Sleepytime (1997), Wince (1999)
- 2,000 Guineas – (3) – Bolkonski (1975), Wollow (1976), Frankel (2011)
- Ascot Gold Cup – (5) – Le Moss (1979, 1980), Ardross (1981, 1982), Paean (1987)
- Champion Stakes – (5) – Indian Skimmer (1988), Bosra Sham (1996), Twice Over (2009, 2010), Frankel (2012)
- Coronation Stakes – (5) – Roussalka (1975), One in a Million (1979), Chalon (1982), Chimes of Freedom (1990), Kissing Cousin (1994)
- Derby – (4) – Slip Anchor (1985), Reference Point (1987), Commander in Chief (1993), Oath (1999)
- Dewhurst Stakes – (3) – Wollow (1975), Diesis (1982), Frankel (2010)
- Eclipse Stakes – (4) – Wolver Hollow (1969), Wollow (1976), Gunner B (1978), Twice Over (2010)
- Falmouth Stakes – (3) – Chalon (1982), Chimes of Freedom (1990), Timepiece (2011)
- Fillies' Mile – (6) – Formulate (1978), Oh So Sharp (1984), Diminuendo (1987), Tessla (1988), Bosra Sham (1995), Reams of Verse (1996)
- International Stakes – (4) – Wollow (1976), Royal Anthem (1999), Twice Over (2011) Frankel (2012)
- King George VI and Queen Elizabeth Stakes – (3) – Reference Point (1987), Belmez (1990), King's Theatre (1994)
- Lockinge Stakes – (4) – Kris (1980), Belmont Bay (1981), Prismatic (1985), Frankel (2012)
- Middle Park Stakes – (2) – Cajun (1981), Diesis (1982)
- Nassau Stakes – (8) – Roussalka (1975, 1976), Connaught Bridge (1979), Nom de Plume (1987), Lyphard's Delta (1993), Midday (2009, 2010, 2011)
- Oaks – (8) – Oh So Sharp (1985), Diminuendo (1988), Snow Bride (1989), Lady Carla (1996), Reams of Verse (1997), Ramruma (1999), Love Divine (2000), Light Shift (2007)
- Prince of Wales's Stakes – (5) – Lucky Wednesday (1977), Gunner B (1978), Perpendicular (1992), Placerville (1993), Bosra Sham (1997)
- Queen Anne Stakes – (5) – Belmont Bay (1981), Mr Fluorocarbon (1982), Valiyar (1983), Trojan Fen (1984), Frankel (2012)
- Queen Elizabeth II Stakes – (2) – Kris (1979), Frankel (2011)
- Racing Post Trophy – (10) – Approval (1969), Take Your Place (1975), Hello Gorgeous (1979), Dunbeath (1982), Lanfranco (1984), Reference Point (1986), Be My Chief (1989), Peter Davies (1990), Armiger (1992), King's Theatre (1993)
- St. James's Palace Stakes – (5) – Bolkonski (1975), Kris (1979), Shavian (1990), Dr Fong (1998), Frankel (2011)
- St. Leger – (4) – Light Cavalry (1980), Oh So Sharp (1985), Reference Point (1987), Michelozzo (1989)
- Sun Chariot Stakes – (2) – Home on the Range (1981), Indian Skimmer (1988)
- Sussex Stakes – (7) – Bolkonski (1975), Wollow (1976), Kris (1979), Distant View (1994), Ali-Royal (1997), Frankel (2011, 2012)
- Yorkshire Oaks – (5) – Connaught Bridge (1979), Diminuendo (1988), Catchascatchcan (1998), Ramruma (1999), Midday (2010)

Canada

- Canadian International Stakes – (1) – Royal Anthem (1998)

France

- Critérium de Saint-Cloud – (1) – Passage of Time (2006)
- Grand Critérium – (1) – Tenby (1992)
- Grand Prix de Paris – (1) – Beat Hollow (2000)
- Prix de Diane – (2) – Indian Skimmer (1987), Rafha (1990)
- Prix de la Forêt – (1) – Salse (1988)
- Prix d'Ispahan – (1) – Indian Skimmer (1989)
- Prix du Jockey Club – (1) – Old Vic (1989)
- Prix Maurice de Gheest – (1) – Pursuit of Love (1992)
- Prix du Moulin de Longchamp – (1) – All at Sea (1992)
- Prix Royal-Oak – (2) – Ardross (1981), El Cuite (1986)
- Prix Saint-Alary – (1) – Indian Skimmer (1987)
- Prix Vermeille – (1) – Midday (2010)

Ireland

- Irish 1,000 Guineas – (1) – Cloonagh (1973)
- Irish Champion Stakes – (1) – Indian Skimmer (1988)
- Irish Derby – (2) – Old Vic (1989), Commander in Chief (1993)
- Irish Oaks – (3) – Diminuendo (1988, dead heat), Alydaress (1989), Ramruma (1999)
- Matron Stakes – (1) – Chachamaidee (2012)
- Moyglare Stud Stakes – (1) – Chimes of Freedom (1989)
- Tattersalls Gold Cup – (1) – Shiva (1999)

Italy

- Gran Premio d'Italia – (1) – El Cuite (1986)
- Premio Roma – (2) – Irvine (1972), Orban (1987)
- Premio Vittorio di Capua – (1) – Star Cutter (1986)

United States

- Breeders' Cup Filly & Mare Turf – (1) – Midday (2009)
- Flower Bowl Invitational Stakes – (1) – Yashmak (1997)
