= Roderic O'Connor (horse) =

Irish-bred Thoroughbred racehorse

- Racing silks of Susan Magnier
- Sire: Galileo
- Grandsire: Sadler's Wells
- Dam: Secret Garden
- Damsire: Danehill
- Sex: Stallion
- Foaled: 2008
- Country: Ireland
- Colour: Bay
- Breeder: Swettenham Stud
- Owner: Mrs John Magnier
- Trainer: Aidan O'Brien
- Record: 9: 3-1-1
- Earnings: £393,444

Major wins
- Critérium International (2010); Irish 2,000 Guineas (2011)

Roderic O'Connor (foaled 4 April 2008) is an Irish Thoroughbred racehorse. He won the Critérium International as a two-year-old and the Irish 2,000 Guineas as a three-year-old. He is owned by Mrs John Magnier and was trained by Aidan O'Brien. He stood as a stallion at Ballyhane Stud. He now stands as a Stallion at Poonawalla Stud Farms, India.

== Breeding ==
Roderic O'Connor is the son of Galileo, who won The Derby, Irish Derby and King George VI and Queen Elizabeth Stakes and multiple Champion sire. Galileo's sire was Sadler's Wells, winner of the Eclipse Stakes and Irish Champion Stakes and multiple Champion sire. Roderic O'Connor's dam, Secret Garden won twice, including a listed race. Secret Garden's sire was Danehill, winner of the Sprint Cup and Champion sire.

== Racing career ==
=== 2010: two-year-old season ===
Roderic O'Connor finished third on his racecourse debut when starting at 20/1 for a seven-furlong maiden at Leopardstown. He then won a maiden race at the Curragh, beating Master of Hounds by 2½ lengths. In the Dewhurst Stakes he took on Frankel and Dream Ahead. Starting as the 25/1 outsider he finished second, 2¼ lengths behind Frankel. In his final start as a two-year-old he travelled to France for the Critérium International. He started the race the 5/2 second favourite and was ridden by Johnny Murtagh. He was ridden prominently during the early stages of the race and then quickened clear in the finishing straight. In the closing stages he drifted first left and then right, but he ran on again to win by 1½ lengths from Salto.

=== 2011: three-year-old-season ===
He started his three-year-old season 2000 Guineas and was amongst the favourites. Dewhurst winner Frankel was the hot favourite at 1/2, then came Roderic O'Connor and National Stakes winner Pathfork at 8/1. Racing Post Trophy winner Casamento started at 11/1. Frankel pulled away in the opening stages of the race and was never caught. Ridden by Ryan Moore, Roderic O'Connor was near the front of the chasing group, but faded with three furlongs still to run. He finished 38 lengths behind the winner in eleventh. Roderic O'Connor then took on 2000 Guineas runner-up Dubawi Gold in the Irish 2,000 Guineas. Under Joseph O'Brien (son of trainer Aidan O'Brien) he led from the start. Dubawi Gold closed in the final stages of the race, but could not catch him and Roderic O'Connor went on to win by ¾ length. This was Joseph O'Brien's first Group 1 win. He then finished eighth in the Prix du Jockey Club, sixth in the Irish Derby and fifth in the Irish Champion Stakes.

== Assessment ==
He was officially rated as the 136th best horse in the world in 2011.

== Stud career ==
At the end of the 2011 season Roderic O'Connor was retired to stud. He stood as a stallion at Ballyhane Stud and also shuttled to Brazil during the 2012 season. His 2012 stud fee is €9,000. He was later acquired by Poonawalla Stud Farm to stand as a stallion in India.

Notable Progenies in India :

1. A STAR IS BORN(b c 2018 x Angel Dust By Win Legend(JPN))- The Indian 2000 Guineas (Gr.1), The Indian Champion Cup (Gr.1); 2nd -The Pune Derby (Gr.1), The Indian Derby (Gr.1), The Maharaja's Gold Cup (Gr.2), The Calcutta Gold Cup (Gr.2);
2. KAMILAH(b f 2018 x My Lakshmi By Ace(IRE))- The Calcutta 1000 Guineas (Gr.3); 2nd- The Calcutta Oaks (Gr.3), The Calcutta Debby Stakes (Gr.1); 3rd- Threptin Fillies & Mares Stakes (Gr.3);
3. THUNBERG(b f 2019 x Ice Glacier By Arazan(IRE))- 2nd- The Indian 1,000 Guineas (Gr.1); 3rd - The Indian Oaks (Gr.1);

== Pedigree ==
Pedigree of Roderic O'Connor, bay colt, 2008
Sire Galileo (IRE) b. 1998	Sadler's Wells b. 1981	Northern Dancer* b. 1961	Nearctic
Sire Galileo (IRE) b. 1998	Sadler's Wells b. 1981	Northern Dancer* b. 1961	Natalma
Sire Galileo (IRE) b. 1998	Sadler's Wells b. 1981	Fairy Bridge b. 1975	Bold Reason
Sire Galileo (IRE) b. 1998	Sadler's Wells b. 1981	Fairy Bridge b. 1975	Special
Sire Galileo (IRE) b. 1998	Urban Sea ch. 1989	Miswaki ch. 1978	Mr. Prospector
Sire Galileo (IRE) b. 1998	Urban Sea ch. 1989	Miswaki ch. 1978	Hopespringseternal
Sire Galileo (IRE) b. 1998	Urban Sea ch. 1989	Allegretta ch. 1978	Lombard
Sire Galileo (IRE) b. 1998	Urban Sea ch. 1989	Allegretta ch. 1978	Anatevka
Dam Secret Garden (IRE) b. 1999	Danehill b. 1986	Danzig b. 1977	Northern Dancer*
Dam Secret Garden (IRE) b. 1999	Danehill b. 1986	Danzig b. 1977	Pas De Nom
Dam Secret Garden (IRE) b. 1999	Danehill b. 1986	Razyana b. 1981	His Majesty
Dam Secret Garden (IRE) b. 1999	Danehill b. 1986	Razyana b. 1981	Spring Adieu
Dam Secret Garden (IRE) b. 1999	Chalamont ch. 1993	Kris ch. 1976	Sharpen Up
Dam Secret Garden (IRE) b. 1999	Chalamont ch. 1993	Kris ch. 1976	Doubly Sure
Dam Secret Garden (IRE) b. 1999	Chalamont ch. 1993	Durtal b. 1974	Lyphard
Dam Secret Garden (IRE) b. 1999	Chalamont ch. 1993	Durtal b. 1974	Derna

Note: b. = Bay, br. = Brown, ch. = Chestnut

* Roderic O'Connor is inbred 3x4 to Northern Dancer, meaning that the stallion appears once in the third generation and once in the fourth generation of his pedigree.
