= Frankie McBride =

Irish country and folk singer (born 1944)

- Born: 1944 (age 81–82); Omagh, County Tyrone, Northern Ireland
- Genres: Country music, folk music, gospel
- Occupation: Singer

Frankie McBride (born 1944, Omagh, County Tyrone, Northern Ireland) is an Irish country and folk singer, who rose to stardom in the second half of the 1960s.

McBride's hit single, "Five Little Fingers", reached No. 2 on the Irish charts and No. 19 on the UK Singles Chart in 1967. A full-length self-titled album hit No. 29 on the UK Albums Chart the following year. The song was noted for its blending of rock and roll and country, a trend which became increasingly acceptable to mainstream audiences in the late 1960s.

McBride also recorded an album of gospel music in Nashville, Tennessee with Gloria Smith in 1981.

== Discography ==
=== Albums ===
- Frankie McBride (1968)
- Lost Loves And Loneliness (1974)
- Why Me Lord (1981)

=== Singles ===
- 1967: "Five Little Fingers"
