= Kind (horse) =

Irish-bred Thoroughbred racehorse

- Racing colours of Khalid Abdulla
- Sire: Danehill
- Grandsire: Danzig
- Dam: Rainbow Lake
- Damsire: Rainbow Quest
- Sex: Mare
- Foaled: 21 April 2001
- Died: 8 March 2021 (aged 19)
- Country: Ireland
- Colour: Bay
- Breeder: Juddmonte Farms
- Owner: Khalid Abdulla
- Trainer: Roger Charlton
- Jockey: Richard Hughes
- Record: 13: 6-0-4
- Earnings: £72,402

Major wins
- Flower of Scotland Stakes (2004); Kilvington Stakes (2005)

Kind (21 April 2001 – 8 March 2021) was an Irish-bred, British-trained Thoroughbred racehorse. She won six of her thirteen races, including the Listed Flower of Scotland Stakes and Kilvington Stakes, as well as being placed in the Group 3 Ballyogan Stakes. After retiring from racing she became one of Juddmonte Farms' top broodmares, foaling the undefeated, 10-time Group 1 winner Frankel. All of her first five foals won races, including the Group winners Bullet Train and Noble Mission. Kind was trained by Roger Charlton and owned by Khalid Abdulla. She died on 8 March 2021 following complications from foaling.

== Background ==
Kind was a bay mare who was bred by Juddmonte Farms and foaled on 21 April 2001. She was sired by Danehill who won the Haydock Sprint Cup in 1989. He went on to become a leading sire and was champion sire of Great Britain and Ireland in 2005, 2006 and 2007. Danehill also sired Danehill Dancer, Dansili, Duke of Marmalade, Dylan Thomas, George Washington and Rock of Gibraltar. Kind's dam is Rainbow Lake, a daughter of Rainbow Quest. Rainbow Lake won three of her six starts, including the Ballymacoll Stud Stakes and Lancashire Oaks. As a broodmare she produced several other winners including Powerscourt. Kind was trained by Roger Charlton.

== Racing career ==
=== 2003: Two-year-old season ===
Kind made her racecourse debut on 5 September 2003 in a six-furlong maiden race at Kempton Park. She was slowly away at the start, but ran on strongly in the closing stages to finish in third place, about two and a half lengths behind winner Unshooda. One month later Kind started as the odds-on favourite for another six-furlong maiden at Newmarket. She was slowly away again and finished fourth, four lengths behind winner Valjarv.

=== 2004: Three-year-old season ===
In her first start as a three-year-old, on 14 April 2004, Kind stepped up in distance for a seven-furlong maiden at Newmarket. This time she got away from the start well and led the group that was racing on the far side of the course. She was overtaken near the finish and finished third, with the race being won by the filly Relaxed. On 22 May, Kind returned to Kempton Park, where racing against colts for the first time, she started as the odds-on favourite. She took the lead and went clear, with the other horses being unable to challenge her. Kind won the race by six lengths from Farewell Gift. Eleven days later she won again at Kempton, this time beating Swinbrook by a head over six furlongs. Racing at Kempton Park for the fourth time in her career on 23 June, Kind recorded her third successive victory. This was in the Williamhillradio.com Classified Stakes, where after tracking the leaders in the early stages, she took the lead with one furlong still to run and won by half a length from Celtic Thunder.

In July Kind raced in her first Handicap, the Vibe FM Fillies' Rates Stakes at Newmarket. As with her previous race, she followed the front runners and took the lead one furlong out, this time winning by a short-head from Valjarv. In her final race as a three-year-old, she stepped up in class for the Listed Flower of Scotland Stakes at Hamilton. The pre-race favourite was Enchantment, who had finished fourth in her two previous runs in Listed races. Kind was priced at 8/1. Ridden by regular jockey Richard Hughes, she raced near the front of the field of eleven, just behind the leaders, in the early stages and took the lead inside the final furlong. She won the race by half a length from Autumn Pearl, with Frascati a further three-quarters of a length behind in third place.

=== 2005: Four-year-old season ===
Kind started the 2005 season in the Landsdown Fillies' Stakes at Bath, where she finished third behind winner Indian Maiden. In May, Kind contested the Kilvington Stakes at Nottingham, where she started at the price of 3/1. She took the lead with over one furlong left to run and held on to win by half a length from Forever Phoenix, with pre-race favourite Ringmoor Down a further three-quarters of a length back in third place. On 1 June, Kind started in her first Group race, the six-furlong Ballyogan Stakes. She started the race as favourite and Richard Hughes placed her in about third place in the early stages of the race. She took the lead of the race in the penultimate furlong, but was overtaken by La Cucaracha before the field entered the final furlong. Kind finished the race in third place, less than one length behind winner La Cucaracha. In the Summer Stakes Kind raced near the rear of the field and could not challenge the leaders, finishing in fifth place, with the race being won by Lucky Spin. Kind's final race start came in the Phoenix Sprint Stakes, when she finished fifth again. Throughout her racing career she earned £72,402 in prize money.

== Stud career ==
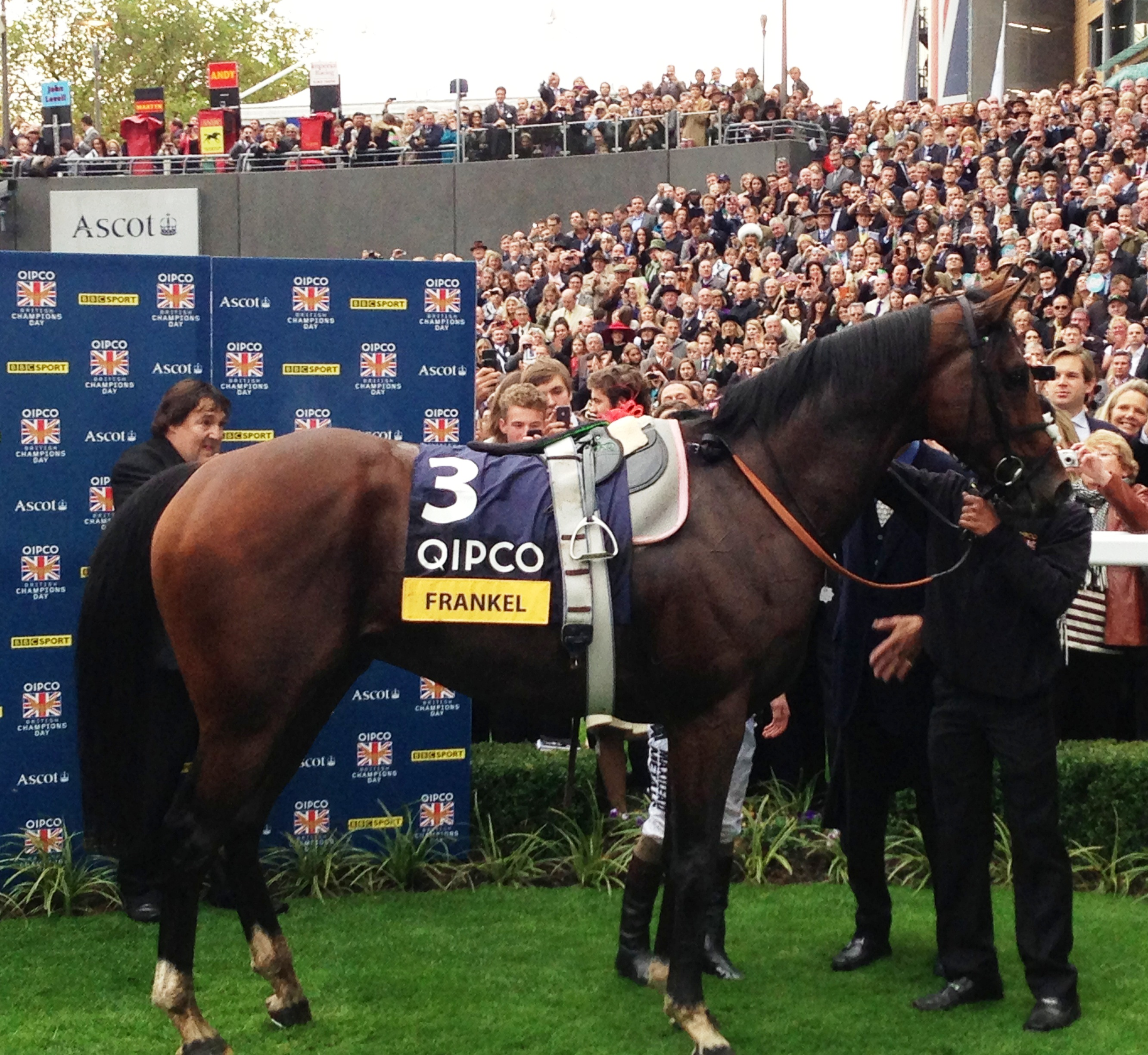
Kind's son Frankel after winning the Champion Stakes

Kind was retired to Juddmonte Farms stud and became a successful broodmare. Her first three foals all won Group races and her first five foals all won at least two races. Her foals were:

- Bullet Train – a bay horse sired by Sadler's Wells and foaled in 2007. He won two races including the Lingfield Derby Trial and £114,824 in prize money. He was later used as Frankel's pacemaker. Bullet Train was retired to stud at the end of 2012 and stands at Wintergreen Farm in Kentucky for a fee of $7,500.
- Frankel – a bay horse sired by Galileo and foaled in 2008. Frankel was undefeated in fourteen starts and won £2,998,302 in prize money. He won the Group 1 Dewhurst Stakes, 2000 Guineas, St James's Palace Stakes, Sussex Stakes twice, Queen Elizabeth II Stakes, Lockinge Stakes, Queen Anne Stakes, International Stakes and Champion Stakes. He was twice named Cartier Horse of the Year and Timeform rated him as the best horse since the start of the company in 1948. Frankel now stands as a stallion at Juddmonte Farm's Banstead Manor Stud for a fee of £200,000.
- Noble Mission – a bay horse sired by Galileo and foaled in 2009. He won nine races including the Newmarket Stakes, Gordon Stakes, Gordon Richards Stakes, Huxley Stakes, Tattersalls Gold Cup, Grand Prix de Saint-Cloud and Champion Stakes and was named Cartier Champion Older Horse in 2014.
- Morpheus – a bay colt sired by Oasis Dream and foaled in 2010, who won three races and finished fourth in the Silver Cambridgeshire Handicap. He was sent to race in the United States in 2014.
- Joyeuse – a bay filly sired by Oasis Dream and foaled in 2011. As a two-year-old she won the Listed Dick Poole Fillies' Stakes and finished third in the Albany Stakes at Royal Ascot and as a three-year-old won the Listed Cecil Frail Stakes.
- Proconsul – a chestnut colt sired by Galileo and foaled in 2013. The full brother to Frankel and Noble Mission was trained by André Fabre in France. He was beaten on both his races in 2016 and was retired to Mickley Stud in Shropshire in January 2017.
- Chiasma – a filly sired by Galileo and foaled in 2018 who was trained by John Gosden and Thady Gosden. She ran five times in 2021, winning once and being placed twice. As a broodmare she has produced the Musidora Stakes winner Legacy Link.
- Kikkuli - a bay horse sired by Kingman and foaled in 2021, in training with Roger Charlton and Harry Charlton. By May 2025 he had raced eight times, winning once and coming second on three occasions.

Kind died on 8 March 2021, a few days after producing the colt foal by Kingman later named Kikkuli.

== Pedigree ==
Pedigree of Kind, bay mare, 2001
Sire Danehill (USA) b. 1986	Danzig (USA) b. 1977	Northern Dancer b. 1961	Nearctic
Sire Danehill (USA) b. 1986	Danzig (USA) b. 1977	Northern Dancer b. 1961	Natalma*
Sire Danehill (USA) b. 1986	Danzig (USA) b. 1977	Pas de Nom b. 1968	Admiral's Voyage
Sire Danehill (USA) b. 1986	Danzig (USA) b. 1977	Pas de Nom b. 1968	Petitioner
Sire Danehill (USA) b. 1986	Razyana (USA) b. 1981	His Majesty b. 1968	Ribot
Sire Danehill (USA) b. 1986	Razyana (USA) b. 1981	His Majesty b. 1968	Flower Bowl
Sire Danehill (USA) b. 1986	Razyana (USA) b. 1981	Spring Adieu b. 1974	Buckpasser
Sire Danehill (USA) b. 1986	Razyana (USA) b. 1981	Spring Adieu b. 1974	Natalma*
Dam Rainbow Lake (GB) b. 1990	Rainbow Quest (USA) b. 1981	Blushing Groom ch. 1974	Red God
Dam Rainbow Lake (GB) b. 1990	Rainbow Quest (USA) b. 1981	Blushing Groom ch. 1974	Runaway Bride
Dam Rainbow Lake (GB) b. 1990	Rainbow Quest (USA) b. 1981	I Will Follow b. 1975	Herbager
Dam Rainbow Lake (GB) b. 1990	Rainbow Quest (USA) b. 1981	I Will Follow b. 1975	Where You Lead
Dam Rainbow Lake (GB) b. 1990	Rockfest (USA) ch. 1979	Stage Door Johnny ch. 1965	Prince John
Dam Rainbow Lake (GB) b. 1990	Rockfest (USA) ch. 1979	Stage Door Johnny ch. 1965	Peroxide Blonde
Dam Rainbow Lake (GB) b. 1990	Rockfest (USA) ch. 1979	Rock Garden II ch. 1970	Roan Rocket
Dam Rainbow Lake (GB) b. 1990	Rockfest (USA) ch. 1979	Rock Garden II ch. 1970	Nasira

Note: b. = Bay, ch. = Chestnut

* Kind is inbred 4 × 4 to Natalma. This means that the mare appears twice in the fourth generation of her pedigree.
