= 2002 Epsom Derby =

- Location: Epsom Downs Racecourse
- Date: 8 June 2002
- Winning horse: High Chaparral
- Starting price: 7/2
- Jockey: Johnny Murtagh
- Trainer: Aidan O'Brien
- Owner: Michael Tabor & Sue Magnier

Epsom Derby 2002
1-2-3
High Chaparral	Hawk Wing	Moon Ballad

Also Ran
4-5-6
Jelani	Fight Your Corner	Where Or When
7-8-9
Naheef	Bandari	Louisville
10-11-12
Tholjanah	Frankies Dream	Coshocton

The 2002 Epsom Derby was a horse race which took place at Epsom Downs on Saturday 8 June 2002. It was the 223rd running of the Derby, and it was won by High Chaparral. The winner was ridden by Johnny Murtagh and trained by Aidan O'Brien. The pre-race favourite Hawk Wing finished second.

== Race details ==
- Sponsor: Vodafone
- Winner's prize money: £800,400
- Going: Good to Soft (Soft in places)
- Number of runners: 12
- Winner's time: 2m 39.45s

== Full result ==
	*	Horse	Jockey	Trainer ^{†}	SP
1		High Chaparral	Johnny Murtagh	Aidan O'Brien (IRE)	7/2
2	2	Hawk Wing	Michael Kinane	Aidan O'Brien (IRE)	9/4 fav
3	12	Moon Ballad	Jamie Spencer	Saeed bin Suroor	20/1
4	1	Jelani	Fergal Lynch	Andrew Turnell	100/1
5	5	Fight Your Corner	Kevin Darley	Mark Johnston	8/1
6	17	Where Or When	Jimmy Fortune	Terry Mills	66/1
7	2	Naheef	Frankie Dettori	Saeed bin Suroor	5/1
8	12	Bandari	Richard Hills	Mark Johnston	9/2
9	7	Louisville	Kieren Fallon	Aidan O'Brien (IRE)	25/1
10	6	Tholjanah	Willie Supple	Marcus Tregoning	14/1
11	6	Frankies Dream	Pat Eddery	Terry Mills	100/1
Fell		Coshocton	Philip Robinson	Michael Jarvis	28/1

* The distances between the horses are shown in lengths.
† Trainers are based in Great Britain unless indicated.

== Winner's details ==
Further details of the winner, High Chaparral:

- Foaled: 1 March 1999, in Ireland
- Sire: Sadler's Wells; Dam: Kasora (Darshaan)
- Owner: Michael Tabor and Sue Magnier
- Breeder: Sean and Anne Coughlan
- Rating in 2002 International Classifications: 126

== Form analysis ==
=== Two-year-old races ===
Notable runs by the future Derby participants as two-year-olds in 2001.

- High Chaparral – 1st Racing Post Trophy
- Hawk Wing – 2nd Railway Stakes, 1st Futurity Stakes, 1st National Stakes
- Fight Your Corner – 1st Haynes, Hanson and Clark Stakes, 1st Autumn Stakes
- Where or When – 8th Vintage Stakes, 4th Solario Stakes, 1st Somerville Tattersall Stakes, 4th Dewhurst Stakes
- Naheef – 1st Vintage Stakes, 2nd National Stakes
- Bandari – 7th Solario Stakes, 1st Silver Tankard Stakes
- Tholjanah – 2nd Solario Stakes, 2nd Royal Lodge Stakes
- Coshocton – 2nd Autumn Stakes

=== The road to Epsom ===
Early-season appearances in 2002 and trial races prior to running in the Derby.

- High Chaparral – 1st Ballysax Stakes, 1st Derrinstown Stud Derby Trial
- Hawk Wing – 2nd 2,000 Guineas
- Moon Ballad – 4th UAE Derby, 2nd Newmarket Stakes, 1st Dante Stakes
- Jelani – 4th Dante Stakes
- Fight Your Corner – 7th Feilden Stakes, 1st Chester Vase
- Where or When – 11th 2,000 Guineas, 4th Dante Stakes
- Naheef – 14th 2,000 Guineas
- Bandari – 1st Lingfield Derby Trial
- Frankies Dream – 3rd Predominate Stakes
- Coshocton – 15th 2,000 Guineas, 1st Predominate Stakes

=== Subsequent Group 1 wins ===
Group 1 / Grade I victories after running in the Derby.

- High Chaparral – Irish Derby (2002), Breeders' Cup Turf (2002, 2003 dead-heat), Irish Champion Stakes (2003)
- Hawk Wing – Eclipse Stakes (2002), Lockinge Stakes (2003)
- Moon Ballad – Dubai World Cup (2003)
- Where or When – Queen Elizabeth II Stakes (2002)

== Subsequent breeding careers ==
Leading progeny of participants in the 2002 Epsom Derby.

=== Sires of Classic winners ===
High Chaparral (1st) - Shuttle stallion

- Dundeel also known as It's A Dundeel - 1st Randwick Guineas, Rosehill Guineas, Australian Derby (2013)
- Shoot Out - 1st Australian Derby (2010)
- So You Think - 1st W. S. Cox Plate (2009, 2010), Eclipse Stakes (2011), Irish Champion Stakes (2011)
- Toronado -1st Sussex Stakes (2013), 1st Queen Anne Stakes (2014)
- Altior - 1st Queen Mother Champion Chase (2018, 2019), 1st Celebration Chase (2017, 2018, 2019)

=== Sires of Group/Grade One winners ===
Hawk Wing (2nd) - Exported to South Korea in 2009

- Stand To Gain - 1st Sydney Cup (2011)
- Sydney Cup - 3rd 2000 Guineas Stakes 3rd Irish 2,000 Guineas (2008)
- Wing Stealth - Dam of Covert Love (1st Irish Oaks 2015)
- Lethal Weapon - 1st Durkan New Homes Juvenile Hurdle (2008)

=== Sires of National Hunt horses ===
Where Or When (6th)

- Melodic Rendezvous - 1st Tolworth Novices' Hurdle (2013)
- Myplacelater - 2nd Pride Stakes (2010)

=== Other Stallions ===
Bandari (8th) - Sired several jumps winners in sole crop
Jelani (4th) - Minor flat and jumps winners
Moon Ballad (3rd) - Exported to Japan - Relocated to Ireland
Frankies Dream (11th) - Exported to Saudi Arabia
