= Where or When (horse) =

Irish-bred Thoroughbred racehorse

Where Or When
- Sire: Danehill Dancer
- Grandsire: Danehill
- Dam: Future Past
- Damsire: Super Concorde
- Sex: Stallion
- Foaled: 27 January 1999
- Country: Ireland
- Colour: Chestnut
- Breeder: Ann Egan
- Owner: John Humphreys
- Trainer: Terry Mills
- Record: 18: 5-1-1
- Earnings: £357,465

Major wins
- Somerville Tattersall Stakes (2001); Thoroughbred Stakes (2002); Queen Elizabeth II Stakes (2002)

Where Or When (foaled 27 January 1999) was an Irish-bred British-trained Thoroughbred racehorse and sire. He showed good form as a two-year-old in 2001, winning three races including the Group 3 Somerville Tattersall Stakes as well as finishing fourth in the Dewhurst Stakes and the Solario Stakes. In the following year he ran unplaced in the 2000 Guineas and the Epsom Derby before recording his first win almost ten months when he took the Thoroughbred Stakes. On his final run of the year he recorded his biggest victory when he upset the odds-on favourite Hawk Wing in the Queen Elizabeth II Stakes. In 2003 he failed to win but was placed in the Lockinge Stakes and the Queen Anne Stakes. After his retirement from racing he had modest success as a breeding stallion.

== Background ==
Where Or When was a chestnut horse with white socks on his hind legs bred in Ireland by Ann Egan. As a foal in November 1999 he was consigned to the Goffs Sale and bought for IR£26,000 by Barry Reilly. As a yearling he was put up for auction at Tattersalls and was sold for 26,000 guineas to the trainer Terry Mills. He entered the ownership of the bookmaker John Humphreys and was taken into training by Mills at Epsom.

He was from the first crop of foals sired by Danehill Dancer, who won the Phoenix Stakes, National Stakes and Greenham Stakes before becoming a very successful breeding stallion. His other progeny have included Choisir, Mastercraftsman and Dancing Rain. Where Or When's dam Future Past was an Illinois-bred mare who showed modest racing ability, winning four minor race from 59 attempts for earnings of $33,961. As a broodmare she also produced the Singapore Derby winner All the Way. She was a granddaughter of the British broodmare Aimee (foaled 1957) whose other descendants included Blushing Groom, King Kamehameha and Encke.

== Racing career ==
=== 2001: two-year-old season ===
Where Or When made his racecourse debut in a minor event over seven furlongs at Ascot Racecourse on 14 July in which he started the 9/1 outsider in a five-runner field. Ridden by Richard Quinn he overcame a slow start, some difficulty obtaining a clear run in the last quarter mile and a stumble entering the final furlong to take the lead 75 yards out and won by three quarters of a length from Prince Domino. The colt was immediately stepped up in class for the Group 3 Vintage Stakes over the same distance at Goodwood Racecourse on 1 August and came home eighth of the ten runner behind Naheef. Two week later he started 2/1 second favourite for a minor race on good to firm ground at Salisbury Racecourse and won "readily" by three and a half lengths.

John Reid took the ride when Where Or When started at 6/1 for the Group 3 Solario Stakes at Sandown on 1 September in which he finished fourth behind Redback, after becoming unbalanced on the turn into the straight. In the Group 3 Somerville Tattersall Stakes over seven furlongs at Newmarket Racecourse on 5 October, the colt was reunited with Quinn and started the 6/1 third choice in the betting behind the Aidan O'Brien-trained Della Francesca and Redback. After being restrained in the early stages he made progress in the last quarter mile and despite hanging to the right he took the lead in the final furlong and held off the late challenge of Della Francesca to win by a head. Two week later Where Or When moved up to Group 1 class to contest the Dewhurst Stakes over the same course and distance. He came out the best of the British contingent, coming home fourth behind the Irish-trained colts Rock of Gibraltar, Landseer and Tendulkar.

=== 2002: three-year-old season ===
Where Or When began his second season in the 2000 Guineas over the Rowley Mile at Newmarket on 4 May in which he started at odds of 50/1 and finished unplaced behind Rock of Gibraltar. He was moved up in distance for the Dante Stakes at York in May and finished fourth behind Moon Ballad. In the 2002 Epsom Derby on 8 June he started a 66/1 outsider and came home sixth of the eleven finishers, thirty-seven lengths behind the winner High Chaparral. At Royal Ascot ten days later he ran fifth behind Rock of Gibraltar in the St James's Palace Stakes. For his next run, Where Or When was dropped back in class to contest the Listed Thoroughbred Stakes over one mile at Goodwood on 3 August in which he was ridden by Mick Kinane and started the 13/8 second favourite. After racing in third place he took the lead inside the final furlong and accelerated away to win by two and a half lengths from Flat Spin.

Three week afters win in the Thoroughbred Stakes Where Or When ran in the Celebration Mile over the same course and distance. Ridden by Kevin Darley, who partnered him in all of his subsequent races, the colt was repeatedly blocked when attempting to obtain a clear run before finishing strongly and dead-heating for fourth place behind Tillerman, beaten half a length by the winner. The Group 1 Queen Elizabeth II Stakes over one mile at Ascot on 28 September attracted only five runners and saw Hawk Wing start the 1/2 favourite ahead of the Godolphin runner Best of the Bests (Prix d'Ispahan) with Where Or When the 7/1 third choice in the betting. The other two runners were Tillerman and Sholokhov, the latter of whom had been entered in the race to act as a pacemaker for the favourite. As expected Sholokhov went off in front and opened up a clear lead from Best of the Bests and Hawk Wing with Where Or When and Tillerman held up towards the rear. Sholokhov weakened in the straight and gave way to Hawk Wing as Kevin Darley switched his mount to the left to make his challenge on the outside. Where Or When overtook Hawk Wing inside the final furlong and drew away to win by two lengths, with a further three lengths back to Tillerman in third. After the race Terry Mills, who was intending to retire at the end of the season, appeared "overwhelmed" by the occasion and said "I haven't slept for three nights and my heart is thumping. This horse is a monster, a monster. I haven't seen anything like him on the gallops at Epsom in the 15 years I've been there. I can die a happy man now." Kevin Darley commented "We went out conscious that we had one horse to beat and I've tracked him all the way round, stalked him. We got into the straight I had a lot of horse underneath me... he galloped all the way to the line".

=== 2003: four-year-old season ===
Where Or When returned as a four-year-old (still trained by Terry Mills) but failed to win in five races. On his seasonal debut he was beaten eleven lengths into second place by Hawk Wing in the Lockinge Stakes at Newbury Racecourse on 17 May, but did finish eight lengths clear of the other runners, who included Domedriver, Reel Buddy and Tillerman. He took third place behind Dubai Destination in the Queen Anne Stakes at Royal Ascot a month later and then came home fourth in the Celebration Mile at Goodwood in August. On 7 September he was sent to France for the Prix du Moulin at Longchamp Racecourse and finished sixth of the fourteen runners behind the French filly Nebraska Tornado. Where Or When's final appearance saw him attempt to repeat his 2002 success in the Queen Elizabeth II Stakes at Ascot on 27 September. After tracking the leaders he faded in the last quarter mile and came home sixth behind Falbrav.

== Stud record ==
Where Or When was retired from racing to become a breeding stallion. He sired numerous minor winners on the flat but no top-class performer. He did better as a National Hunt stallion with his progeny including Melodic Rendezvous (Tolworth Hurdle, Elite Hurdle, Champion Hurdle Trial, Kingwell Hurdle). In 2018 he was standing at the Ballycrystal Stud in County Offaly at a fee of €2,000.

== Pedigree ==
Pedigree of Where Or When (IRE), chestnut stallion, 1999
Sire Danehill Dancer (IRE) 1993	Danehill (USA); 1986	Danzig	Northern Dancer (CAN)
Sire Danehill Dancer (IRE) 1993	Danehill (USA); 1986	Danzig	Pas de Nom
Sire Danehill Dancer (IRE) 1993	Danehill (USA); 1986	Razyana	His Majesty
Sire Danehill Dancer (IRE) 1993	Danehill (USA); 1986	Razyana	Spring Adieu (CAN)
Sire Danehill Dancer (IRE) 1993	Mira Adonde (USA); 1986	Sharpen Up (GB)	Atan (USA)
Sire Danehill Dancer (IRE) 1993	Mira Adonde (USA); 1986	Sharpen Up (GB)	Rocchetta
Sire Danehill Dancer (IRE) 1993	Mira Adonde (USA); 1986	Lettre d'Amour	Caro (IRE)
Sire Danehill Dancer (IRE) 1993	Mira Adonde (USA); 1986	Lettre d'Amour	Lianga
Dam Future Past (USA) 1984	Super Concorde (USA); 1975	Bold Reasoning	Boldnesian
Dam Future Past (USA) 1984	Super Concorde (USA); 1975	Bold Reasoning	Reason to Earn
Dam Future Past (USA) 1984	Super Concorde (USA); 1975	Prime Abord (GB)	Primera
Dam Future Past (USA) 1984	Super Concorde (USA); 1975	Prime Abord (GB)	Homeward Bound
Dam Future Past (USA) 1984	Afasheen (GB); 1969	Sheshoon	Precipitation
Dam Future Past (USA) 1984	Afasheen (GB); 1969	Sheshoon	Noorani
Dam Future Past (USA) 1984	Afasheen (GB); 1969	Aimee	Tudor Minstrel
Dam Future Past (USA) 1984	Afasheen (GB); 1969	Aimee	Emali (Family 22-d)
