= Nebraska Tornado =

American-bred racehorse

- Sire: Storm Cat
- Grandsire: Storm Bird
- Dam: Media Nox
- Damsire: Lycius
- Sex: Mare
- Foaled: 19 January 2000
- Country: United States
- Colour: Dark bay or brown
- Breeder: Juddmonte Farms
- Owner: Khalid Abdullah
- Trainer: André Fabre
- Record: 10: 4-0-2
- Earnings: £370,289

Major wins
- Prix Melisande (2003); Prix de Diane (2003); Prix du Moulin (2003)

Nebraska Tornado (foaled 19 January 2000) was a Kentucky-bred, French-trained Thoroughbred racehorse and broodmare. She was unraced as a two-year-old but quickly established herself as a top-class performer in the spring of 2003, winning her first three races including the Prix Melisande and Prix de Diane. She sustained her first defeat in the Prix Jacques Le Marois but then produced her best performance to overcome a strong international field in the Prix du Moulin. She failed to win in 2004 but ran well in defeat to finish third in both the Prix d'Astarte and the Sun Chariot Stakes and fourth in the Queen Anne Stakes. After her retirement from racing she produced several winners.

== Background ==
Nebraska Tornado is a dark bay mare with a narrow white blaze and two white socks bred in Kentucky, by her owner Khalid Abdullah's Juddmonte Farms. She was sent into training with André Fabre at Chantilly in France.

She was from the twelfth crop of foals sired by Storm Cat, a high-class racehorse who won the Young America Stakes and finished second in the Breeders' Cup Juvenile in 1985. He went on to become an exceptionally successful breeding stallion, and was the Leading sire in North America in 1999 and 2000. The best of his progeny included Aljabr, Bluegrass Cat, Cat Thief, Forestry, Sophisticat, Giant's Causeway, Hold That Tiger, Jalil, Life Is Sweet, One Cool Cat, Storm Flag Flying and Tabasco Cat.

Nebraska Tornado's dam Media Nox showed high-class racing ability in a brief track career, winning the Prix du Bois in the first of her three starts, and went on to become a successful broodmare, producing several other winners including the Prix Eugène Adam winner Burning Sun. She was descended from the American broodmare Woozem (foaled 1964) who won the Demoiselle Stakes and was a half-sister to Gallant Romeo (Vosburgh Stakes).

== Racing career ==
=== 2003: three-year-old season ===
Nebraska Tornado did not race as a juvenile and began her track career in the Prix Hildegarde, a maiden race over 1600 metres on soft ground at Saint-Cloud Racecourse on 5 May. Ridden by Olivier Placais, she started the 1.4/1 favourite and won by one and a half lengths from Precious Pearl after taking the lead 200 metres from the finish. Christophe Soumillon took the ride when the filly was steppe d up in class and distance for the Listed Prix Melisande over 2000 metres at Longchamp Racecourse seventeen days later. Starting at odds of 4.5/1 in a twelve-runner field, she went to the front in the straight and won by one and a half lengths from La Sabana.

In the Group 1 Prix de Diane at Chantilly Racecourse, Nebraska Tornado was partnered by Richard Hughes and was made the 5.5/1 third choice in the betting behind Fidelite (winner of the Prix Saint-Alary) and Musical Chimes (Poule d'Essai des Pouliches). The other seven runners included Cassis (Musidora Stakes), Baie (Prix Finlande), Vallee Enchantee (Prix Isonomy), and Campsie Fells (Prix Vanteaux). After racing close behind the front-running outsider, Nebraska Tornado gained the advantage 400 metres from the finish, accelerated into a clear lead, and kept on under pressure to win by three quarters of a length from the British-trained Time Ahead.

After a break of over two months, Nebraska Tornado was dropped back in distance at Deauville Racecourse on 17 August for the 1600- Prix Jacques Le Marois, a race that saw her matched against male opposition for the first time. She was amongst the leaders from the start and went to the front 200 metres out before being outpaced in the closing stages and coming home sixth behind Six Perfections, Domedriver, Telegnosis, Special Kaldoun, and Dubai Destination. On 7 September at Longchamp, Nebraska Tornado, with Hughes in the saddle, started a 14.6/1 outsider for the Prix du Moulin over 1600 metres on good-to-soft ground. The 2002 Prix de Diane winner Bright Sky went off favourite while the other twelve runners included Domedriver, Telegnosis, Special Kaldoun, Soviet Song, Reel Buddy, Refuse To Bend, Where Or When, and Clodovil (Poule d'Essai des Poulains). In a race run in heavy rain, Nebraska Tornado settled in second behind the Japanese challenger Lohengrin before going to the front in the last 200 metres and winning by half a length. Very few of the other runners were able to get into contention, although Bright Sky and Soviet Song finished strongly to take third and fourth. After the race, André Fabre said, "I'm delighted as I know she's a top-class filly with a lot of speed – I'm not surprised or I wouldn't have run her. She's a filly who has really only just come to herself as she was growing in the summer," while Hughes commented, "That was brilliant. She's as good as Banks Hill if not better."

Although she was expected to run in the Breeders' Cup Mile, Nebraska Tornado did not race again in 2003.

In the International Classification for 2003 (the forerunner of the World's Best Racehorse Rankings), Nebraska Tornado was given a rating of 117, making her the 73rd best racehorse and the second best three-year-old filly.

=== 2004: four-year-old season ===
Nebraska Tornado began her second campaign in the Prix d'Ispahan at Longchamp on 23 May when she started second favourite but was reluctant to enter the starting stalls and finished last of the five runners behind the Italian-trained outsider Prince Kirk. She was then sent to England to contest the Queen Anne Stakes on good-to-firm ground at Royal Ascot and produced a better performance, taking the lead three furlongs from the finish and maintaining her advantage until being outpaced in the closing stages and coming home fourth behind Refuse To Bend, Soviet Song, and Salselon. In the Prix d'Astarte at Deauville on 1 August, she returned to all-female competition and started the 1.1/1 favourite in an eight-runner field. Ridden as in her last two races by Gary Stevens, she disputed the lead from the start but finished third to Marbye and Majestic Desert, beaten just over a length by the winner.

After a break of two months, Nebraska Tornado returned on 2 October to contest the Sun Chariot Stakes at Newmarket Racecourse and finished third behind Attraction and Chic, beaten less than two lengths by the winner. For her final race, she was sent to Texas for the Breeders' Cup Distaff at Lone Star Park on 30 October. Competing on dirt for the first time, she raced in second place before dropping out of contention in the straight and coming home eighth behind Ashado.

== Breeding record ==
At the end of her racing career Nebraska Tornado was retired to become a broodmare for Juddmonte. She produced at least six foals and four winners:

- Panorama Ridge, a bay filly, foaled in 2006, sired by Empire Maker. Won one race.
- Cornhusker, bay colt (later gelded), 2007, by Dynaformer. Failed to win in four races in Europe. Later won ten races in the United States where he competed in steeplechases.
- Force One, dark bay or brown filly, 2008, by Dansili. Unraced.
- Bracing Breeze, bay filly, 2010, by Dansili. Won one race.
- Rip Roaring, chestnut filly, 2011, by Sea the Stars. Won one race.
- Anadarko, bay colt, 2012, by Oasis Dream. Raced in Greece.
- Aspirer, bay filly, 2014, by Frankel. Failed to win in four races.
- Dissipate, bay filly, 2015, by Frankel. Unraced.
- Idaho Tornado, bay colt (gelded), 2016, by Candy Ride.

== Pedigree ==
Pedigree of Nebraska Tornado (USA), bay or brown mare, 2000
Sire Storm Cat (USA) 1983	Storm Bird (CAN); 1978	Northern Dancer	Nearctic
Sire Storm Cat (USA) 1983	Storm Bird (CAN); 1978	Northern Dancer	Natalma (USA)
Sire Storm Cat (USA) 1983	Storm Bird (CAN); 1978	South Ocean	New Providence
Sire Storm Cat (USA) 1983	Storm Bird (CAN); 1978	South Ocean	Shining Sun
Sire Storm Cat (USA) 1983	Terlingua (USA); 1976	Secretariat	Bold Ruler
Sire Storm Cat (USA) 1983	Terlingua (USA); 1976	Secretariat	Somethingroyal
Sire Storm Cat (USA) 1983	Terlingua (USA); 1976	Crimson Saint	Crimson Satan
Sire Storm Cat (USA) 1983	Terlingua (USA); 1976	Crimson Saint	Bolero Rose
Dam Media Nox (GB) 1993	Lycius (USA); 1988	Mr. Prospector	Raise a Native
Dam Media Nox (GB) 1993	Lycius (USA); 1988	Mr. Prospector	Gold Digger
Dam Media Nox (GB) 1993	Lycius (USA); 1988	Lypatia (FR)	Lyphard (USA)
Dam Media Nox (GB) 1993	Lycius (USA); 1988	Lypatia (FR)	Hypatia (GB)
Dam Media Nox (GB) 1993	Sky Love (USA); 1985	Nijinsky (CAN)	Northern Dancer
Dam Media Nox (GB) 1993	Sky Love (USA); 1985	Nijinsky (CAN)	Flaming Page
Dam Media Nox (GB) 1993	Sky Love (USA); 1985	Gangster of Love	Round Table
Dam Media Nox (GB) 1993	Sky Love (USA); 1985	Gangster of Love	Woozem (Family: 4-k)
