= Beauchamp King =

British-bred Thoroughbred racehorse

- Sire: Nishapour
- Grandsire: Zeddaan
- Dam: Afariya
- Damsire: Silver Shark
- Sex: Stallion
- Foaled: 17 May 1993
- Country: United Kingdom
- Colour: Grey
- Breeder: Erik Penser
- Owner: Erik Penser
- Trainer: John Dunlop; Gerard Butler
- Record: 23: 7-0-2
- Earnings: £181,256

Major wins
- Autumn Stakes (1995); Racing Post Trophy (1995); Craven Stakes (1996); Spring Trophy (1998)

Beauchamp King (17 May 1993 – after 2007) was a British Thoroughbred racehorse and sire. After finishing third on his racecourse debut he won his remaining four races as a two-year-old in 1995, including victories in the Autumn Stakes and the Racing Post Trophy to establish himself as one of the best staying juveniles of his generation in Britain. He upset Alhaarth in the Craven Stakes on his three-year-old debut and went on to finish fifth in the 2000 Guineas and third in the Irish 2,000 Guineas. He won one minor race in 1997 and the Spring Trophy in 1998 before being retired from racing at the end of the 1999 season. He made no impact as a sire of winners.

== Background ==
Beauchamp King was a grey horse bred in England by his owner Erik Penser a Swedish financier based at Compton Beauchamp in the Vale of the White Horse. He was sired by Nishapour, a French stallion whose biggest win came in the 1978 Poule d'Essai des Poulains. As a breeding stallion, the best of his other progeny included the Prix de Diane winner Shemaka and the leading National Hunt performers Calapaez (Cleeve Hurdle) and First Bout (Triumph Hurdle). Beauchamp King's dam Afariya was bred by the Aga Khan and won two minor races in France. She was a descendant of the French broodmare Minnewaska, who was the ancestor of many major winners including Tom Rolfe, Sham and Ack Ack.

Penser sent his colt into training with John Dunlop at his stable in Arundel, West Sussex. Beauchamp King's successes in 1995 helped Dunlop win his first and only trainers' championship.

== Racing career ==
=== 1995: two-year-old season ===
Beauchamp King began his racing career by finishing third of the eight runners in a maiden race over seven furlongs at Kempton Park Racecourse on 28 June. On 8 August at Ayr Racecourse he started 8/13 for a similar event and recorded his first success, accelerating away from his four opponents in the closing stages to win by four lengths. On his next appearance the colt started 7/2 second favourite for a minor stakes race at Haydock Park on 2 September and won by three and a half lengths from Matiya, a filly who went on to finish third in the Fillies' Mile. He was then stepped up in class and distance for the Listed Autumn Stakes over one mile at Ascot Racecourse on 7 October and started third choice in the betting behind Storm Trooper and Ramooz. Ridden for the first time by John Reid he was restrained in the early stages before taking the lead a furlong and a half from the finish and winning by one and a quarter lengths from Storm Trooper.

Reid was again in the saddle two weeks later when Beauchamp King was stepped up to Group One level for the Racing Post Trophy at Doncaster Racecourse and started the 11/4 second favourite behind the Luca Cumani-trained Mons, a five length winner of the Royal Lodge Stakes. The other two runners were the Somerville Tattersall Stakes winner Even Top, and the Peter Walwyn-trained outsider Iamus. Penser had to pay a supplementary fee of £15,000 as the colt had not been among the original entries for the race. Reid settled the colt in third place as Mons set the pace from Even Top. Beauchamp King moved forward from half way, took the lead approaching the final furlong and won "readily" by one and a quarter lengths from Even Top and Mons. After the race Reid commented; "Perhaps I should have waited a bit longer, but he was always going well and from three down I knew he would win... He travels well in his races, and has a real turn of foot. And he goes on any ground. They're the signs of a good horse".

=== 1996: three-year-old season ===
On his first appearance as a three-year-old Beauchamp King contested the Craven Stakes (a major trial race for the 2000 Guineas) over the Rowley Mile at Newmarket Racecourse on 18 April. He started the 9/2 second favourite behind Alhaarth (the Cartier Champion Two-year-old Colt of 1995), whilst the other three runners included Polaris Flight, the winner of the Richmond Stakes and the Critérium de Saint-Cloud. After being held up by Reid at the rear of the field he overtook Alhaarth inside the final furlong and won by a neck, with Polaris Flight three and a half lengths back in third. Robin Oakley, writing in The Spectator, described the winner as "a gutsy horse who seems to go on improving with every run".

After winning five consecutive races, Beauchamp King started 9/2 second favourite behind Alhaarth in the 2000 Guineas on 4 May. He pulled hard against Reid's attempts to restrain him and was never able to reach the leaders before finishing fifth behind Mark of Esteem, Even Top, Bijou d'Inde and Alhaarth. In the Irish 2,000 Guineas three weeks later at the Curragh he stayed on well in the closing stages to finish third behind Spinning World and Rainbow Blues.

In his two remaining races of 1996 Beauchamp King was matched against older horses but failed to reproduce his best form. He finished last of seven in both the Eclipse Stakes over ten furlongs at Sandown Park Racecourse on 6 July and the Celebration Mile at Goodwood Racecourse on 24 August.

=== 1997 – 1999: later career ===
As a four-year old Beauchamp King finished unplaced in the Sandown Mile, the Lockinge Stakes and the Queen Anne Stakes before winning a minor race over a mile at Doncaster on 31 July. On his only other start of the year he finished last of eight in the Desmond Stakes.

In 1998 Beauchamp King was transferred to the stable of Dunlop's former assistant Gerard Butler. On his first appearance for his new trainer, the horse started a 16/1 outsider for the Listed Spring Trophy over seven furlongs at Haydock on 2 May. Ridden by Chris Rutter, he overcame an obstructed run in the straight to take the lead in the final strides and won by a neck from Ramooz. He failed to build on his success and finished unplaced in his four subsequent races that year.

Beauchamp King remained in training as a six-year-old but made no impact in two races, finishing last in the Lincoln Handicap and ninth in the Spring Trophy.

== Stud record ==
At the end of his racing career, Beauchamp King was retired to become a breeding stallion. He stood in France, Italy and Ireland but had very little success as a sire of winners. His last foals were born in 2008.

== Pedigree ==
Pedigree of Beauchamp King (GB), grey stallion, 1993
Sire Nishapour (FR) 1975	Zeddaan (GB); 1965	Grey Sovereign	Nasrullah
Sire Nishapour (FR) 1975	Zeddaan (GB); 1965	Grey Sovereign	Kong
Sire Nishapour (FR) 1975	Zeddaan (GB); 1965	Vareta	Vilmorin
Sire Nishapour (FR) 1975	Zeddaan (GB); 1965	Vareta	Veronique
Sire Nishapour (FR) 1975	Alama (IRE); 1969	Aureole	Hyperion
Sire Nishapour (FR) 1975	Alama (IRE); 1969	Aureole	Angelola
Sire Nishapour (FR) 1975	Alama (IRE); 1969	Nucciolina	Nuccio
Sire Nishapour (FR) 1975	Alama (IRE); 1969	Nucciolina	Mah Behar
Dam Afariya (FR) 1973	Silver Shark (GB); 1963	Buisson Ardent	Relic
Dam Afariya (FR) 1973	Silver Shark (GB); 1963	Buisson Ardent	Rose O'Lynn
Dam Afariya (FR) 1973	Silver Shark (GB); 1963	Palsaka	Palestine
Dam Afariya (FR) 1973	Silver Shark (GB); 1963	Palsaka	Masaka
Dam Afariya (FR) 1973	Lady Millie (USA); 1965	Reneged	Revoked
Dam Afariya (FR) 1973	Lady Millie (USA); 1965	Reneged	White Samite
Dam Afariya (FR) 1973	Lady Millie (USA); 1965	Milania	Polynesian
Dam Afariya (FR) 1973	Lady Millie (USA); 1965	Milania	Miliana (Family: 9-h)
