= Reel Buddy =

American-bred Thoroughbred racehorse

- Sire: Mr Greeley
- Grandsire: Gone West
- Dam: Rosebud
- Damsire: Indian Ridge
- Sex: Stallion
- Foaled: 8 February 1998
- Country: United States
- Colour: Chestnut
- Breeder: Stronach Stables
- Owner: Speedlith Group
- Trainer: Richard Hannon, Sr
- Record: 34: 9-4-5
- Earnings: £426,878

Major wins
- Abernant Stakes (2002); Spring Trophy (2002); Hungerford Stakes (2002); Sussex Stakes (2003)

Reel Buddy (foaled 8 February 1998) was an American-bred, British-trained Thoroughbred racehorse and sire best known for his upset win in the 2003 Sussex Stakes. He was foaled in Kentucky, and was sold to race in England after initially failing to attract interest from American buyers. In his first two seasons he won four relatively minor races from eighteen starts, showing himself to be a good and consistent racehorse but some way below top class. As a four-year-old in 2002 he showed improved form, winning the Abernant Stakes, Spring Trophy and Hungerford Stakes. In the following year he was beaten in his first five races before producing a career-best performance on his thirty-third start to win the Sussex Stakes at odds of 20/1. He was retired to stud at the end of the year and was later exported to Greece. He has made little impact as a breeding stallion.

== Background ==
Reel Buddy was a chestnut horse with a broad white blaze and white socks on his hind legs bred in Kentucky by Stronach Stables. He was sired by Mr Greeley, whose five wins included the Swale Stakes and the Lafayette Stakes and who also finished second in the Breeders' Cup Sprint. As a breeding stallion, Mr Greeley is best known as the sire of the outstanding Irish-trained filly Finsceal Beo. Reel Buddy's dam Rosebud won one minor race at Pontefract from seven starts in 1994 and 1995. Rosebud was a granddaughter of Gala Tess, a half-sister of the Irish 2,000 Guineas winner Furry Glen.

In November 1998 at Keeneland the weanling colt was offered for sale but failed to reach his reserve price of $19,000. He returned to the Keeneland sales in January 1999 and was sold for $16,000 to the S Thoroughbred Syndicate. As a yearling Reel Buddy was offered for sale at Doncaster in September 1999 and was bought for 23,000 guineas by Peter Doyle Bloodstock. The colt entered the ownership of the Speedlith Group and was sent into training with Richard Hannon at East Everleigh in Wiltshire.

== Racing career ==
=== 2000: two-year-old season ===
Reel Buddy managed one second place (in a six furlong maiden race at Goodwood) in his first six races. On his seventh appearance he started 6/4 favorite for a maiden race over five furlongs at Bath Racecourse on 20 August and won by three lengths from nine opponents. He followed up at Ripon nine days later, taking the lead a furlong out and beating Proud Boast by three quarters of a length. He then finished second in a valuable sales race at Doncaster and ended the year by finishing unplaced in the Group Three Cornwallis Stakes at Ascot Racecourse in October.

=== 2001: three-year-old season ===
Reel Buddy began his second season by finishing third behind Clearing in the Free Handicap at Newmarket Racecourse on 18 April. The colt then won a handicap race at Newmarket on 4 May and a more valuable handicap at Goodwood later that month. Reel Buddy did not win again in 2001 but ran well in several important races. In June he finished third in the King Charles II Stakes, eighth in the Jersey Stakes and second in the Criterion Stakes. Later in the year he finished fifth in the Lennox Stakes, sixth in the Hungerford Stakes and sixth in the Dubai Duty Free Cup.

=== 2002: four-year-old season ===
At the start of the 2002 season, Reel Buddy showed improved form to win his first three races. On his debut he won the Quail Stakes at kempton Park on 1 April, defeating the Ayr Gold Cup winner Continent by a short head. In the Listed Abernant Stakes over six furlongs at Newmarket two weeks later he was ridden by Jimmy Fortune and started third favourite behind Continent and Invincible Spirit. He recorded his first important victory as he finished strongly to beat Continent by a neck with Needwood Blade taking third ahead of Invincible Spirit. In the Listed Spring Trophy at Haydock Park on 4 May he started 11/8 favourite in a seven-runner field and won again, beating Patsy's Double by one and a half lengths. He was stepped up to Group Three class for the Duke of York Stakes later that month and finished sixth behind Invincible Spirit.

Reel Buddy made his first appearance in a Group One race when he contested the July Cup over six furlongs at Newmarket on 11 July and finished tenth of the fourteen runners behind Continent. At the end of the month he ran for the first time over one mile and started a 33/1 outsider for the Sussex Stakes at Goodwood. Ridden by Richard Hughes he took the lead in the straight and maintained his advantage until the final furlong when he was overtaken and finished third behind Rock of Gibraltar and Noverre. On 17 August, Reel Buddy, racing for the twenty-fifth time, started 7/2 second favourite for the Group Three Hungerford Stakes over seven furlongs at Newbury. Ridden by Richard Quinn, he started slowly but began to make progress approaching the last quarter mile. After looking unlikely to obtain clear run he took the lead inside the final furlong and held off the late challenge of his stable companion Umistim to win by a short head and record his first Group race success. After the race, Hannon commented that he had thought that Reel Buddy would need "tin-opener" to get through the "wall of horses" in front of him in the straight and said "He dwelt and then I thought he was never going to get out of there, but in the end he got there too soon". Quinn, however, said "The only time I was worried was taking him down [to the start] as he was a bit keen!" According to the Sunday Mirror, the trainer had mixed feelings about the result: he described the winner as "a grand servant" who "deserved to win a big race" before adding "I hope I haven't upset Umistim's owner too much. I'm off to buy her a drink".

A week later he finished third in the Celebration Mile, beaten a neck and a short head by Tillerman and Redback. On his final appearance of the season, he ran poorly in the Challenge Stakes at Newmarket in October, finishing sixteenth of the eighteen runners behind Nayyir.

=== 2003: five-year-old season ===
Reel Buddy began his fourth season with two unimpressive at Doncaster Racecourse, finishing last of eight in the Doncaster Mile and eleventhe in the Cammidge Trophy two days later. He showed improved form in the Sandown Mile in April, finishing third behind Desert Deer and Smirk. In the Group One Lockinge Stakes at Newbury in May he started a 50/1 outsider and finished fifth of the six runners behind Hawk Wing. In the Diomed Stakes at Epsom Downs Racecourse in June he started poorly and trailed the field in last place before finishing strongly to take second place, a length and a quarter behind the six-year-old Gateman.

On 30 July, ridden by the 51-year-old Pat Eddery, Reel Buddy made his second attempt to win the Sussex Stakes and started a 20/1 outsider in a nine-runner field. The Roger Charlton-trained Trade Fair, winner of the Criterion Stakes, started favourite ahead of Moon Ballad, Zafeen, the Coventry Stakes winner Statue of Liberty and Norse Dancer (third in the 2000 Guineas). The prevailing soft ground had led to the withdrawal of the pre-race favourite Kalaman and the Queen Elizabeth II Stakes winner Where Or When. The pacemakers Blatant and Spartacus led the field in the early stages with Reel Buddy settled in last place by Eddery. After turning into the straight, the runners moved towards the centre of the course and Zafeen, Trade Fair all made progress to dispute the lead approaching the final furlong. Reel Buddy, having been still last of the nine runners entering the last quarter mile, was switched to the right and began to make rapid progress on the inside (Goodwood is a right-handed track). He took the lead 75 yards from the finish and prevailed in a five-horse blanket finish, beating Statue of Liberty and Norse Dancer by a head and a short head, with Zafeen a neck away in fourth, just in front of Moon Ballad. He became the longest-priced winner of the race since 1963 when Queen's Hussar won at 25/1. Eddery had announced that he would retire at the end of the season, and as he returned to the winner's circle on Reel Buddy, he was given a standing ovation by his fellow jockeys. Eddery commented "It feels really good. He ran a blinder at Epsom when the ground was a bit firm for him and he came home a little bit sore but Richard got him back here today and everything went nice. They went flat out and I settled him out the back and I brought him through them. I just had to squeeze him because if you give him a slap he pulls up with you". Richard Hannon Jr. the son of (and assistant to) Reel Buddy's trainer said of the horse "He's never won anything better than a Group Three before, but he's always been the sort who might do something like this. He's picked his day big time."

On his final appearance, Reel Buddy was sent to France for the Prix du Moulin at Longchamp Racecourse. After being held up by Eddery at the rear of the field, he made progress into sixth place in the straight but tired in the closing stages and finished last of the fourteen runners behind Nebraska Tornado.

== Stud record ==
Reel Buddy was retired from racing at the end of his five-year-old season to become a breeding stallion. He was based at the Bearstone Stud in Shropshire until December 2008 when he was sold and exported to Greece to stand at the private stud of the shipping magnate John Chandris.

== Pedigree ==
Pedigree of Reel Buddy (USA), chestnut horse, 1998
Sire Mr Greeley (USA) 1992	Gone West (USA); 1984	Mr. Prospector	Raise a Native
Sire Mr Greeley (USA) 1992	Gone West (USA); 1984	Mr. Prospector	Gold Digger
Sire Mr Greeley (USA) 1992	Gone West (USA); 1984	Secrettame	Secretariat
Sire Mr Greeley (USA) 1992	Gone West (USA); 1984	Secrettame	Tamerett
Sire Mr Greeley (USA) 1992	Long Legend (USA); 1978	Reviewer	Bold Ruler
Sire Mr Greeley (USA) 1992	Long Legend (USA); 1978	Reviewer	Broadway
Sire Mr Greeley (USA) 1992	Long Legend (USA); 1978	Lianga	Dancer's Image
Sire Mr Greeley (USA) 1992	Long Legend (USA); 1978	Lianga	Leven Ones
Dam Rosebud (GB) 1992	Indian Ridge (IRE); 1985	Ahonoora	Lorenzaccio
Dam Rosebud (GB) 1992	Indian Ridge (IRE); 1985	Ahonoora	Helen Nichols
Dam Rosebud (GB) 1992	Indian Ridge (IRE); 1985	Hillbrow	Swing Easy
Dam Rosebud (GB) 1992	Indian Ridge (IRE); 1985	Hillbrow	Golden City
Dam Rosebud (GB) 1992	Tiszta Sharok (IRE); 1984	Song	Sing Sing
Dam Rosebud (GB) 1992	Tiszta Sharok (IRE); 1984	Song	Intent
Dam Rosebud (GB) 1992	Tiszta Sharok (IRE); 1984	Tin Tessa	Martinmas
Dam Rosebud (GB) 1992	Tiszta Sharok (IRE); 1984	Tin Tessa	Gala Tess (Family: 8-d)
