= Thoroughbred Stakes =

Flat horse race in Britain

- Class: Group 3
- Location: Goodwood Racecourse; W. Sussex, England
- Race type: Flat / Thoroughbred
- Sponsor: Bonhams
- Website: Goodwood

Race information
- Distance: 1 mile (1,609 metres)
- Surface: Turf
- Track: Right-handed
- Qualification: Three-year-olds excluding G1 winners
- Weight: 9 st 3 lb Allowances; 3 lb for fillies Penalties; 7 lb for Group 2 winners * 4 lb for Group 3 winners * * after 2024
- Purse: £100,000 (2025); 1st: £56,710

Thoroughbred Stakes
2026
| Shayem | Talk of New York | Catullus |

Previous years
2025
Seagulls Eleven | Diego Ventura | King Of Cities
2024
Lead Artist | King's Gamble | Task Force
2023
Epictetus | Nostrum | Galeron
2022
Rocchigiani | The Wizard Of Eye | Sonny Liston
2021
Baaeed | El Drama | Tasman Bay

2020-2011
2020
Tilsit | My Oberon | Khaloosy
2019
Duke Of Hazzard | Turjomaan | Momkin
2018
Regal Reality | Ostilio | Chief Ironside
2017
Beat The Bank | Make Time | Forest Ranger
2016
Thikriyaat | Forge | Light Up Our World
2015
Malabar | Kool Kompany | Latharnach
2014
Wannabe Yours | Hors De Combat | Bow Creek
2013
Montiridge | Tawhid | Snowboarder
2012
Trumpet Major | Archbishop | Aljamaaheer
2011
Neebras | Chef | Western Aristocrat

2010-2001
2010
Critical Moment | Desert Myth | Field Of Dream
2009
Zacinto | Hartley | Pure Poetry
2008
River Proud | Alexandros | Atlantic Sport
2007
Dubai's Touch | Traffic Guard | Tobosa
2006
Prince of Light | Metropolitan Man | City of Troy
2005
Forward Move | Oude | Museeb
2004
Fong's Thong | Mandobi | Kings Point
2003
Court Masterpiece | Hurricane Alan | Excelsius
2002
Where Or When | Flat Spin | L'Oiseau D'Argent
2001
Goggles | Sonatina | Rosi's Boy

2000-1991
2000
Adilabad | Summoner | Trillion Delight
1999
Slip Stream | Bahamian Bandit | Raise A Grand
1998
Great Dane | Equity Princess | Soviet Bureau
1997
Cape Cross | Dragonada | Kenmist
1996
Hammerstein | Russian Music | Kammtarra
1995
Tamayaz | First Island | Be Mindful
1994
Wijdan | Green Green Desert | Electrify
1993
Gabr | Visto Si Stampi | Imaginary
1992
River Falls | John Rose | L'Hermine
1991
Flashfoot | Dawson Place | Stone Mill

1990-1988
1990
Thakib | Raj Waki | Halston Prince
1989
Sabotage | Northern Habit | Only two ran
1988
Literati | Hibernian Gold | Halcyon Days

The Thoroughbred Stakes is a Group 3 flat horse race in Great Britain open to three-year-old horses. It is run at Goodwood over a distance of 1 mile (1,609 metres), and it is scheduled to take place each year in late July or early August.

== History ==
The event was formerly ungraded, and it used to be called the Surplice Stakes. It was sponsored by Vodafone from 1993, and for several years it was known by a sponsored title. It was given Listed status and renamed the Thoroughbred Stakes in 1998.

The race was backed by Blue Square from 2007 to 2010, and by RSA in 2011 and 2012. Since 2013 it has been sponsored by Bonhams. It was promoted to Group 3 level in 2012.

The Thoroughbred Stakes is currently held on the fourth day of the five-day Glorious Goodwood meeting.

== Records ==
Leading jockey (7 wins):

- Frankie Dettori – Tamayaz (1995), Cape Cross (1997), Slip Stream (1999), Neebras (2011), Archbishop (2012), Regal Reality (2018), Epictetus (2023)

Leading trainer (6 wins):

- Sir Michael Stoute – Sabotage (1989), Hammerstein (1996), Adilabad (2000), Zacinto (2009), Thikriyaat (2016), Regal Reality (2018)

== Winners ==
| Year | Winner | Jockey | Trainer | Time |
|---|---|---|---|---|
| 1970 | Biskrah | Eddie Hide | Sir Gordon Richards | 2:11.20 |
| 1971 | Royal Park | Geoff Lewis | Bruce Hobbs | 2:10.29 |
| 1972 | Red Power | Lester Piggott | John Sutcliffe | 2:11.69 |
| 1973 | Knight Templar | Tony Murray | Ryan Price | 2:10.14 |
| 1974 | Peter Prompt | Lester Piggott | Henry Cecil | 2:09.00 |
| 1975 | Ranksborough | Philip Waldron | Henry Candy | 2:10.02 |
| 1976 | Quite Candid | Brian Taylor | Ryan Price | 2:09.72 |
| 1977 | Reformatory | Ron Hutchinson | John Dunlop | 1:39.59 |
| 1978 | Smackover | Pat Eddery | Ian Walker | 1:40.87 |
| 1979 | Tahitian King | Joe Mercer | Henry Cecil | 1:42.76 |
| 1980 | Astonished | Lester Piggott | John Dunlop | 1:40.92 |
| 1981 | Indian King | Greville Starkey | Guy Harwood | 1:42.95 |
| 1982 | Mennea | Lester Piggott | Ryan Price | 1:43.06 |
| 1983 | Page Blanche | Joe Mercer | Paul Kelleway | 1:41.28 |
| 1984 | Fandango Beat | Steve Cauthen | Barry Hills | 1:45.87 |
| 1985 | Bentom | Greville Starkey | Guy Harwood | 1:48.34 |
| 1986 | Bronze Opal | Robert Weaver | Toby Balding | 1:41.37 |
| 1987 | Imperial Frontier | Ray Cochrane | Luca Cumani | 1:39.26 |
| 1988 | Literati | Michael Hills | Barry Hills | 1:43.76 |
| 1989 | Sabotage | Walter Swinburn | Michael Stoute | 1:41.21 |
| 1990 | Thakib | Willie Carson | John Gosden | 1:38.68 |
| 1991 | Flashfoot | Pat Eddery | Ian Balding | 1:41.02 |
| 1992 | River Falls | John Reid | Richard Hannon Sr. | 1:40.88 |
| 1993 | Gabr | Willie Carson | Robert Armstrong | 1:41.76 |
| 1994 | Wijdan | Willie Carson | Dick Hern | 1:36.67 |
| 1995 | Tamayaz | Frankie Dettori | Saeed bin Suroor | 1:38.58 |
| 1996 | Hammerstein | Pat Eddery | Michael Stoute | 1:36.89 |
| 1997 | Cape Cross | Frankie Dettori | John Gosden | 1:37.01 |
| 1998 | Great Dane | Kieren Fallon | Henry Cecil | 1:37.72 |
| 1999 | Slip Stream | Frankie Dettori | Saeed bin Suroor | 1:38.53 |
| 2000 | Adilabad | Pat Eddery | Sir Michael Stoute | 1:38.72 |
| 2001 | Goggles | Chris Rutter | Henry Candy | 1:39.87 |
| 2002 | Where Or When | Michael Kinane | Terry Mills | 1:37.05 |
| 2003 | Court Masterpiece | Johnny Murtagh | Ed Dunlop | 1:38.38 |
| 2004 | Fong's Thong | Jimmy Fortune | Brian Meehan | 1:37.81 |
| 2005 | Forward Move | Ryan Moore | Richard Hannon Sr. | 1:40.70 |
| 2006 | Prince of Light | Joe Fanning | Mark Johnston | 1:38.27 |
| 2007 | Dubai's Touch | Royston Ffrench | Mark Johnston | 1:37.20 |
| 2008 | River Proud | Richard Hughes | Paul Cole | 1:38.29 |
| 2009 | Zacinto | Ryan Moore | Sir Michael Stoute | 1:41.30 |
| 2010 | Critical Moment | Michael Hills | Barry Hills | 1:38.16 |
| 2011 | Neebras | Frankie Dettori | Mahmood Al Zarooni | 1:38.08 |
| 2012 (dh) | Archbishop; Trumpet Major | Frankie Dettori; Richard Hughes | Brian Meehan; Richard Hannon Sr. | 1:37.53 |
| 2013 | Montiridge | Richard Hughes | Richard Hannon Sr. | 1:37.37 |
| 2014 | Wannabe Yours | William Buick | John Gosden | 1:36.10 |
| 2015 | Malabar | Silvestre de Sousa | Mick Channon | 1:36.82 |
| 2016 | Thikriyaat | Paul Hanagan | Sir Michael Stoute | 1:38.16 |
| 2017 | Beat The Bank | Ryan Moore | Andrew Balding | 1:40.83 |
| 2018 | Regal Reality | Frankie Dettori | Sir Michael Stoute | 1:36.79 |
| 2019 | Duke of Hazzard | P. J. McDonald | Paul Cole | 1:35.70 |
| 2020 | Tilsit | Ryan Moore | Charlie Hills | 1:40.46 |
| 2021 | Baaeed | Jim Crowley | William Haggas | 1:41.20 |
| 2022 | Rocchigiani (Note: The 2022 winner Rocchigiani was later exported to Hong Kong and renamed Flaming Rabbit) | Tom Marquand | Peter Schiergen | 1:38.10 |
| 2023 | Epictetus | Frankie Dettori | John & Thady Gosden | 1:41.04 |
| 2024 | Lead Artist | Kieran Shoemark | John & Thady Gosden | 1:35.82 |
| 2025 | Seagulls Eleven | Oisin Murphy | Hugo Palmer | 1:39.65 |
| 2026 | Shayem (Note: The 2026 winner Shayem was later exported to Hong Kong) | Clifford Lee | Karl Burke | 1:35.05 |

== See also ==
- Horse racing in Great Britain
- List of British flat horse races
