= Hawk Wing =

American-bred Thoroughbred racehorse and sire (1999–2025)

- Racing silks of Susan Magnier
- Sire: Woodman
- Grandsire: Mr. Prospector
- Dam: La Lorgnette
- Damsire: Val de l'Orne
- Sex: Stallion
- Foaled: 19 May 1999
- Died: 1 December 2025 (aged 26)
- Country: United States
- Colour: Bay
- Breeder: Hill 'n' Dale Farms
- Owner: Sue Magnier
- Trainer: Aidan O'Brien
- Record: 12: 5-5-0
- Earnings: £1,060,491

Major wins
- Futurity Stakes (2001); National Stakes (2001); Eclipse Stakes (2002); Lockinge Stakes (2003)

Awards
- First in World Thoroughbred Rankings (2003); Timeform rating: 136
- Last updated on 12 October 2024

Hawk Wing (19 May 1999 – 1 December 2025) was an American-bred, Irish-trained Thoroughbred racehorse and sire. Owned by the Magnier family and trained by Aidan O'Brien, the horse won three Group One races and was the leading horse in the world in 2003. As a stallion he had some success.

== 2001: Two-year-old career ==
Hawk Wing was the top two-year-old of 2001 in the United Kingdom and Ireland, by virtue of a two and a half length win in the National Stakes. He was not undefeated at two, however, having earlier finished second in the Railway Stakes behind Rock Of Gibraltar. Hawk Wing's subsequent victories in the National Stakes (in an all-age course record time) and the Futurity Stakes led him to the position of favorite for the following year's 2,000 Guineas and Epsom Derby.

== 2002: Three-year-old career ==
In the 2,000 Guineas, two distinct groups formed on either side of the straight track, with the faster ground on the far side. Hawk Wing was in the group on the stands side, while the group on the far side, containing Rock Of Gibraltar, was travelling slightly further ahead. Hawk Wing beat his own group and was rapidly closing in on Rock Of Gibraltar but lost by a neck.

His next run was in the 2002 Epsom Derby, where his run in the Guineas was enough to give him the position of market favorite again. He ran second to stablemate High Chaparral. The pair were twelve lengths clear of a field including the winners of three major Derby trials. After the Derby, he subsequently dropped back to 10 furlongs and won the prestigious Eclipse Stakes at Sandown Park. He was beaten a short head by Grandera in a renewal of the Irish Champion Stakes at Leopardstown, further prompting some in believing that he was not the most genuine of race horses. A runner-up finish behind Where Or When despite being the heavy favourite in the Queen Elizabeth II Stakes at Ascot and a disappointing Stateside trip to the Breeders' Cup Classic further dented his reputation.

== 2003: Four-year-old career ==
Hawk Wing was kept in training at the age of four years. A field of six ran in the 2003 Group One Lockinge Stakes at Newbury, including: Where Or When, who had beaten Hawk Wing in the Queen Elizabeth II Stakes; Olden Times, winner of the Group One Prix Jean Prat; Domedriver, who had inflicted Rock Of Gibraltar's first defeat in eight Group One races in the Breeders' Cup Mile; Reel Buddy (priced at 50-1 despite having been placed in the Group One Sussex Stakes - an indication of the quality of the field); and Celebration Mile winner Tillerman. Hawk Wing beat this Group One field by 11 lengths, with second place Where Or When eight lengths clear of Olden Times in third. Timeform rated him at 136, suggesting that this was the best performance in the world over a mile for nearly ten years.

On his only subsequent outing in the Queen Anne Stakes at Royal Ascot Hawk Wing finished unplaced after suffering a knee ligament injury which ended his racing career.

== Stud career ==
Hawk Wing retired to Coolmore stud in Ireland. His first crop were juveniles in 2007 and included 11 winners as of 18 August. In Australia, his Irish-bred sons Hawk Island (Wyong Cup, Parramatta Cup and JRA Plate) and Stand To Gain (Sydney Cup) have won stakes races.

After standing for a fee of €15,000 in 2008, Hawk Wing was sold to stand in Korea in a deal arranged by BBA Ireland Ltd. He covered an average of 80 mares a season in his first four years in Korea but demand for his services declined and he is recorded as covering only five mares since 2016.

== Pedigree ==
Pedigree of Hawk Wing
Sire Woodman	Mr. Prospector	Raise a Native	Native Dancer
Sire Woodman	Mr. Prospector	Raise a Native	Raise You
Sire Woodman	Mr. Prospector	Gold Digger	Nashua
Sire Woodman	Mr. Prospector	Gold Digger	Sequence
Sire Woodman	Playmate	Buckpasser	Tom Fool
Sire Woodman	Playmate	Buckpasser	Busanda
Sire Woodman	Playmate	Intriguing	Swaps
Sire Woodman	Playmate	Intriguing	Glamour
Dam La Lorgnette	Val de l'Orne	Val de Loir	Vieux Manoir
Dam La Lorgnette	Val de l'Orne	Val de Loir	Vali
Dam La Lorgnette	Val de l'Orne	Aglae	Armistice
Dam La Lorgnette	Val de l'Orne	Aglae	Aglae Grace
Dam La Lorgnette	The Temptress	Nijinsky	Northern Dancer
Dam La Lorgnette	The Temptress	Nijinsky	Flaming Page
Dam La Lorgnette	The Temptress	La Sevillana	Court Harwell
Dam La Lorgnette	The Temptress	La Sevillana	Giraldilla

== Death ==
Hawk Wing's death was announced on 2 December 2025. He died of colic in South Korea, at the age of 26.

== Sources ==
- 2002 2000 Guineas on Youtube
- 2003 Lockinge Stakes on Youtube
