= Ebro River (horse) =

Irish-bred Thoroughbred racehorse

- Racing silks of Al Shaqab Racing
- Sire: Galileo Gold
- Grandsire: Paco Boy
- Dam: Soft Power
- Damsire: Balmont
- Sex: Colt
- Foaled: 25 January 2019
- Country: Ireland
- Colour: Chestnut
- Breeder: Tally-Ho Stud
- Owner: Al Shaqab Racing
- Trainer: Hugo Palmer
- Record: 9: 3-0-1
- Earnings: £186,855

Major wins
- National Stakes (2021); Phoenix Stakes (2021); Queensferry Stakes (2022)

Ebro River (foaled 25 January 2019) is an Irish-bred, British-trained Thoroughbred racehorse. He was one of the most successful juveniles in Europe in the summer of 2021 when he won three races including the National Stakes in England and the Phoenix Stakes in Ireland.

== Background ==
Ebro River is a chestnut horse with a white star bred in Ireland by the County Westmeath-based Tally-Ho Stud, a breeding operation run by the O'Callaghan family. In October 2020 the yearling was consigned to the Tattersalls sale and was bought for 75,000 guineas by the bloodstock agent Charles Gordon Watson on behalf of Joaan bin Hamad bin Khalifa Al Thani's Al Shaqab Racing. The colt was sent into training with Hugo Palmer at Kremlin Cottage Stables in Newmarket, Suffolk.

He was from the first crop of foals sired by Galileo Gold who won the 2000 Guineas and St James's Palace Stakes in 2016. Ebro River's dam Soft Power showed modest racing ability, winning one minor race from six starts but was a half-sister to the dam of Slade Power. She was a distant female-line descendant of Montem, a British broodmare who was the ancestor of Sweet Solera, Aunt Edith, Ellangowan and Blind Luck.

== Racing career ==
=== 2021: two-year-old season ===
In 2021 Ebro River was ridden in most of his races by James Doyle. The colt made his track debut on 13 April in a novice race (for horses with no more than two previous wins) over five furlongs at Newmarket Racecourse in which he started at odds of 11/1 and finished sixth after becoming upset in the starting stalls and then struggling to obtain a clear run in the closing stages. On 15 May at Doncaster Racecourse he started 13/8 second favourite for a novice race over the same distance on soft ground when he was ridden by David Egan and recorded his first victory as he recovered from a poor start to take the lead two furlongs out and won by a length from Kyber Crystal with the pair finishing six lengths clear of the other six runners. Twelve days after his success at Doncaster Ebro River was stepped up in class for the Listed National Stakes at Sandown Park and started the 4/1 third choice in the betting behind Navello and Chipotle in a seven-runner field. With Doyle in the saddle, he took the lead approaching the final furlong and despite hanging to the left in the closing stages he drew clear of his opponents to win by three and a quarter lengths. Hugo Palmer, who was unable to be present at the course after being sy=tuck in traffic said: "He's looked very smart from the first day he came in. He's obviously still a bit babyish and has a few crinkles to iron out – how we do that, I'm not sure. He'll be fine on any ground and it isn't a surprise he's so precocious... This horse will get a mile in time, but we'll gradually step him up as the season progresses. He's got some growing up to do."

At Royal Ascot on 15 June Ebro River was moved in class and distance for the Group 2 Coventry Stakes over six furlongs when he took the lead approaching the final furlong but was overtaken in the closing stages and finished fifth behind Berkshire Shadow, beaten two and a quarter lengths by the winner. He next appeared Newmarket 23 days later when he came home fourth behind Lusail, Asymmetric and Sam Maximus in the July Stakes. In the Richmond Stakes at Goodwood Racecourse on 29 July he finished fourth again, but was beaten less than a length by the winner Asymmetric. Despite three consecutive defeats the colt was promoted in class again when he was sent to Ireland to contest the Group 1 Phoenix Stakes at the Curragh on 8 August when he was ridden by Shane Foley and started at odds of 12/1. The Railway Stakes winner Go Bears Go started favourite while the other Group race winner in the eight-runner field was Castle Star (Marble Hill Stakes). In a change of tactics Ebro River took the lead soon after the start and set the pace from The Entertainer. He was headed by Dr Zempf and Go Bears Go approaching the final furlong but rallied to regain the advantage and won by three quarters of a length and a head from the aforementioned colts. After the race Foley said "We just said beforehand we wouldn't mind changing the tactics a bit. We'd been dropping him in but there didn't look to be much pace today and with that tailwind it can be hard to get them back up front. He'd been doing things wrong. He'd been keen and quite awkward. Hugo had in his head he wanted to go forward today and it was an ideal day to do it. He had the draw for it. I had a willing partner and he kept pulling out more."

On 12 September Ebro River returned to Ireland for the Group 1 National Stakes over seven furlongs at the Curragh and started the 13/2 third choice in the betting. He took the lead from the start and maintained his advantage until he was overtaken inside the final furlong and finished third behind Native Trail and Point Lonsdale. On his final run of the year he was sent to France to contest the Group 1 Prix Jean-Luc Lagardère over 1400 metres on heavy ground at Longchamp Racecourse on 3 October. He was among the leaders for most of the way but faded badly in the closing stages and came home eighth of the nine runners behind Angel Bleu.

== Pedigree ==
Pedigree of Ebro River (IRE), chestnut colt, 2019
Sire Galileo Gold (GB) 2013	Paco Boy (IRE); 2005	Desert Style	Green Desert (USA)
Sire Galileo Gold (GB) 2013	Paco Boy (IRE); 2005	Desert Style	Organza (GB)
Sire Galileo Gold (GB) 2013	Paco Boy (IRE); 2005	Tarpen Zee	Sandhurst Prince
Sire Galileo Gold (GB) 2013	Paco Boy (IRE); 2005	Tarpen Zee	Rossaldene (GB)
Sire Galileo Gold (GB) 2013	Galicuix (GB); 2008	Galileo (IRE)	Sadler's Wells (USA)
Sire Galileo Gold (GB) 2013	Galicuix (GB); 2008	Galileo (IRE)	Urban Sea (USA)
Sire Galileo Gold (GB) 2013	Galicuix (GB); 2008	Clizia (IRE)	Machiavellian (USA)
Sire Galileo Gold (GB) 2013	Galicuix (GB); 2008	Clizia (IRE)	Cuixmala (FR)
Dam Soft Power (IRE) 2011	Balmont (USA); 2001	Stravinsky	Nureyev
Dam Soft Power (IRE) 2011	Balmont (USA); 2001	Stravinsky	Fire The Groom
Dam Soft Power (IRE) 2011	Balmont (USA); 2001	Aldebaran Light	Seattle Slew
Dam Soft Power (IRE) 2011	Balmont (USA); 2001	Aldebaran Light	Altair
Dam Soft Power (IRE) 2011	Rumuz (IRE); 1994	Marju	Last Tycoon
Dam Soft Power (IRE) 2011	Rumuz (IRE); 1994	Marju	Flame of Tara
Dam Soft Power (IRE) 2011	Rumuz (IRE); 1994	Balqis (USA)	Advocator
Dam Soft Power (IRE) 2011	Rumuz (IRE); 1994	Balqis (USA)	Bold But Baffled (Family: 11-f)
