= Spring Trophy =

Flat horse race in Britain

Spring Trophy Stakes
2026
Lake Forest	Myal	Balmacara

Previous years
2025
Alyanaabi	Tiber Flow	Annaf
2024
Shartash	Pogo	Witch Hunter
2023
Angel Bleu	Holguin	Al Mubhir
2022
Aldaary	Bounce The Blues	Misty Grey
2021
Qaysar	Tomfre	Raaeq

2020-2011
2020
Space Blues	Safe Voyage	Happy Power
2019
Safe Voyage	Mankib	Happy Power
2018
Tabarrak	Mubtasim	Arcanada
2017
Oh This Is Us	Absolutely So	So Beloved
2016
So Beloved	You're Fired	Markaz
2015
That Is The Spirit	Dusky Queen	Penitent
2014
Breton Rock	Custom Cut	Lockwood
2013
Eton Forever	Gregorian	Red Jazz
2012
Red Jazz	Firebeam	Majestic Myles
2011
Beacon Lodge	Kakatosi	Redford

2010-2001
2010
Lovelace	Mia's Boy	Marching
2009
Beacon Lodge	Ordnance Row	City Style
2008
Appalachian Trail	Diamond Tycoon	Aeroplane
2007
Munaddam	Excusez Moi	Mac Love
2006
Majors Cast	Philharmonic	My Paris
2005
Welsh Emperor	Quito	Meshaheer
2004
Rockets 'n Rollers	Polar Ben	Babodana
2003
Patsy's Double	Polar Ben	Welsh Emperor
2002
Reel Buddy	Patsy's Double	Late Night Out
2001
Late Night Out	Winning Venture	May Ball

2000-1992
2000
Arctic Char	Selking	Now Look Here
1999
Late Night Out	Ramooz	Emily's Luck Charm
1998
Beauchamp King	Ramooz	Jorrocks
1997
Craigievar	Ramooz	Musick House
1996
Cool Edge	General Monash	Band On The Run
1995
Moccasin Run	Storiths	Cim Bom Bom
1994
Chaddleworth	Mellottie	Selhurstpark Flyer
1993
Little Bean	Beware Of Agents	Pater Noster
1992
Night Manoeuvres	Night Jar	Ajaad

The Spring Trophy is a Listed flat horse race in Great Britain open to horses aged three years or older. It is run at Haydock Park over a distance of 6 furlongs and 212 yards (1,401 metres), and it is scheduled to take place each year in May.

== Winners ==
Year	Winner	Age	Jockey	Trainer	Time
1979	Formidable	4	Pat Eddery	Peter Walwyn	1:36.11
1980	Kris	4	Joe Mercer	Henry Cecil	1:27.58
1981	Dalsaan	4	Walter Swinburn	Michael Stoute	1:32.39
1982	Mummys Game	3	Taffy Thomas	Bill O'Gorman	1:32.04
1983	Abandoned due to waterlogging
1984	Condrillac	3	Paul Eddery	Henry Cecil	1:28.12
1985	Grey Desire	5	Benji Coogan	Mel Brittain	1:35.25
1986	Bollin Knight	4	Mark Birch	Peter Easterby	1:35.10
1987	Abandoned due to dangerous ground
1988	Prince Rupert	4	Michael Hills	Barry Hills	1:27.23
1989	Beau Sher	6	Peter Bloomfield	Ben Hanbury	1:37.67
1990	Safawan	4	Paul Eddery	Michael Stoute	1:28.39
1991	Corcina	3	John Carroll	Michael Bell	2:14.73
1992	Night Manoeuvres	3	Chris Rutter	Henry Candy	1:33.60
1993	Little Bean	4	Paul Eddery	Geoff Wragg	1:31.88
1994	Chaddleworth	4	Brent Thomson	Peter Chapple-Hyam	1:32.01
1995	Moccasin Run	4	Michael Hills	Ian Balding	1:32.23
1996	Cool Edge	5	Philip Robinson	Mark Tompkins	1:31.46
1997	Craigievar	3	Neil Varley	James Fanshawe	1:36.13
1998	Beauchamp King	5	Chris Rutter	Gerard Butler	1:32.76
1999	Late Night Out	4	Michael Tebbutt	William Jarvis	1:28.90
2000	Arctic Char	4	David McCabe	Brian Meehan	1:29.79
2001	Late Night Out	6	Michael Tebbutt	William Jarvis	1:33.90
2002	Reel Buddy	4	Lee Newman	Richard Hannon Sr.	1:31.32
2003	Patsy's Double	5	Franny Norton	Martin Blanshard	1:32.95
2004	Rockets 'n Rollers	4	Dane O'Neill	Richard Hannon Sr.	1:29.70
2005	Welsh Emperor	6	Robert Winston	Thomas Tate	1:34.37
2006	Majors Cast	5	Shane Kelly	Jeremy Noseda	1:30.33
2007	Munaddam	5	Royston Ffrench	Ed Dunlop	1:31.30
2008	Appalachian Trail	7	Fergal Lynch	Linda Perratt	1:28.23
2009	Beacon Lodge	4	George Baker	Clive Cox	1:30.55
2010	Lovelace	6	Adrian Nicholls	David Nicholls	1:29.35
2011	Beacon Lodge	6	Philip Robinson	Clive Cox	1:26.96
2012	Red Jazz	5	Michael Hills	Charles Hills	1:29.96
2013	Eton Forever	6	Neil Callan	Roger Varian	1:32.01
2014	Breton Rock	4	Fergus Sweeney	David Simcock	1:32.72
2015	That Is The Spirit	4	Graham Gibbons	David O'Meara	1:34.62
2016	So Beloved	6	Danny Tudhope	David O'Meara	1:26.46
2017	Oh This Is Us	4	Tom Marquand	Richard Hannon Jr.	1:28.12
2018	Tabarrak	5	Jim Crowley	Richard Hannon Jr.	1:28.75
2019	Safe Voyage	6	Jason Hart	John Quinn	1:27.76
2020 (Note: The 2020 race was run in June, due to the COVID-19 pandemic in the United Kingdom)	Space Blues	4	James Doyle	Charlie Appleby	1:27.13
2021	Qaysar	6	Joe Fanning	Richard Hannon Jr.	1:36.62
2022	Aldaary	4	Jim Crowley	William Haggas	1:30.02
2023	Angel Bleu	4	Hector Crouch	Ralph Beckett	1:28.53
2024	Shartash	4	Joshua Bryan	Archie Watson	1:26.54
2025	Alyanaabi	4	Jim Crowley	Owen Burrows	1:26.81
2026	Lake Forest	5	Cieren Fallon	William Haggas	1:27.58

== See also ==
- Horse racing in Great Britain
- List of British flat horse races
