= Galileo Gold =

British-bred Thoroughbred racehorse

- Racing silks of C J Murfitt and Al Shaqab Racing
- Sire: Paco Boy
- Grandsire: Desert Style
- Dam: Galicuix
- Damsire: Galileo
- Sex: Stallion
- Foaled: 31 January 2013
- Country: United Kingdom
- Colour: Chestnut
- Breeder: Brian O'Rourke
- Owner: Al Shaqab Racing
- Trainer: Hugo Palmer
- Record: 12: 5-3-1
- Earnings: £963,092

Major wins
- Vintage Stakes (2015); 2000 Guineas (2016); St James's Palace Stakes (2016)

Galileo Gold (foaled 31 January 2013) is a British Thoroughbred racehorse. As a two-year-old he won the Vintage Stakes and finished third in the Prix Jean-Luc Lagardère. On his three-year-old debut he won the classic 2000 Guineas and went on to finish second in the Irish 2,000 Guineas before winning the St James's Palace Stakes.

== Background ==
Galileo Gold is a flaxen chestnut horse with a white star and two white socks bred in England by Brian O'Rourke. He is from the second crop of foals sired by the miler Paco Boy whose wins included the Prix de la Forêt, Queen Anne Stakes and Lockinge Stakes. Prior to Galileo Gold, the best of his offspring had been Peacock (Fairway Stakes) and the sprint handicapper Maljaa. Galileo Gold's dam Galicuix was virtually useless as a racehorse, finishing last in both of her races. She is however, a half-sister of the leading sprinter Goldream and a great-granddaughter of the French broodmare Floripedes who was the dam of Montjeu and the grand-dam of Again.

In September 2014 the yearling was auctioned at the Tattersalls Ireland sale and sold for €33,000 to the bloodstock agent Amanda Skiffington. The colt entered the ownership of C J Murfitt and was sent into training with Hugo Palmer at Newmarket, Suffolk.

== Racing career ==
=== 2015: two-year-old season ===
Galileo Gold made his racecourse debut on 30 May 2015 when he started at odds of 6/1 in a six furlong maiden race at York Racecourse. He finished strongly to take second place, two and three quarter lengths behind the winner Age of Empire. Ten days later at Salisbury Racecourse, the colt started odds-on favourite for a similar event and recorded his first success, winning easily from Zeeoneandonly and ten others. Galileo Gold was then moved up in distance for a race over seven furlongs at Haydock Park on 2 July. Ridden as on his two previous races by Martin Harley he started the 13/8 favourite and won by one and a half length from the John Gosden-trained Hayadh.

After his win at Haydock, Galileo Gold was acquired by Sheikh Joaan Al Thani's Al Shaqab racing. He remained at Palmer's stable but Frankie Dettori took over as his regular jockey. On 28 July the colt was stepped up in class for the Group Two Vintage Stakes at Goodwood Racecourse and started the 9/2 third favourite behind Birchwood (winner of the Superlative Stakes) and the Godolphin colt Strong Challenge. The colt was settled by Dettori towards the rear of the field before switching to the right and accelerating in the last quarter mile. He took the lead a furlong out and got the best of a closely contested finish to win by three quarters of a length from Ibn Malik who took second ahead of Palawan and Twin Sails in a three-way photo finish. After the race Dettori said "It was an eventful race and I got the splits at the right time, but he dug deep and he won well. He showed a good attitude and I was very impressed". Hugo Palmer was unavailable for comment as he was on honeymoon in Turkey. Bookmakers responded by quoting the colt at odds of 33/1 for the following year's 2000 Guineas.

On his final appearance of the season, Galileo Gold was sent to France to contest the Group One Prix Jean-Luc Lagardère over 1600 metres at Longchamp Racecourse on 4 October. Starting at odds of 7/1 in an eleven-runner field he stayed on strongly in the straight to finish third, beaten a short neck and a length by Ultra and Cymric. Commenting on the colt's defeat, Al Shaqab's racing manager Harry Herbert said that the distance might have been too short for Galileo Gold and that he may have been unsuited by the firm ground.

=== 2016: three-year-old season ===
==== Spring ====
On his three-year-old debut, Galileo Gold was one of thirteen colts to contest the 208th running of the 2000 Guineas over the Rowley Mile course at Newmarket Racecourse on 30 April. The odds-on favourite for the race was Air Force Blue who had won the Phoenix Stakes, National Stakes and Dewhurst Stakes in 2015 whilst Galileo Gold started at odds of 14/1. The other contenders were Stormy Antarctic (Craven Stakes), Marcel, Massaat (runner-up in the Dewhurst), Buratino (Coventry Stakes) and Ribchester. The starting stalls were positioned on the stands-side (the left side from the jockeys' viewpoint) and Galileo Gold's #1 draw meant that he started in the centre of the wide, straight course. He broke quickly and disputed the early lead before settling just behind the leaders as the outsider First Selection set the pace. Massaat took the lead a quarter of a mile out but Galileo Gold overtook him approaching the final furlong at which point Dettori began to track left towards the stands-side rail. Galilieo Gold stayed on well in the closing stages to win by one and a half lengths from Massaat, with Dettori indulging in a victory salute to the crowd in the final strides. After the race Hugo Palmer said "I’ve never believed in a horse quite like I believe in this one, but it's not just about my belief in the horse, but the horse's belief in himself. I’ve heard Aidan O'Brien talk about arrogant horses before, like Muhammad Ali saying ‘I am the greatest,’ a good horse believes that. This horse has had such faith in himself now for three weeks, and the world has seen why today".

On the day after the Guineas, Palmer discussed the colt's targets and said that his next race would probably be either the Irish 2000 Guineas or The Derby. Following what was described as a "genetic test" it was decided that the colt would not be aimed at the Derby as he would be unlikely to stay the mile and a half distance. Three weeks after his win at Newmarket Galileo Gold started the 5/4 favourite for the Irish 2000 Guineas at the Curragh with Air Force Blue second in the betting on 4/1. After tracking the leaders he moved up on the inside entering the straight and took second place approaching the final furlong. He was unable to make further progress and was beaten two and a half lengths by Awtaad.

==== Summer ====
At Royal Ascot in June Galileo Gold was matched against Awtaad and the Poule d'Essai des Poulains winner The Gurkha in the St James's Palace Stakes. After racing in second place he was sent to the front by Dettori in the straight and stayed on well to win by one and a quarter lengths from The Gurkha. Palmer commented "It was a tough challenge, he got the most magnificent ride from the widest draw. It's fair to say he's the best three-year-old colt in Europe... Frankie managed to get him into the most magnificent rhythm and then the horse just galloped and galloped and galloped". Galileo Gold faced The Gurkha and Awtaad again in the Sussex Stakes at Goodwood on 27 July, when he was also matched against older horses for the first time. He led for most of the way but was overtaken inside the final furlong and beaten a neck by The Gurkha, with Ribchester a short head away in third place.

On 18 August Galileo Gold was sent to France for the Group One Prix Jacques Le Marois over 1600 metres at Deauville Racecourse. He started the 11/8 favourite but after disputing the lead for most of the way before fading in the closing stages and finishing eighth of the eleven runners behind Ribchester.

==== Autumn ====
After a break of over two months, Galileo Gold returned for the Queen Elizabeth II Stakes at Ascot on 15 October. Starting at odds of 11/2 in a thirteen-runner field he raced prominently before being bumped and hampered in the last quarter mile and finished fifth behind Minding.

=== 2017: four-year-old season ===
Galileo Gold finished fifth in the Lockinge Stakes in May on his only start as a four-year-old and was retired from racing shortly afterwards.

== Stud career ==
Galileo Gold is standing at Tally-Ho stud at County Westmeath in Ireland. His initial service fee in 2018 was listed as €15,000 which has been reduced to €5,000 as of 2021.

=== Notable progeny ===
c = colt, f = filly, g = gelding

Foaled	Name	Sex	Major Wins
2019	Ebro River	c	Phoenix Stakes

== Pedigree ==
Pedigree of Galileo Gold (GB), chestnut colt 2013
Sire Paco Boy (IRE) 2005	Desert Style (IRE); 1992	Green Desert	Danzig
Sire Paco Boy (IRE) 2005	Desert Style (IRE); 1992	Green Desert	Foreign Courier
Sire Paco Boy (IRE) 2005	Desert Style (IRE); 1992	Organza	High Top
Sire Paco Boy (IRE) 2005	Desert Style (IRE); 1992	Organza	Canton Silk
Sire Paco Boy (IRE) 2005	Tappen Zee (IRE); 1986	Sandhurst Prince	Pampapaul
Sire Paco Boy (IRE) 2005	Tappen Zee (IRE); 1986	Sandhurst Prince	Blue Shark
Sire Paco Boy (IRE) 2005	Tappen Zee (IRE); 1986	Rossaldene	Mummy's Pet
Sire Paco Boy (IRE) 2005	Tappen Zee (IRE); 1986	Rossaldene	Palestra
Dam Galicuix (GB) 2008	Galileo (IRE); 1998	Sadler's Wells	Northern Dancer
Dam Galicuix (GB) 2008	Galileo (IRE); 1998	Sadler's Wells	Fairy Bridge
Dam Galicuix (GB) 2008	Galileo (IRE); 1998	Urban Sea	Miswaki
Dam Galicuix (GB) 2008	Galileo (IRE); 1998	Urban Sea	Allegretta
Dam Galicuix (GB) 2008	Clizia (IRE); 2002	Machiavellian	Mr. Prospector
Dam Galicuix (GB) 2008	Clizia (IRE); 2002	Machiavellian	Coup de Folie
Dam Galicuix (GB) 2008	Clizia (IRE); 2002	Cuixmala	Highest Honor
Dam Galicuix (GB) 2008	Clizia (IRE); 2002	Cuixmala	Floripedes (Family: 1-u)
