= Angel Bleu =

French-bred Thoroughbred racehorse

- Racing silks of Marc Chan
- Sire: Dark Angel
- Grandsire: Acclamation
- Dam: Cercle de La Vie
- Damsire: Galileo
- Sex: Colt
- Foaled: 16 February 2019 (age 3)
- Country: France
- Colour: Grey
- Breeder: Pan Sutong Racing Bloodstock
- Owner: Marc Chan
- Trainer: Ralph Beckett
- Record: 14: 6-2-1
- Earnings: £516,298

Major wins
- Vintage Stakes (2021); Prix Jean-Luc Lagardère (2021); Critérium International (2021); Spring Trophy (2023)

Angel Bleu (foaled 16 February 2019) is a French-bred, British-trained Thoroughbred racehorse. He was one of the leading European two-year-olds of 2021 when he won five of his eight races including the Vintage Stakes, Prix Jean-Luc Lagardère and Critérium International.

== Background ==
Angel Bleu is a grey (officially bay) colt bred in France by Pan Sutong Racing Bloodstock. As a yearling in September 2020 he was consigned to the Arqana Deauville Select Sale and was bought for €120,000 by the bloodstock agent Jamie McCalmont. He entered the ownership of Marc Chan, and was sent into training with Ralph Beckett at Kimpton in Hampshire.

He was from the eleventh crop of foals sired by Dark Angel, who won four races including the Mill Reef Stakes and the Middle Park Stakes as a two-year-old in 2007 before being retired to stud at the end of the year. Dark Angel's other offspring have included Lethal Force, Mecca's Angel, Battaash and Harry Angel. Angel Bleu's dam Cercle de La Vie showed little racing ability, failing to win in three starts, but was a full sister to Highland Reel, Idaho and Cape of Good Hope (Caulfield Stakes). Cercle de La Vie's dam Hveger was an Australian mare who finished third in the Australasian Oaks in 2005. As a daughter of the AJC Oaks winner Circles of Gold she was a full-sister to Elvstroem and a close relative of Starspangledbanner.

== Racing career ==
=== 2021: two-year-old season ===
Angel Bleu made his debut in a novice race (for horses with no more than two previous wins) over five furlongs at Leicester Racecourse on 9 April when he started at odds of 11/4 and finished third behind Gubbass, beaten five lengths by the winner. Sixteen days later the colt was ridden by Hector Crouch when he started favourite for a novice race over the same distance at Salisbury Racecourse and recorded his first success as he took the lead approaching the final furlong and won by one and three quarter lengths from Raging. Angel Bleu followed up in a minor race over six furlongs on soft ground at Pontefract Racecourse on 28 May winning from Khunan and Lusail after taking the lead in the closing stages.

For his next start Angel Bleu was stepped up to Group 2 class for the Coventry Stakes at Royal Ascot on 15 June but made little impression as he started a 28/1 outsider and came home thirteenth of the seventeen runners behind Berkshire Shadow after tiring in the closing stages. Frankie Dettori took the ride when the colt was moved up in distance for the Listed Pat Eddery Stakes over seven furlongs at Ascot on 24 July and produced a much better effort as he took the lead a furlong out before being overtaken in the final strides by the favourite New Science. Three days, with Dettori again in the saddle, later Angel Bleu returned to Group 2 class for the Vintage Stakes on soft ground at Goodwood Racecourse and started 100/30 second favourite behind Berkshire Shadow in a six-runner field which also included Eldrickjones (second in the Coventry Stakes) and The Acropolis (from the Aidan O'Brien stable). After tracking the leaders he made a forward move approaching the final furlong but hung to the right and hampered The Acropolis as he did so. He gained the advantage soon afterwards and stayed on well to win by three quarters of a length from Berkshire Shadow. After the race Beckett said that Dettori had felt that Angel Bleu needed a rest after his win at Ascot while owner Marc Chan had suggested gelding the colt and sending him to race in Hong Kong. He went on to explain "I fed him on Sunday and I looked at him sideways and thought ‘you don’t look like you’ve had a hard race to me at all. I jogged him up and he bounced up the yard... With the rain last night I could hardly believe my luck. He like a bit of juice and he likes soft ground".

On 2 October Angel Bleu was sent to France and started at odds of 5.5/1 in a nine-runner field for the Group 1 Prix Jean-Luc Lagardère over 1400 metres on heavy ground at Longchamp Racecourse. The Prix des Chênes winner Ancient Rome started favourite while the other contenders included Ebro River, Accakaba (Prix du Calvados), Noble Truth (Flying Scotsman Stakes) and Rocchigiani (Zukunfts-Rennen). Dettori settled the colt in mid-division before making steady progress and moving into second place behind Noble Truth 400 metres from the finish. He maintained his run, overhauled the leader 100 metres out and won by three quarters of a length with a further three quarters of a length back to Ancient Rome in third place. Ralph Beckett commented "We came here for the soft ground and I think the bend helped. He had to be tough to go and get the other one, and he is that."

Twenty days after his win at Longchamp, Angel Bleu returned to Frane to contest the Group 1 Critérium International over 1600 metres at Saint-Cloud Racecourse. With Dettori in the saddle he started the 1.7/1 second favourite behind Ancient Rome in a six-runner field which also included Purplepay (Criterium Arqana) and Oscula (Prix Six Perfections). After racing at the rear of the field in the early stages, he overtook the front-running outsider Toimy Son 200 metres from the finish and repelled a late challenge from Ancient Rome to win by a head. After the race Beckett said "He's extraordinary. You don’t get horses like him very often, we haven’t had one. The softest part of him is his tooth enamel... the form book tells you that soft ground is very important to him. Any horse that can do that has to have a fantastic constitution."

== Pedigree ==
Pedigree of Angel Bleu (FR), grey colt, 2019
Sire Dark Angel (IRE) 2005	Acclamation (GB); 1999	Royal Applause	Waajib (IRE)
Sire Dark Angel (IRE) 2005	Acclamation (GB); 1999	Royal Applause	Flying Melody (IRE)
Sire Dark Angel (IRE) 2005	Acclamation (GB); 1999	Princess Athena (IRE)	Ahonoora (GB)
Sire Dark Angel (IRE) 2005	Acclamation (GB); 1999	Princess Athena (IRE)	Shopping Wise
Sire Dark Angel (IRE) 2005	Midnight Angel (GB); 1994	Machiavellian (USA)	Mr. Prospector
Sire Dark Angel (IRE) 2005	Midnight Angel (GB); 1994	Machiavellian (USA)	Coup de Folie
Sire Dark Angel (IRE) 2005	Midnight Angel (GB); 1994	Night at Sea	Night Shift (USA)
Sire Dark Angel (IRE) 2005	Midnight Angel (GB); 1994	Night at Sea	Into Harbour
Dam Cercle de La Vie (IRE) 2014	Galileo (IRE); 1998	Sadler's Wells (USA)	Northern Dancer (CAN)
Dam Cercle de La Vie (IRE) 2014	Galileo (IRE); 1998	Sadler's Wells (USA)	Fairy Bridge
Dam Cercle de La Vie (IRE) 2014	Galileo (IRE); 1998	Urban Sea (USA)	Miswaki
Dam Cercle de La Vie (IRE) 2014	Galileo (IRE); 1998	Urban Sea (USA)	Allegretta (GB)
Dam Cercle de La Vie (IRE) 2014	Hveger (AUS); 2001	Danehill (USA)	Danzig
Dam Cercle de La Vie (IRE) 2014	Hveger (AUS); 2001	Danehill (USA)	Razyana
Dam Cercle de La Vie (IRE) 2014	Hveger (AUS); 2001	Circles of Gold	Marscay
Dam Cercle de La Vie (IRE) 2014	Hveger (AUS); 2001	Circles of Gold	Olympic Aim (NZ) (Family: 22-b)
