= Aljabr =

American Thoroughbred racehorse

- Sire: Storm Cat
- Grandsire: Storm Bird
- Dam: Sierra Madre
- Damsire: Baillamont
- Sex: Stallion
- Foaled: 3 February 1996
- Died: 6 February 2018 (aged 22)
- Country: United States
- Colour: Grey
- Breeder: Shadwell Farm Inc
- Owner: Godolphin
- Trainer: Saeed bin Suroor
- Record: 9: 5-1-0
- Earnings: £374,201

Major wins
- Vintage Stakes (1998); Prix de la Salamandre (1998); Sussex Stakes (1999); Lockinge Stakes (2000)

Awards
- Cartier Champion Two-year-old Colt (1998)

Aljabr (3 February 1996 – 6 February 2018) was an American-bred Thoroughbred racehorse and sire who was trained in England and Dubai during a racing career which lasted from 1998 to 2000. He was named European Champion Two-Year-Old Colt for 1998, a year in which he was unbeaten in three starts including the Group One Prix de la Salamandre and the Group Three Vintage Stakes. Training problems restricted Aljabr to only six races in the next two seasons, but he won the Sussex Stakes as a three-year-old and the Lockinge Stakes at four.

== Background ==
Aljabr, a "tall, lengthy" grey horse, was bred in Lexington, Kentucky by the Shadwell Stud, the breeding operation of Hamdan Al Maktoum. Aljabr's sire the double American Champion Storm Cat was a highly successful stallion, producing the winners of more than 60 Conditions races/Grade I including Cat Thief and Tabasco Cat in the United States and Giant's Causeway in Europe. Aljabr's dam Sierra Madre, from whom he inherited his grey coat, was a top-class racemare, winning the Prix Marcel Boussac and the Prix Vermeille.

Aljabr was trained throughout his career by Saeed bin Suroor, spending his summers in England and his winters in Dubai as part of the Godolphin Racing team. He was ridden in seven of his nine races by the Godolphin stable jockey Frankie Dettori.

Al-Jabr (الجبر) is an Arabic word meaning "restoration" and is the origin of the term algebra.

== Racing career ==
=== 1998: two-year-old season ===
Won all three starts. Aljabr first appeared in a maiden race at Sandown in early July. Starting the Evens favourite he led from the start and drew clear in the closing stages to win "comfortably" by four lengths. The beaten horses included the future Group race winners Lots of Magic (Jersey Stakes), Pulau Tioman (Diomed Stakes) and Hula Angel (Irish 1,000 Guineas). At the end of the month Aljabr was moved up to Group Three class for the Vintage Stakes at Glorious Goodwood, for which he was made odds-on favourite. The race was a repeat of his Sandown win, with Aljabr taking an early lead and pulling away in the final furlong to win by three lengths. The form of the race was boosted in August when the runner-up Raise A Grand, won the Solario Stakes at Sandown.

On his next start, Aljabr was moved up to the highest level as he was sent to France for the Group One Prix de la Salamandre at Longchamp. He started 6/4 favourite and Dettori sent the colt into the lead from the start. In the straight he held off a strong challenge from the future European Champion Sprinter Stravinsky to win by half a length in what one correspondent described as a "pulsating showdown". Stravinsky was subsequently disqualified for causing interference. After the race Simon Crisford, Godolphin's racing manager, explained that the colt would be unlikely to run again that year as they did not want to over-race him. The bookmakers offered him at 7/1 for the following year's 2000 Guineas.

=== 1999: three-year-old season ===
By January 1999 Aljabr had shortened to 4/1 favourite for the Guineas, but after performing particularly well on the sand track in Dubai the decision was taken to send him to the United States for the Kentucky Derby. He arrived safely at Churchill Downs but was withdrawn two days before the race after bruising a hoof and sustaining a muscle injury in training. Aljabr did not reappear until June, when he was sent to Royal Ascot for the St James's Palace Stakes. Aljabr raced prominently and led the field into the straight. In the final furlong he was caught and passed by the French-trained Sendawar but stayed on to hold second place. In July Aljabr was made favourite for the Sussex Stakes at Goodwood. As usual, he was sent to the front from the start and when pressed in the straight by Docksider he quickened again as "only a brilliant horse can" to pull ahead and win by a length. His winning time of 1:35.66 was a course record. Dettori expressed the view that Aljabr had been "a race short" (below peak fitness) at Ascot and looked forward to taking on Sendawar again.

The rematch with Sendawar came in the Prix du Moulin at Longchamp in September. Aljabr challenged for the lead in the straight, but weakened in the closing stages to finish a well-beaten fourth. It was subsequently revealed that Aljabr had fractured a bone in his knee, and the colt was off the course for the next eight months.

=== 2000: four-year-old season ===
Aljabr made a successful start to his four-year-old season by winning the Group One Lockinge Stakes at Newbury. Predictably, he led from the start and was driven out to win by two lengths from Trans Island. This was to be his last association with Dettori who was forced out of action for several weeks after being injured in a plane crash; in his two remaining races Aljabr was ridden by Richard Hills.

At Royal Ascot Aljabr started favourite for the Queen Anne Stakes, but could finish only fourth behind Kalanisi. On his final start he failed to repeat his 1999 performance in the Sussex Stakes, finishing fifth of the nine runners behind Giant's Causeway. His retirement was announced in August.

== Assessment ==
Aljabr was named European Champion Two-Year-Old Colt at the 1998 Cartier Racing Awards. In the official International Classification however, he was ranked third, four pounds behind the Dewhurst Stakes winner Mujahid.

Aljabr was given a peak Timeform rating of 125.

== Stud career ==
Aljabr returned to his birthplace at the Shadwell Stud in Kentucky, to stand as a stallion from 2001 to 2008. Since 2009 he has been based at the Ascot Stud near Port Colborne, Ontario. where he stands at a fee of $3,500.

Aljabr has made little impact as a sire. His progeny have won more than seventy races, but none at Group level, with the best of his offspring being the successful handicapper Munaddam.

Aljabr died on February 6, 2018, of a heart attack at Shadwell.

== Pedigree ==
Pedigree of Aljabr (USA), grey stallion, 1996
Sire Storm Cat (USA) 1983	Storm Bird; 1978	Northern Dancer	Nearctic
Sire Storm Cat (USA) 1983	Storm Bird; 1978	Northern Dancer	Natalma
Sire Storm Cat (USA) 1983	Storm Bird; 1978	South Ocean	New Providence
Sire Storm Cat (USA) 1983	Storm Bird; 1978	South Ocean	Shining Sun
Sire Storm Cat (USA) 1983	Terlingua; 1976	Secretariat	Bold Ruler
Sire Storm Cat (USA) 1983	Terlingua; 1976	Secretariat	Somethingroyal
Sire Storm Cat (USA) 1983	Terlingua; 1976	Crimson Saint	Crimson Satan
Sire Storm Cat (USA) 1983	Terlingua; 1976	Crimson Saint	Bolero Rose
Dam Sierra Madre (FR) 1991	Baillamont; 1982	Blushing Groom	Red God
Dam Sierra Madre (FR) 1991	Baillamont; 1982	Blushing Groom	Runaway Bride
Dam Sierra Madre (FR) 1991	Baillamont; 1982	Lodeve	Shoemaker
Dam Sierra Madre (FR) 1991	Baillamont; 1982	Lodeve	Locust Time
Dam Sierra Madre (FR) 1991	Marie d'Irlande; 1979	Kalamoun	Zeddaan
Dam Sierra Madre (FR) 1991	Marie d'Irlande; 1979	Kalamoun	Khairunessa
Dam Sierra Madre (FR) 1991	Marie d'Irlande; 1979	La Ferte Milon	Timmy Lad
Dam Sierra Madre (FR) 1991	Marie d'Irlande; 1979	La Ferte Milon	Salamine (Family: 3-d)
