= High Chaparral =

Irish Thoroughbred racehorse (1999–2014)

- Racing colours of Michael Tabor
- Sire: Sadler's Wells
- Grandsire: Northern Dancer
- Dam: Kasora
- Damsire: Darshaan
- Sex: Stallion
- Foaled: 1 March 1999
- Died: 21 December 2014 (aged 15)
- Country: Ireland
- Colour: Bay
- Breeder: Sean & Anne Coughlan
- Owner: Michael Tabor & Sue Magnier
- Trainer: Aidan O'Brien
- Record: 13: 10-1-2
- Earnings: $5,391,888

Major wins
- Racing Post Trophy (2001); Ballysax Stakes (2002); Derrinstown Stud Derby Trial (2002); Epsom Derby (2002); Irish Derby Stakes (2002); Breeders' Cup Turf (2002, 2003); Royal Whip Stakes (2003); Irish Champion Stakes (2003)

Awards
- U.S. Champion Male Turf Horse (2002, 2003); Timeform rating: 132
- Last updated on 23 October 2022

High Chaparral (1 March 1999 – 21 December 2014) was an Irish Thoroughbred racehorse and sire. In a career that lasted from September 2001 to October 2003, he ran 13 times and won 10 races. His win in the Racing Post Trophy made him one of the highest-rated two-year-olds of 2001. In 2002, he defeated Hawk Wing in the Derby and won the Breeders' Cup Turf. At four, he defeated Falbrav and Alamshar in the Irish Champion Stakes and won a second Breeders' Cup Turf.

== Background ==
High Chaparral was a dark-coated bay horse with a white star. He stood just over 16 hands high and was bred in County Tipperary, Ireland, by Sean Coughlan. In September 2000, he was consigned by the Mountain View Stud to the Tattersalls sales, where he was bought for 270,000 guineas by Dermot "Demi" O'Byrne on behalf of Michael Tabor's Coolmore organisation. He was sent into training with Aidan O'Brien at Ballydoyle.

== Racing career ==
=== 2001: Two-year-old season ===
High Chaparral failed to make a winning debut, beaten by a short-head by Hot Trotter in a maiden at Punchestown on 30 September. A week later, he recorded his first victory when winning a maiden race at Tipperary by two and a half lengths. On his next start, High Chaparral was sent to England to run in the Group 1 Racing Post Trophy at Doncaster. He was considered the Ballydoyle second string, behind the odds-on favourite Castle Gandolfo. Ridden by the British veteran Kevin Darley, High Chaparral was held up in the early stages before producing a sustained run in the closing stages to beat his stable companion by three-quarters of a length.

=== 2002: Three-year-old season ===
On his three-year-old debut, High Chaparral recorded a seven-length win in the Ballysax Stakes at Leopardstown on 14 April. A month later, he started at odds of 1/5 in the Derrinstown Stud Derby Trial and won by a length from In Time's Eye.

After winning both trials, High Chaparral was strongly fancied for the 2002 Epsom Derby and was made 7/2 second favourite. The strong favourite was his stable companion Hawk Wing, second in the 2,000 Guineas. Hawk Wing was selected by Mick Kinane, leaving the ride on High Chaparral to Johnny Murtagh. Among the other contenders was Bandari, who had won the Lingfield Derby Trial by over ten lengths. Murtagh held the colt up in the early stages, before moving up to take the lead early in the straight. He was soon challenged by Hawk Wing and from that point on the stablemates had the race between them. High Chaparral was never headed and won by two lengths. The O'Brien pair finished 12 lengths clear of Moon Ballad in third.

Three weeks after his win at Epsom, High Chaparral reappeared in the Irish Derby at the Curragh, for which he started as the 1/3 favourite. Ridden by Mick Kinane, he took the lead in the closing stages and won from his stable companion Sholokhov, who had been his pacemaker.

High Chaparral was then off the racecourse for more than three months before running in the Prix de l'Arc de Triomphe at Longchamp in October. He was ridden by Mick Kinane and started 2.2/1 favourite against 15 opponents. He was always prominent and ran on strongly in the straight, but never reached the front and finished third behind Marienbard and Sulamani, beaten just over a length. Three weeks later, High Chaparral was sent to Arlington Park for the Breeders' Cup Turf. He was held up in the early stages before producing what The Guardian's correspondent described as an "irresistible surge" to take the lead in the final furlong and win by one and a quarter lengths from With Anticipation. After the race, Kinane described him as "all class".

=== 2003: Four-year-old season ===
Contrary to the trend of retiring three-year-old champions, High Chaparral was kept in training at four, although he did not race until August. He then won the Royal Whip Stakes at the Curragh, beating Imperial Dancer by three-quarters of a length. Four weeks later, he won a rough race for the Irish Champion Stakes at Leopardstown, beating Falbrav by a neck with Islington third and the King George winner Alamshar fourth.

In October, High Chaparral again started favourite for the Arc, this time going off at odds of 13/8 in a field of 13. He finished third, beaten more than five lengths by Dalakhani. On his final start, he returned to the United States to attempt to become the first horse to win two runnings of the Breeders' Cup Turf. High Chaparral raced in fourth place before making his challenge in the straight. He appeared to have narrowly got the better of a sustained battle with Falbrav, but was then caught in the last stride by Johar. The result of the three-way photo-finish was a dead heat for first place between High Chaparral and Johar, with Falbrav a head back in third.

== Assessment and honours ==
High Chaparral was voted the Eclipse Award for Outstanding Male Turf Horse in both 2002 and 2003. In 2001, he was rated the seventh-best two-year-old in Europe, nine pounds below the champion Johannesburg. A year later, he was rated the second-best racehorse in the world, two pounds behind Rock of Gibraltar. In 2003, High Chaparral was rated the equal-fourth-best horse in the world by the International Federation of Horse Racing Authorities.

== Stud record ==
During the 2005 Northern Hemisphere winter, High Chaparral was a shuttle stallion at Windsor Park Stud in New Zealand. In 2006, he stood at Coolmore Stud, Fethard, County Tipperary, for a service fee of €25,000.

His first New Zealand crop includes 2009 and 2010 Cox Plate winner So You Think, 2009 Victoria Derby and Spring Champion Stakes winner Monaco Consul, 2010 Randwick Guineas, the Australian Derby winner Shoot Out, and 2010 Caulfield Cup winner Descarado.

During the 2010 Australian stud season, High Chaparral stood for A$88,000 at Coolmore Stud near Jerrys Plains, New South Wales, in Australia after Coolmore retained Montjeu in Ireland.

High Chaparral died on 21 December 2014, with Coolmore announcing: "High Chaparral has been euthanised at Fethard Equine Hospital during exploratory colic surgery due to a perforated intestine".

=== Notable progeny ===
c = colt, f = filly, g = gelding

Foaled	Name	Sex	Major Wins
2006	Descarado	g	Caulfield Cup, Caulfield Stakes
2006	Monaco Consul	c	Victoria Derby, Spring Champion Stakes
2006	Redwood	c	Northern Dancer Turf Stakes
2006	Shoot Out	g	Chipping Norton Stakes x2, Australian Derby, George Main Stakes, Randwick Guineas
2006	So You Think	c	Cox Plate x2, Tattersalls Gold Cup x2, Yalumba Stakes, Underwood Stakes, MacKinnon Stakes, Eclipse Stakes, Irish Champion Stakes, Prince of Wales's Stakes
2007	Wigmore Hall	g	Northern Dancer Turf Stakes x2
2008	High Jinx	c	Prix du Cadran
2009	Dundeel	c	Spring Champion Stakes, Australian Derby, Underwood Stakes, ATC Queen Elizabeth Stakes, Rosehill Guineas, Randwick Guineas
2009	Wrote	c	Breeders' Cup Juvenile Turf
2010	Altior	g	Supreme Novices' Hurdle, Henry VIII Novices' Chase, Arkle Challenge Trophy, Queen Mother Champion Chase, Tingle Creek Chase
2010	Contributor	c	Chipping Norton Stakes, Ranvet Stakes
2010	Pondarosa Miss	f	Easter Handicap
2010	Toronado	c	Sussex Stakes, Queen Anne Stakes
2011	Fenway	f	Storm Queen Stakes
2011	Lucky Lion	c	Bayerisches Zuchtrennen
2011	Free Eagle	c	Prince of Wales's Stakes
2012	Tivaci	c	All Aged Stakes
2013	Montoya's Secret	f	Vinery Stud Stakes
2014	Ace High	c	Spring Champion Stakes, Victoria Derby
2014	Rekindling	c	Melbourne Cup
2014	Hiyaam	f	Vinery Stud Stakes
2014	Youngstar	f	Queensland Oaks
2015	Princess Jenni	f	Australasian Oaks

== Pedigree ==
Pedigree of High Chaparral (IRE) (1-n) bay 1999
Sire Sadler's Wells (USA) B. 1981	Northern Dancer (CAN); B. 1961	Nearctic	Nearco
Sire Sadler's Wells (USA) B. 1981	Northern Dancer (CAN); B. 1961	Nearctic	Lady Angela
Sire Sadler's Wells (USA) B. 1981	Northern Dancer (CAN); B. 1961	Natalma	Native Dancer
Sire Sadler's Wells (USA) B. 1981	Northern Dancer (CAN); B. 1961	Natalma	Almahmoud
Sire Sadler's Wells (USA) B. 1981	Fairy Bridge; B. 1975	Bold Reason	Hail to Reason
Sire Sadler's Wells (USA) B. 1981	Fairy Bridge; B. 1975	Bold Reason	Lalun
Sire Sadler's Wells (USA) B. 1981	Fairy Bridge; B. 1975	Special	Forli
Sire Sadler's Wells (USA) B. 1981	Fairy Bridge; B. 1975	Special	Thong
Dam Kasora B. 1993	Darshaan (GB); Brown 1981	Shirley Heights	Mill Reef
Dam Kasora B. 1993	Darshaan (GB); Brown 1981	Shirley Heights	Hardiemma
Dam Kasora B. 1993	Darshaan (GB); Brown 1981	Delsy	Abdos
Dam Kasora B. 1993	Darshaan (GB); Brown 1981	Delsy	Kelty
Dam Kasora B. 1993	Kozana; Brown 1982	Kris	Sharpen Up
Dam Kasora B. 1993	Kozana; Brown 1982	Kris	Doubly Sure
Dam Kasora B. 1993	Kozana; Brown 1982	Koblenza	Hugh Lupus
Dam Kasora B. 1993	Kozana; Brown 1982	Koblenza	Kalimara (family: 1-n)
