= Vintage Stakes =

Flat horse race in Britain

- Class: Group 2
- Location: Goodwood Racecourse; W. Sussex, England
- Inaugurated: 1975
- Race type: Flat / Thoroughbred
- Sponsor: Coral
- Website: Goodwood

Race information
- Distance: 7f (1,408 metres)
- Surface: Turf
- Track: Right-handed
- Qualification: Two-year-olds
- Weight: 9 st 3 lb Allowances; 3 lb for fillies Penalties; 3 lb for G1 / G2 winners
- Purse: £175,000 (2025); 1st: £99,243

Vintage Stakes
2026
Dr Rascal	Haffner	Al Hudaiba

Previous years
2025
Zavateri	Morris Dancer	Do Or Do Not
2024
Aomori City	Wolf Of Badenoch	Cool Hoof Luke
2023
Haatem	Iberian	Mountain Bear
2022
Marbaan	Holloway Boy	Mysterious Night
2021
Angel Bleu	Berkshire Shadow	Austrian Theory

2020-2011
2020
Battleground	Devious Company	Youth Spirit
2019
Pinatubo	Positive	Lope Y Fernandez
2018
Dark Vision	Dunkerron	Confiding
2017
Expert Eye	Zaman	Mildenberger
2016
War Decree	Thunder Snow	Boynton
2015
Galileo Gold	Ibn Malik	Palawan
2014
Highland Reel	Tupi	Room Key
2013
Toormore	Outstrip	Parbold
2012
Olympic Glory	Artigiano	Luhaif
2011
Chandlery	Rockinante	Red Duke

2010-2001
2010
King Torus	Stentorian	Major Art
2009
Xtension	Mata Keranjang	Corporal Maddox
2008
Orizaba	Lord Shanakill	Sayif
2007
Rio De La Plata	Lizard Island	Donegal
2006
Strategic Prince	Duke Of Marmalade	Kirklees
2005
Sir Percy	Cool Creek	Black Charmer
2004
Shamardal	Wilko	Fox
2003
Lucky Story	The Mighty Tiger	Devil Moon
2002
Dublin	Bourbonnais	Sarayat
2001
Naheef	Bragadino	Leo's Luckyman

2000-1991
2000
No Excuse Needed	Bonnard	Shaard
1999
Ekraar	Sarafan	Launfal
1998
Aljabr	Raise A Grand	Gold Academy
1997
Central Park	Docksider	Little Indian
1996
Putra	Grapeshot	Equal Rights
1995
Alhaarth	Allied Forces	More Royal
1994
Eltish	Montjoy	Queenfisher
1993
Mister Baileys	Prince Babar	Lomas
1992
Maroof	Humam	Shebl
1991
Dr Devious	Made Of Gold	Governor's Imp

1990-1988
1990
Mukaddamah	Flying Brave	Generous
1989
Be My Chief	Robellation	Dashing Blade
1988
High Estate	Spitfire	Stone Flake

The Vintage Stakes is a Group 2 flat horse race in Great Britain open to two-year-old horses. It is run at Goodwood over a distance of 7 furlongs (1,408 metres), and it is scheduled to take place each year in late July or early August.

== History ==
The event was established in 1975, and it was originally classed at Listed level. During the early part of its history it was sponsored by Lanson and known as the Lanson Champagne Vintage Stakes. It was given Group 3 status in 1986.

The Vintage Stakes was promoted to Group 2 level in 2003, and from this point it was sponsored by Veuve Clicquot. It is currently held on the opening day of the five-day Glorious Goodwood meeting.

Several winners of the Vintage Stakes have gone on to achieve victory in one of the following year's Classics. The most recent was Galileo Gold, the winner of the 2000 Guineas in 2016.

== Records ==
Leading jockey (6 wins):

- Willie Carson – Troy (1978), Church Parade (1980), Mukaddamah (1990), Dr Devious (1991), Maroof (1992), Alhaarth (1995)
- Frankie Dettori - Aljabr (1998), Naheef (2001), Rio de la Plata (2007), Orizaba (2008), Galileo Gold (2015), Angel Bleu (2021)

Leading trainer (6 wins):

- Dick Hern – Riboboy (1975), Sky Ship (1976), Troy (1978), Church Parade (1980), Petoski (1984), Alhaarth (1995)
- Sir Henry Cecil – Marathon Gold (1979), Trojan Fen (1983), Faustus (1985), High Estate (1988), Be My Chief (1989), Eltish (1994)

== Winners ==
Year	Winner	Jockey	Trainer	Time
1975	Riboboy	Joe Mercer	Dick Hern	1:29.88
1976	Sky Ship	Joe Mercer	Dick Hern	1:31.62
1977	Conte Santi	Brian Taylor	Ryan Price	1:28.91
1978	Troy	Willie Carson	Dick Hern	1:28.96
1979	Marathon Gold	Joe Mercer	Henry Cecil	1:33.17
1980	Church Parade	Willie Carson	Dick Hern	1:30.65
1981	Treboro	Greville Starkey	Guy Harwood	1:30.90
1982	All Systems Go	George Duffield	Gavin Pritchard-Gordon	1:26.92
1983	Trojan Fen	Lester Piggott	Henry Cecil	1:26.77
1984	Petoski	Joe Mercer	Dick Hern	1:29.53
1985	Faustus	Steve Cauthen	Henry Cecil	1:29.86
1986	Don't Forget Me	Pat Eddery	Richard Hannon Sr.	1:29.70
1987	Undercut	Pat Eddery	Guy Harwood	1:28.44
1988	High Estate	Steve Cauthen	Henry Cecil	1:29.47
1989	Be My Chief	Steve Cauthen	Henry Cecil	1:26.61
1990	Mukaddamah	Willie Carson	Peter Walwyn	1:25.99
1991	Dr Devious	Willie Carson	Peter Chapple-Hyam	1:28.71
1992	Maroof	Willie Carson	Robert Armstrong	1:25.97
1993	Mister Baileys	Dean McKeown	Mark Johnston	1:31.42
1994	Eltish	Pat Eddery	Henry Cecil	1:26.62
1995	Alhaarth	Willie Carson	Dick Hern	1:26.21
1996	Putra	Richard Quinn	Paul Cole	1:27.32
1997	Central Park	Pat Eddery	Paul Cole	1:27.26
1998	Aljabr	Frankie Dettori	Saeed bin Suroor	1:29.16
1999	Ekraar	Richard Hills	Marcus Tregoning	1:24.99
2000	No Excuse Needed	Johnny Murtagh	Sir Michael Stoute	1:27.70
2001	Naheef	Frankie Dettori	David Loder	1:26.32
2002	Dublin	Jamie Spencer	David Loder	1:27.58
2003	Lucky Story	Keith Dalgleish	Mark Johnston	1:27.95
2004	Shamardal	Joe Fanning	Mark Johnston	1:27.41
2005	Sir Percy	Martin Dwyer	Marcus Tregoning	1:28.66
2006	Strategic Prince	Eddie Ahern	Paul Cole	1:26.02
2007	Rio de la Plata	Frankie Dettori	Saeed bin Suroor	1:26.05
2008	Orizaba	Frankie Dettori	Mick Channon	1:26.54
2009	Xtension	Adam Kirby	Clive Cox	1:27.46
2010	King Torus	Richard Hughes	Richard Hannon Sr.	1:27.13
2011	Chandlery	Richard Hughes	Richard Hannon Sr.	1:27.00
2012	Olympic Glory	Richard Hughes	Richard Hannon Sr.	1:27.70
2013	Toormore	Richard Hughes	Richard Hannon Sr.	1:27.57
2014	Highland Reel	Joseph O'Brien	Aidan O'Brien	1:26.81
2015	Galileo Gold	Frankie Dettori	Hugo Palmer	1:28.06
2016	War Decree	Ryan Moore	Aidan O'Brien	1:25.75
2017	Expert Eye	Andrea Atzeni	Sir Michael Stoute	1:26.97
2018	Dark Vision	Silvestre de Sousa	Mark Johnston	1:28.23
2019	Pinatubo	James Doyle	Charlie Appleby	1:27.03
2020	Battleground	Ryan Moore	Aidan O'Brien	1:28.80
2021	Angel Bleu	Frankie Dettori	Ralph Beckett	1:32.85
2022	Marbaan	Jamie Spencer	Charlie Fellowes	1:26.46
2023	Haatem	Sean Levey	Richard Hannon Jr.	1:30.15
2024	Aomori City	William Buick	Charlie Appleby	1:25.13
2025	Zavateri	Charles Bishop	Eve Johnson Houghton	1:26.43
2026	Dr Rascal	Kaiya Fraser	Oliver Cole	1:26.53

== See also ==
- Horse racing in Great Britain
- List of British flat horse races
