= Somerville Tattersall Stakes =

Flat horse race in Britain

Somerville Tattersall Stakes (Tattersalls Stakes)
- Class: Group 3
- Location: Rowley Mile; Newmarket, England
- Race type: Flat / Thoroughbred
- Website: Newmarket

Race information
- Distance: 7f (1,408 metres)
- Surface: Turf
- Track: Straight
- Qualification: Two-year-old colts and geldings
- Weight: 9 st 2 lb Penalties; 5 lb for G1 / G2 winners 3 lb for G3 winners
- Purse: £60,000 (2025); 1st: £34,026

Somerville Tattersall Stakes
2026
Fuel The Jet	Notable Dream	Mezzo Forte

Previous years
2025
Distant Storm	Commander's Intent	Archer Royal
2024
The Waco Kid	Diego Ventura	Monumental
2023
Alyanaabi	Boiling Point	Eben Shaddad
2022
Nostrum	Holloway Boy	Victory Dance
2021
Modern Games	Trident	Harrow

2020-2011
2020
La Barrosa	Dark Lion	Qaader
2019
Wichita	Persuasion	Ropey Guest
2018
Arctic Sound	Bye Bye Hong Kong	Prince Eiji
2017
Elarqam	Tip Two Win	Tangled
2016
Larchmont Lad	Whitecliffsofdover	Sir Dancealot
2015
Sanus Per Aquam	Tasleet	Adventurous
2014
Maftool	Markaz	Mubtaghaa
2013
Miracle of Medinah	Cable Bay	Nezar
2012
Havana Gold	Well Acquainted	Glean
2011
Crius	Farraaj	Zip Top

2010-2001
2010
Rerouted	Surrey Star	Royal Exchange
2009
Sir Parky	Sebastian Flyte	Mata Keranjang
2008
Ashram	Control Zone	Derbaas
2007
River Proud	Iguazu Falls	Yankadi
2006
Thousand Words	Dijeerr	Ferneley
2005
Aussie Rules	Killybegs	Stepping Up
2004
Diktatorial	Crimson Sun	Mister Genepi
2003
Milk It Mick	Bayeux	Bachelor Duke
2002
Governor Brown	Muqbil	Hurricane Alan
2001
Where Or When	Della Francesca	Savannah Bay

2000-1991
2000
King Charlemagne	Grandera	Patsy's Double
1999
Best Light	Winning Venture	Meadaaar
1998
Enrique	Berlioz	Eltawaasul
1997
Haami	Bintang	Aix En Provence
1996
Grapeshot	Musical Dancer	Falak
1995
Even Top	Tumbleweed Ridge	Sovereign's Crown
1994
Annus Mirabilis	Muhab	Downclose
1993
Grand Lodge	Colonel Collins	Fast Eddy
1992
Nominator	Urgent Request	Fitzcarraldo
1991
Tertian	Mojave	Wilde Rufo

1990-1988
1990
Peter Davies	Bog Trotter	Democratic
1989
Free At Last	Qui Danzig	Curia Regis
1988
Opening Verse	Bequest	Sweeping

The Somerville Tattersall Stakes, currently run as the Tattersalls Stakes, is a Group 3 flat horse race in Great Britain open to two-year-old colts and geldings. It is run on the Rowley Mile at Newmarket over a distance of 7 furlongs (1,408 metres), and it is scheduled to take place each year in late September.

== History ==
The event is named after Edmund Somerville Tattersall (1863–1942), a senior partner of Tattersalls bloodstock auctioneers.

The race was formerly classed at Listed level, and it used to be open to horses of either gender. It was promoted to Group 3 status in 2000.

The Somerville Tattersall Stakes is currently held on the opening day of Newmarket's three-day Cambridgeshire Meeting. It is run two days before the Cambridgeshire Handicap.

The leading contenders sometimes go on to compete in the Dewhurst Stakes or the Racing Post Trophy.

== Records ==
Leading jockey (6 wins):

- Pat Eddery – Don Comiso (1977), Borderline (1978), Damister (1984), Tertian (1991), Grand Lodge (1993), Milk It Mick (2003)

Leading trainer (5 wins):

- Sir Henry Cecil – Polished Silver (1982), Salse (1987), Opening Verse (1988), Peter Davies (1990), Enrique (1998)

== Winners ==
Year	Winner	Jockey	Trainer	Time
1961	Cyrus	Bill Rickaby	Geoffrey Brooke	1:29.70
1962	Portofino	Harry Carr	Humphrey Cottrill	1:29.16
1963	Roan Rocket	Scobie Breasley	George Todd	1:27.71
1964	Goupi	Scobie Breasley	Staff Ingham	1:30.77
1965	Double-U-Jay	Doug Smith	Guy Harwood	Not taken
1966	Paddykin	Geoff Lewis	Staff Ingham	1:33.24
1967 (dh)	Virginia Gentleman; Battle Flame	Doug Smith; Ron Hutchinson	Geoffrey Brooke; John Dunlop	1:29.23
1968	Zarco	Eddie Hide	Bill Elsey	1:30.54
1969	Smokey Rockett	Lester Piggott	Michael Jarvis	1:31.27
1970	Banco Divin	John Gorton	Bruce Hobbs	1:31.49
1971	Coup de Feu	Jimmy Lindley	Jack Watts	1:30.83
1972	Silver Birch	Graham Sexton	Tom Waugh	1:28.84
1973	Spanish Warrior	Des Cullen	Derrick Candy	1:28.09
1974	Escapologist	Geoff Lewis	Arthur Budgett	1:32.26
1975	Seadiver	Willie Carson	Bernard van Cutsem	1:26.44
1976	Princess Tiara	Tony Kimberley	Jeremy Hindley	1:33.82
1977	Don Comiso	Pat Eddery	Peter Walwyn	1:26.86
1978	Borderline	Pat Eddery	Ian Balding	1:27.02
1979	Stumped	Geoff Baxter	Bruce Hobbs	1:26.90
1980	Spark of Life	Lester Piggott	Michael Stoute	1:30.89
1981	Wind and Wuthering	Philip Waldron	Henry Candy	1:28.89
1982	Polished Silver	Lester Piggott	Henry Cecil	1:29.48
1983	Round Hill	Willie Carson	Dick Hern	1:27.40
1984	Damister	Pat Eddery	Jeremy Tree	1:29.46
1985	Truly Nureyev	Walter Swinburn	Michael Stoute	1:25.93
1986	Imperial Frontier	Greville Starkey	Luca Cumani	1:26.23
1987	Salse	Steve Cauthen	Henry Cecil	1:27.51
1988	Opening Verse	Michael Roberts	Henry Cecil	1:25.66
1989	Free at Last	Tony Clark	Guy Harwood	1:28.60
1990	Peter Davies	Steve Cauthen	Henry Cecil	1:24.66
1991	Tertian	Pat Eddery	André Fabre	1:25.76
1992	Nominator	Willie Carson	Reg Hollinshead	1:26.47
1993	Grand Lodge	Pat Eddery	William Jarvis	1:27.52
1994	Annus Mirabilis	Michael Kinane	Michael Stoute	1:25.15
1995	Even Top	Philip Robinson	Mark Tompkins	1:24.51
1996	Grapeshot	Frankie Dettori	Luca Cumani	1:23.47
1997	Haami	Richard Hills	John Dunlop	1:24.52
1998	Enrique	Kieren Fallon	Henry Cecil	1:26.81
1999	Scarteen Fox (Note: The 1999 winner Scarteen Fox was later exported to Hong Kong and renamed Best Light)	Michael Kinane	David Elsworth	1:28.34
2000	King Charlemagne	Michael Kinane	Aidan O'Brien	1:26.97
2001	Where Or When	Richard Quinn	Terry Mills	1:27.13
2002	Governor Brown	Richard Quinn	Paul Cole	1:25.87
2003	Milk It Mick	Pat Eddery	Jamie Osborne	1:24.90
2004	Diktatorial	Martin Dwyer	Andrew Balding	1:26.00
2005	Aussie Rules	Kieren Fallon	Aidan O'Brien	1:23.44
2006	Thousand Words	Richard Hughes	Barry Hills	1:28.42
2007	River Proud	Richard Quinn	Paul Cole	1:25.71
2008	Ashram	Ryan Moore	John Hills	1:22.39
2009	Sir Parky	Richard Hughes	Richard Hannon Sr.	1:24.59
2010	Rerouted	Michael Hills	Barry Hills	1:26.06
2011	Crius	Richard Hughes	Richard Hannon Sr.	1:22.88
2012	Havana Gold	Richard Hughes	Richard Hannon Sr.	1:23.98
2013	Miracle of Medinah	Liam Keniry	Mark Usher	1:25.92
2014	Maftool	Richard Hughes	Saeed bin Suroor	1:23.34
2015	Sanus Per Aquam	Kevin Manning	Jim Bolger	1:25.06
2016	Larchmont Lad	Sean Levey	Richard Hannon Jr.	1:24.81
2017	Elarqam	Jim Crowley	Mark Johnston	1:25.49
2018	Arctic Sound	Silvestre de Sousa	Mark Johnston	1:23.38
2019	Wichita	Ryan Moore	Aidan O'Brien	1:23.55
2020	La Barrosa	William Buick	Charlie Appleby	1:25.29
2021	Modern Games	William Buick	Charlie Appleby	1:23.62
2022	Nostrum	Ryan Moore	Sir Michael Stoute	1:25.01
2023	Alyanaabi	Jim Crowley	Owen Burrows	1:24.53
2024	The Waco Kid	Oisin Murphy	Hugo Palmer	1:29.97
2025	Distant Storm	William Buick	Charlie Appleby	1:24.15
2026	Fuel The Jet	Neil Callan	Tom Clover	1:24.24

== See also ==
- Horse racing in Great Britain
- List of British flat horse races
